= Pro Roscio Amerino =

Speech of Cicero

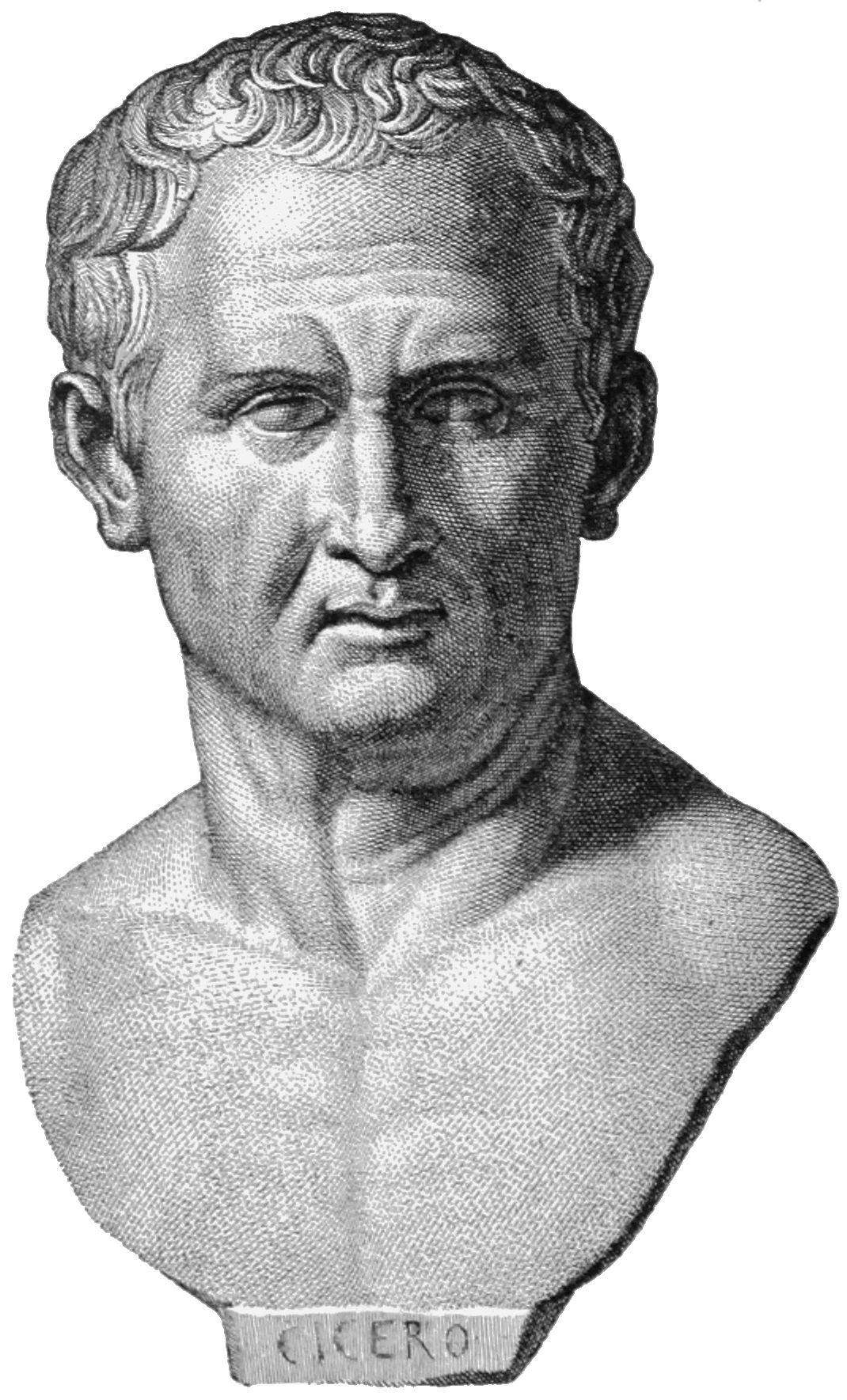
Cicero, from an ancient marble bust

Pro Roscio Amerino is a defence speech given by Marcus Tullius Cicero on behalf of Sextus Roscius, a Roman citizen from the municipality of Amelia accused of murdering his father. Delivered in 80 BC, it was Cicero's first major public case. It is also his second-earliest surviving speech (after the Pro Quinctio).

== Background ==
Cicero's narrative, outlining the 'pact' (societas) centred around Chrysogonus, is the basis for our understanding of the events leading up to the trial. It is worth remembering, however, that we only have Cicero's version, and some scholars have questioned the truthfulness of his account. For example, in his authoritative commentary on the speech, Andrew Dyck believes that Roscius Capito's involvement in the 'pact' was minimal: all Cicero can say with certainty is that Capito was the first person at Ameria to hear about the murder, which allegedly makes him a suspect in the case. Summarising his views on Cicero's case, Dyck writes:

C. [= Cicero] criticizes the prosecutor, Gaius Erucius, for presenting a weak case ... In fact, C. himself did not have much material; the only evidence he adduces is a decree passed by the decurions of Ameria declaring that the elder Roscius was wrongly proscribed and the son should receive his property back. He holds no witnesses in prospect, merely trying to intimidate a prospective prosecution witness ... In fact, C.'s lengthy speech in defense of his client is mostly the product of his imagination, deployed to derive maximum advantage from scanty materials.

=== Murder of Sex. Roscius senior ===
The elder Sextus Roscius was a wealthy landowner and distinguished citizen of Ameria, a municipium in southern Umbria. He had influential connections in Rome, most notably with the prestigious Caecilii Metelli, and, according to Cicero, he had supported the cause of Sulla during the civil wars of the 80s.

In 82 BC, Sulla successfully became dictator, and initiated a series of state-sanctioned murders known as the proscriptions. The consequences of being proscribed included the death sentence, and the public auction of all property belonging to the proscribed. Sulla set the end-date for the proscriptions as 1 June 81 BC, after which time no more names could be added to the list.

A few months after 1 June 81 BC, the elder Sextus Roscius was murdered near the Pallacine Baths in Rome while returning from a party. His son, Sextus Roscius the younger, was in Ameria at the time: however, a certain relative from Ameria, Titus Roscius Magnus, was present at Rome. Before the murder, Magnus and another relative, Titus Roscius Capito, had been engaged in a property dispute with the elder Sextus Roscius. Immediately upon hearing of the murder, Magnus sent his freedman, Mallius Glaucia, to Ameria in order to inform Capito of the news. According to Cicero, Capito then sent word to Lucius Cornelius Chrysogonus, a powerful freedman of the dictator Sulla, who was at his camp besieging the rebel town of Volaterrae.

=== Proscription and sale of property ===
After hearing of the murder, Chrysogonus entered the elder Sextus Roscius onto the list of the proscribed, even though the official terminus of 1 June had passed. Chrysogonus then proceeded to auction Sextus' thirteen estates, reportedly worth around 6 million sesterces. According to Cicero, no one dared bid against the powerful Chrysogonus: as a result, Chrysogonus himself purchased the entire property for a mere 2000 sesterces.

Crucially, Chrysogonus now named Magnus as his agent (procurator) in the purchase, meaning he took over ten of the estates on Chrysogonus' behalf. Magnus proceeded to evict the younger Sextus Roscius from his father's property. According to Cicero, all these events took place within a span of only nine days after the murder.

=== Embassy, flight, and trial ===
Outraged at the eviction of the younger Sextus Roscius, the decuriones of Ameria sent an embassy of ten prominent men (decem primi) to Sulla's camp at Volaterrae. However, Capito was included among the ten: and, according to Cicero, he secretly convinced Chrysogonus to grant him the remaining three of Sextus Roscius' estates. In return for this, Capito allegedly derailed the embassy by granting them false assurances that Chrysogonus would restore Sextus Roscius' property. As a result, the embassy left without ever meeting Sulla.

Fearful that the 'conspirators' would murder him too, the younger Sextus Roscius now fled to Rome. He sheltered in the house of Caecilia Metella, the wife of Appius Claudius Pulcher. In addition, Sextus enlisted the aid of several young nobles, including Marcus Valerius Messalla Niger, a Marcus Caecilius Metellus, and Publius Cornelius Scipio Nasica (the father of Metellus Scipio).

It was at this point, in 80 BC, that the three 'conspirators' decided to prosecute the younger Sextus Roscius, accusing him of murdering his father. They hired Gaius Erucius, a well-known professional prosecutor (accusator), and allegedly also bribed some witnesses to attest against Sextus. In addition, Roscius Magnus – who was now in charge of all of Sextus Roscius' property on behalf of Chrysogonus, including his slaves – refused to allow two slaves who had witnessed the murder to give evidence (under torture, as was the custom for testifying slaves). Sextus Roscius hired Cicero, who was aged only 26. Although Cicero had represented several clients in private civil cases, he had never undertaken a public case before: and his own explanation was that Sextus was unable to find anyone else to represent him, as everyone was terrified of Chrysogonus and his connections with Sulla.

== Trial ==
The charge was patricide (parricidium), and was heard in Sulla's recently established court for poisoning and murder (quaestio de veneficiis et sicariis). The ancient punishment for patricide was infamous: the parricida was stripped, beaten, and sewn into a leather sack, allegedly containing a dog, a cock, a monkey, and a snake; the sack was then thrown into the River Tiber or the sea.

It seems the prosecution based their argument upon the cui bono principle: namely, since Sextus Roscius had the most to gain from murdering his father, he was the most likely candidate.

=== Cicero's argument ===
After giving his own narrative (narratio) of events (¶15–29), Cicero splits his counter-argument into three main sections:

1.) Erucius' accusation of patricide is baseless (¶35–82);

- the younger Sextus Roscius had no motive to kill his father, with whom he was on good terms; in particular, the father never planned to disinherit his son.
- Sextus never had the opportunity to murder him, given that he was in Ameria at the time, and he lacked the connections or wherewithal to hire an assassin (sicarius).
- Sextus is a virtuous and distinguished young man, making him an implausible murderer.
- patricide is a serious allegation, and Erucius has failed to provide enough evidence to support it.

2.) in fact, the murder was certainly arranged by the two Titii Roscii, Magnus and Capito (¶83–121);

- they had plenty of motivation for the murder.
- they had the opportunity to arrange it, given that Magnus was in Rome at the time.
- their conduct was very suspicious after the murder: for example, Magnus sent Mallius Glaucia straight to Capito instead of the younger Sextus; Capito deliberately sabotaged the embassy to prevent justice; and Magnus refused to allow two slaves to testify (under torture) as witnesses.

3.) Chrysogonus is the mastermind behind the prosecution (¶122–142);

- although he had no part in the murder, Chrysogonus was quickly brought into the conspiracy.
- Chrysogonus illegally proscribed Sextus Roscius after the terminal date of 1 June 81 BC, and then bought the estates himself for a minuscule amount.
- Chrysogonus ordered the prosecution of the younger Sextus Roscius, in order to remove the only potential competitor for the estates.
- such treacherous conduct fits Chrysogonus' personality, since he lives a debauched, extravagant lifestyle.

=== Treatment of Sulla ===
At the end of the speech (peroratio), Cicero dramatically appeals to the jury of senators, calling on them to make an example of Chrysogonus: by rejecting him and his false accusations, they can enhance the cause of the nobility, and help end the lawlessness and corruption of the present times.

Although this involves explicit criticism of the proscriptions and the Sullan regime, Cicero is very careful to absolve Sulla himself of any blame. He calls Sulla a 'most illustrious and valiant citizen' (viro clarissimo et fortissimo), and even compares Sulla to the all-powerful father of the gods, Jupiter – though some scholars have seen this latter passage as 'ironic', 'insincere' or 'double-edged'.

=== Outcome and aftermath ===
Cicero was successful, and Sextus Roscius was acquitted. However, since Cicero was only defending Sextus from the specific charge of patricide, it is not known if Sextus ever recovered his father's land.

According to Cicero himself, the victory brought him great fame, and he was instantly considered one of the foremost advocates in Rome. Nevertheless, Cicero soon left the city to tour Greece and Asia Minor. Plutarch claims this journey was motivated by fear of Sulla, given that Cicero had challenged Chrysogonus and criticised the Sullan regime. However, Cicero himself states that the trip was to hone his skills as an orator and improve his weak physical fitness, and makes no reference to fear of Sulla.

Looking back after nearly forty years, Cicero later felt embarrassed by the immature style and florid language he had used. Nonetheless, he remained fond of the speech, and was particularly proud that he alone had been brave enough to challenge Chrysogonus contra L. Sullae dominantis opes ('in the face of the influence of Lucius Sulla the despot').

== Scholarly observations of the speech ==
=== The legal dilemma ===
"The Dilemma" of the speech as seen by W. B. Sedgwick is as follows:

If Roscius I (the father) was proscribed, Roscius II (the son) could not be prosecuted for his murder; if he was not proscribed, the property was illegally sold.

Sedgwick claimed in his 1934 article in The Classical Review that Cicero avoided addressing this dilemma because Chrysogonus had already removed the elder Sextus Roscius' name from the proscription list. Sedgwick claims that Chrysogonus promised the Amerian embassy to leave by promising to set everything right himself, and by taking the elder Roscius' name off the proscription lists as an act of good faith towards the delegation. This act on Chrysogonus' part necessitated the charge brought against the younger Roscius, in order to clear the former as well as the T. Roscii of all wrongdoing. Furthermore, Sedgwick claims that, with the younger Roscius removed, "no questions would be asked".

In an article written by T. E. Kinsey for Mnemosyne some thirty years later, Sedgwick's hypothesis is called into question. Kinsey distinguishes two different meanings for the word proscriptus, termed by Kinsey the "strict sense" and the "narrow sense". The "strict sense" referred to those whose names had actually been written on the Lex de Proscriptione at the time of its original publication and proclamation. Regarding the "narrow sense" Kinsey proposes that, after the publication of the original law of proscriptions, Sulla and his close supporters kept a running list of enemies both alive and dead who were not included in the original law. Kinsey believes that the delegation of men from Ameria that went to Sulla's camp had no direct knowledge as to why the elder Roscius had been murdered and why his property had been seized. Kinsey states that the members of the delegation (except Capito) assumed that the elder Roscius had been proscriptus in the strict sense. When the delegation pressed Chrysogonus on this, the latter asserted that Roscius had mistakenly been proscriptus in the "narrow sense". Chrysogonus, having appeased the delegation for the meantime, then went after the younger Roscius in an effort to end all speculation in the matter. Kinsey then goes on to address why Cicero did not employ the second part of the dilemma in his defence. Throughout his speech, Cicero consistently states that the younger Roscius only wished to be acquitted and that he will not seek to recover his inheritance. Kinsey proposes that many people had profited from the proscriptions (perhaps even members of the jury), and that the younger Roscius was less likely to be "acquitted if it meant the beginning of a long period of reprisal and restitution". Therefore, Chrysogonus, along with anyone else who might have been nervous about the younger Sextus' acquittal, would be reassured.

=== Publication ===
There is some debate about whether the speech that is extant is the original speech. Some scholars believe that the extant speech varies considerably from the one given, mainly because Cicero was unlikely to have delivered such strong criticisms of Sulla in the oppressive climate of the time. Therefore, these criticisms must have been added by Cicero at a later date, perhaps 77 BC, after Sulla's death. However, others believe that the identified criticisms of Sulla "are, on the surface at least, complimentary". They suggest that the extant speech was written immediately after Cicero delivered it, exactly as given, to allow for some instances of improvisation. This theory is further countered by debate over the supposed "complimentary" passages as being actually ironically critical. The first theory gains further weight from the fact that Cicero later references his defence of Roscius as evidence of resisting dictators. This would indicate that some revisions may have been made to improve his image.

=== Urban vs. rural stereotypes ===
The allusion to the grace and virtue of a country life vs. the vice and corruption of an urban one are very common motifs in Cicero's defence of Roscius. He begins by parading the virtues of the hard-working farmer who was the very foundation of the glorious city of Rome. Here, he is appealing to the traditional historical account of the foundation of Rome. By tying his client in with the rural and his enemies with the urban, he conveys to his audience a stereotype that leaves his enemies suspect for their greedy amoral city ways. The idea of the virtuous farmer and vice-ridden city dweller serves as a whole-sale substitute for fact in his case against Magnus, Capito and by extension Chrysogonus."

Where most of the Roman audience would have assumed that a father who did not like his son would give him over to a farm, which was viewed as slave work, as punishment, Cicero paints the virtues of the farm in such a light as to assume that the elder Roscius liked his son, and thus endowed him with the wonderful responsibility that the farm represents: productive and self-sustaining. Cicero fails to produce much evidence, but denies the assumption that the father relegated his son to the farm because the younger Roscius had incurred too much debt.

=== Use of comic motifs in the speech ===
At one point during the speech, Cicero turns Erucius' argument for prosecution against him by utilizing a metaphor derived from the popular stage. Cicero refers to the comedic play Hypobolimaeus, rewritten by the Roman playwright Caecilius Statius from the original written by Menander, both now lost. The play's plot centres on a father with two sons, one of which remains of the farms in the countryside and the other stays with the father in the city. This situation matched Sextus Roscius' family situation, before his father's murder. The great advantage of using this play as a metaphor in Cicero's speech is explained by Byron Harries, who goes into great detail on the implications of the metaphor and its intended reaction among the jury. Harries also focuses on the relationship between comedic motifs in Roman plays and the Roman family.

=== Gladiatorial metaphors in the speech ===
August M. Imholtz, Jr. believed that Cicero's use of certain terms such as 'gladiator' and 'gladiator instructor' served as metaphors for assassin, executor and butcher. Many of the Latin words had etymologies coming directly from Etruscan, which Imholtz claims Cicero intentionally employed to heighten the dramatic effect of his speech. The intensity of the Latin oration, coupled with Cicero's intensely illustrative language regarding his characterization of Magnus and Capito, both greatly benefited Cicero's defence.

== In popular culture ==
- The trial of Sextus Roscius is depicted in Steven Saylor's first Roma Sub Rosa mystery novel, Roman Blood.
- Colleen McCullough's novel Fortune's Favorites, part of her Masters of Rome series, also dramatizes the trial.
- The trial is dramatized in the BBC documentary series Timewatch in the episode "Murder in Rome" (2005), starring Paul Rhys as Cicero and Mark McGann as Sextus Roscius.
- Big Finish Productions adapted the trial of Sextus Roscius in Cicero by David Llewellyn. Sextus Roscius is portrayed by Simon Ludders.

== Bibliography ==
- Berry, D. H., trans. Cicero Defense Speeches. New York: Oxford University Press, 2000.
- Berry, D. H. "The Publication of Cicero's Pro Roscio Amerino". Mnemosyne 57, vol. 1 (2004): 80–87.
- Donkin, E. H. "Cicero Pro Roscio Amerino", ed. After Karl Hamm.
- Dyck, Andrew R. Cicero: Pro Sexto Roscio. Cambridge: Cambridge University Press, 2010.
- Freese, John. H. Cicero: The Speeches. London: Loeb Classical Library, 1930.
- Harries, Byron. "Acting the part: techniques of the comedic stage in Cicero's early speeches". In Cicero on the Attack, edited by Joan Booth, 134–136. Swansea: The Classical Press of Wales, 2007.
- Imholtz, August A. "Gladiatorial Metaphors in Cicero's Sex. Roscio Ameria". The Classical World 65, no. 7 (March 1972): 228–230.
- Kinsey, T. E. "A Dilemma in Pro Roscio Ameria". Mnemosyne' 19, fasc. 3 (1966): 270–271.
- Plutarch, and John Dryden, trans. "Sylla".
- Sedgwick, W. B. "Cicero's Conduct of the Case Pro Roscio". The Classical Review 48, no. 1 (February 1934): 13.
