= The House of the Vestals =

- First edition
- Author: Steven Saylor
- Language: English
- Series: Roma Sub Rosa
- Genre: Historical novel
- Publisher: St. Martin's Press
- Publication date: 1997
- Publication place: United States
- Media type: Print (hardback & paperback)
- Pages: 288 pp
- ISBN: 978-0312154448
- Preceded by: A Murder on the Appian Way
- Followed by: Rubicon

The House of the Vestals is a collection of short stories by American author Steven Saylor, first published by St. Martin's Press in 1997. It is the sixth book in his Roma Sub Rosa series of mystery stories set in the final decades of the Roman Republic. The main character is the Roman sleuth Gordianus the Finder.

== Plot summary ==
This collection of short stories are set in the years between 90 BC and 72 BC, and tell the tales of how Gordianus first met his slave, and later wife, Bethesda; how he met his loyal manservant Belbo; of his friendship with his generous patron Lucius Claudius, as well as other tales. He also runs into important historical figures, such as Publius Clodius Pulcher and a young Caesar.

=== Death Wears a Mask ===
September 80 BC: Gordianus and his adopted son, Eco, visit the theater and are drawn into a murder investigation.

N.B. This story takes place shortly after the events of Roman Blood, when Gordianus has adopted his young son, Eco, who is still mute.

=== The Tale of the Treasure House ===
Summer 80 BC: While they are relaxing at home, Bethesda tells Gordianus the classic Egyptian folk tale of King Rhampsinitus and his treasure vault.

=== A Will Is a Way ===
May 78 BC: Gordianus meets his future patron, Lucius Claudius, who needs help with a mystery.

=== The Lemures ===
October 78 BC: An old soldier is haunted by visions of his victims during Sulla's civil wars, and a relative of the late dictator is found dead.

=== Little Caesar and the Pirates ===
Spring and summer, 77 BC: Gordianus is hired to deliver a ransom to pirates who have kidnapped a nobleman's young stepson, in a case which bears a suspicious similarity to the young Julius Caesar's kidnapping. Along the way, Gordianus acquires his slave and loyal bodyguard, Belbo.

=== The Disappearance of the Saturnalia Silver ===
December 77 BC: Gordianus must help his patron Lucius Claudius recover his lost set of silver items made for the Saturnalia celebrations.

=== King Bee and Honey ===
April 76 BC: Invited for a pleasant holiday at Lucius Claudius's country estate, Gordianus and his family are interrupted by the sudden death of another guest, whose wife suspects poisoning as the cause of death.

=== The Alexandrian Cat ===
90 BC: While living in Alexandria at the age of twenty, Gordianus must investigate the murder of a domestic cat, sacred to the Egyptians, before it triggers a riot. The story is related by Gordianus to Lucius Claudius in the summer of 74 BC.

N.B. The novel The Seven Wonders, which was published later, acts as a prequel to this story.

=== The House of the Vestals ===
Spring 73 BC: In the titular story of the collection, Gordianus is called to the Temple of Vesta in the middle of the night, to see if there is any truth to the accusation that Lucius Sergius Catalina has had an affair with a Vestal Virgin.
