= The Venus Throw =

2005 historical novel by Steven Saylor

- First edition
- Author: Steven Saylor
- Language: English
- Series: Roma Sub Rosa
- Genre: Historical novel
- Publisher: St. Martin's Press
- Publication date: 1995
- Publication place: United States
- Media type: Print (hardback & paperback)
- Pages: 308 pp
- ISBN: 978-0312119126
- Preceded by: Catilina's Riddle
- Followed by: A Murder on the Appian Way

The Venus Throw is a historical novel by American author Steven Saylor, first published by St. Martin's Press in 1995. It is the fourth book in his Roma Sub Rosa series of mystery novels set in the final decades of the Roman Republic. The main character is the Roman sleuth Gordianus the Finder.

== Plot summary ==
The year is 56 BC. Gordianus is visited in disguise by his old friend and teacher Dio, a diplomat who led an Egyptian delegation to Rome. Dissatisfied with their king, Ptolemy XII, the contingent planned to appeal to Rome's Senate. However, Dio reveals that he is the last member of the delegation and implores Gordianus to keep him alive. His companion, a eunuch by the name of Trygonion, also appeals to Gordianus despite his clear dislike for the philosopher. Hesitating due to the potential danger, Gordianus asks Bethesda and his daughter, Diana, to serve dinner to his late night guests while he deliberates. Gordianus ultimately rejects the philosopher's plea, citing his plans to visit his second son Meto, currently campaigning with Julius Caesar.

In the morning, Gordianus and his eldest son, Eco, head out for their month-long visit. Upon returning, Gordianus learns that Dio was stabbed to death on the very night that he had visited. Before fully processing the news, Belbo announces that Trygonion has called upon him yet again. Revealing himself to be an agent of the scandalous widow, Clodia, Gordianus agrees to meet with her out of curiosity. Arriving at her horti on the Tiber, he is introduced to the scantily clad Clodia, her trusted slave, Chrysis, and her equally infamous brother, Clodius. Believing that Marcus Caelius' debts to Pompey, who wishes to keep Ptolemey XII in power, motivated him to murder the philosopher, Clodia hires Gordianus to find evidence against her former lover. Reluctantly agreeing, Gordianus heads to the Subura to confer with Eco. Knowing the scandal attached to Clodia and her brother, Clodius, Eco unsuccessfully urges his father to drop the case. Upon leaving his son, Gordianus and his bodyguard, Belbo, realize they are being followed.

The next day, Gordianus visits the last two places Dio stayed. Beginning with the house of Lucius Lucceius, where Dio's slave was accidentally poisoned instead of him, Gordianus confronts Lucius. Mistakenly believing that Cicero sent him, Lucius is initially talkative before realizing the truth. From then on, Lucius insists that the slave died of natural causes and that Dio was merely paranoid. On his way out, Lucius' wife ushers Gordianus over. Confirming that her husband is in denial, she reveals that the two slaves who prepared Dio's food had suspiciously gone out that day, returning with some mysterious spices. After Dio's death, the two attempted to buy their freedom with a staggering amount of silver only to be condemned to the mines instead.

Gordianus heads for Titus Coponius' house, where Dio met his untimely death. While there, Gordianus learns that the philosopher regularly abused one of Titus Coponius' slave girls, Zotica, who was with him the night that he was murdered. Unfortunately, Titus Coponius' slave, Philo, reveals that she has been sold. Gordianus implores Eco to find her.

Once again, Clodia summons Gordianus. This time, she asks him to help thwart Caelius' alleged plans to poison her. Acquiescing, he shows up to the Senian baths the next day expecting to witness a handoff of the poison from Caelius' friend, Licinius, to one of Clodia's slaves. Instructed to wait in the changing rooms for Clodia's contact, he recognizes the man who has been following him. Revealed to be the poet Catullus, Gordianus mistakenly believes him to be Clodia's contact until he sees her slave, Barnabas, approach him. Despite her scheme, Licinius escapes with the poison. Compelled by Chrysis to explain the afternoon's events, Gordianus finds himself back at Clodia's house only to be entertained by her brother instead. Gordianus finds himself drinking and eating with Clodius before eventually falling asleep. Fearing Bethesda's wrath, he begins to head home before realizing he is being followed once again. Confronting his follower, Catullus, the poet convinces Gordianus to have another drink with him where he reveals his unrequited love for Clodia and hatred for Caelius.

Gordianus spends the next day continuing his search for evidence against Caelius. Yielding nothing, he heads home in the afternoon, only to find Clodia's retinue there. Fearing Bethesda's jealousy and earlier wrath, Gordianus is surprised to find the two women, along with his daughter, calmly conversing in the garden. Remaining hidden, he eavesdrops on them as they exchange traumatic tales. To Gordianus' surprise, he learns that his wife was once owned by a cruel and powerful Egyptian who sadistically tied her mother to a hook before sexually assaulting her. Once her mother died from his abuse, Bethesda reveals that she fought back when he attempted to tie her up and was eventually sold to Gordianus. Distressed, Gordianus leaves the women alone.

The next day, Clodia calls for Gordianus after escaping a poisoning attempt from none other than Chrysis. He deduces that the poison used was Gorgon's hair, a substance currently in his possession. Although Clodia only took a small amount, she appears to be suffering from its effects. Nonetheless, she remains determined to go to the trial and host her annual party the next day.

Following the first day of the trial, Gordianus and Bethesda attend Clodia's party in honor of Cybele. While there, Clodia tries to coerce Gordianus into testifying against Caelius, hinting that she would bribe him. Oblivious to the bribery, Gordianus agrees to help the beautiful lady.

Upon returning home, he finds himself restless due to the poisoning attempt and decides to inspect his Pyxis of Gorgon's hair. Leaving his wife with Diana, he discovers that his lockbox has been broken into. To his dismay, he finds a scuffed earring in place of the missing powder. Recognizing it as one of Bethesda's, he rushes into Diana's room and accuses her of deceit. Bethesda coolly admits to it, sending her husband storming out to confront Clodia. Reaching her house, Gordianus accuses Clodia of colluding with his wife to fake the poisoning attempt. Despite her denial, Gordianus refuses to testify and finds himself in Catullus' company for the night.

The next day, the trial begins with Caelius' defense. While standing at the back, Gordianus spots Eco who implores his father to come home with him to speak with the slave, Zotica. She reveals that Dio regularly abused her at Titus Coponius' by tying her to a hook and sexually assaulting her. On the night of his death, Zotica states that Dio died before anyone stabbed him. Recognizing the effects of Gorgon's hair from her description, Gordianus rushes back to the trial.

He arrives in time to hear Cicero's defamation of Clodia as part of his defense. Thanks to his oration, famously known as Pro Caelio, his former protégé is acquitted. Disturbed by Zotica's account and the outcome of the trial, Gordianus wanders around the city before finding himself at the tavern Catullus took him to. There, Gordianus runs into Caelius, who is, surprisingly, with Catullus. Demanding the truth from Caelius, the newly acquitted man admits to stabbing Dio to erase his debt to Pompey and attempt to poison Clodia. Upon hearing about the poisoning, Catullus attacks him, leading to Caelius' bodyguards throwing him and Gordianus out.

After spending the night at Eco's house, Gordianus still finds himself unable to face his wife, so he decides to visit Clodia, only to discover that she has fled the city. Trudging back to Eco's, he is surprised to see his second son, Meto, there. Hearing their uncle, Eco's twins, Titiana and Titus, fly into the room. Upon seeing Titiana, Gordianus questions his granddaughter about a piece of jewelry pinned to her tunic. Recognizing it as the twin of the one from his lockbox, Gordianus realizes that he has finally solved the mystery.

At that moment, his wife appears and the two leave the others for their long awaited discussion. Gordianus apologizes for his lack of faith in her and states that he now understands her. He reveals that he knows of her past with Dio and knows that she did not poison him despite her insistence that she did.

Later, he summons Diana, who is revealed to be the true culprit behind Dio's death. Despite Bethesda's attempt to take the fall, Gordianus reveals that he realized the truth once he asked his granddaughter where she got the earring from. Knowing that Diana did it on behalf of her mother, Gordianus says that he is proud of her and accepts that she will always remain a mystery to him.
