= A Mist of Prophecies =

2002 novel by Steven Saylor

- First edition
- Author: Steven Saylor
- Language: English
- Series: Roma Sub Rosa
- Genre: Historical novel
- Publisher: St. Martin's Minotaur
- Publication date: 2002
- Publication place: United States
- Media type: Print (hardback & paperback)
- Pages: 270 pp
- ISBN: 978-0312271213
- Preceded by: Last Seen in Massilia
- Followed by: The Judgment of Caesar

A Mist of Prophecies is a historical novel by American author Steven Saylor, first published by St. Martin's Press in 2002. It is the ninth book in his Roma Sub Rosa series of mystery stories set in the final decades of the Roman Republic. The main character is the Roman sleuth Gordianus the Finder.

== Plot summary ==
The year is 48 BC. Caesar and Pompey clash across the sea in Greece while Milo and Caelius stir up trouble in Italy. Meanwhile, in Rome, the beautiful and mysterious seeress called Cassandra is poisoned, and dies in the arms of Gordianus in the market. With no one to claim the body, Gordianus makes her funeral arrangements which is surprisingly attended by the seven most powerful women in Rome—Terentia, Antonia, Cytheris, Fulvia, Fausta, Calpurnia, and Clodia. Without a word to him or to each other, the women leave the pyre soon after.

The next day, Gordianus calls on the first of these women, Terentia. Home with her sister, the Vestal Fabia, the pair recall how they met Cassandra. Finding her on the temple steps, on the very day Gordianus first laid eyes on her, Fabia took her in and introduced her to Terentia, with the pair believing in Cassandra's gift of prophecy.

He next visits Fulvia, now twice-widowed following her second husband Curio's death in Africa. Fulvia reveals that she met Cassandra a couple months before he or Terentia did. Bringing the seeress back to her own home, Fulvia recalls how Cassandra foresaw Curio's death. Housing her for the next couple of days, Fulvia finally receives news of his death, confirming Cassandra's vision.

Gordianus and Davus visit Antonia, Marc Antony's wife. After complaining about her husband, she explains how she sought Cassandra out a couple months before after hearing about Fulvia's encounter with her. Witnessing Cassandra back at her home, Antonia declares her to be a fraud and throws her out—but not before setting a tail on her. Later, it is revealed that Cassandra went directly to Cytheris, Marc Antony's lover.

They next visit Cytheris, mimicking Cassandra's actions months before. The actress reveals that she met Cassandra in her native city of Alexandria when they were both children. In their youth, Cassandra was known to occasionally have seizures. Unsure whether Cassandra was acting, Cytheris admits to asking Cassandra to give Antonia a fake prophecy as a prank. While confessing she knows nothing about Cassandra's death, Cytheris reveals that Rupa, the mute young man seen with Cassandra, was her brother.

Meanwhile, Gordianus continues reminiscing on his time with the young Cassandra in flashbacks, including the start of their affair while his wife of many years lay at home dying. Despite the fact that she was young enough to be his granddaughter, he believes that the two fell in love.

Once again taking Davus, the pair visit Fausta, Sulla's daughter and Milo's estranged wife. Similarly to the others, it is revealed that Cassandra came by and spoke gibberish, leaving Fausta uncertain about Cassandra's so-called gifts.

Leaving Fausta, the two seek out Clodia, the other object of Gordianus' illicit desires. Quickly noting that Gordianus had been in love with Cassandra, he shares his belief that the seeress' death was related to Milo and Caelius' revolt. Avoiding all his questions about Cassandra, Gordianus decides to visit her another time.

It is revealed that Milo and Caelius approached Gordianus the last time he saw Cassandra illicitly. The two men attempted to conscript Gordianus into their plans for revolution. When he refuses, they threaten to kill him but drug him instead. Momentarily gaining consciousness, Gordianus overhears Caelius arguing about keeping him alive due to a promise made to the witch, presumably Cassandra. After 24 hours, he awakes and goes to Cassandra's room, only to find it stripped bare.

With only one of the seven women left, Gordianus ponders on how to approach Calpurnia, Caesar's wife. Beating him to the punch, Calpurnia calls upon him instead. Traveling by litter, he is delivered to a secret house of Caesar's. Calpurnia reveals this was Cassandra's true residence as one of Caesar's spies. On Calpurnia's advice, Caesar recruited a talented actress from Alexandria to play a mad seeress. Using the intel she received from Caesar, Cassandra would then fake a fit and utter a "prophecy" based on what she knew about the person. Despite Gordianus' beliefs, Calpurnia admits that Caelius had been in touch with Clodia during the last few months. Getting wind of Caelius' plans, she orders Cassandra to give him and Milo a false prophecy of doom to stop their revolt. Before leaving, she asks Gordianus to let her know what he uncovers about Cassandra's death.

While tending to Bethesda the next few days, as he should have been all along, news reaches him that both Milo and Caelius have died. Pondering the latest news, Gordianus heads for Clodia's house.

She confirms that she had renewed her affair with Caelius and reveals that she stopped him from killing Gordianus. Cruelly accusing her of killing Cassandra after using her to lead Caelius to his death, Clodia reveals that she truly loved him. Before Caelius set off, he sent Clodia a note sharing that Cassandra had prophesied a victory to Milo, against Calpurnia's direct orders. Putting the pieces together, Gordianus reports to Calpurnia before confronting Fausta.

Fausta confesses to bribing Cassandra to give Milo a prophecy of victory to ensure his demise. When the actress came to collect the rest of her payment, Fausta poisoned her instead. Having confessed everything, she then takes poison herself, committing suicide.

Back at Calpurnia's house, she informs Gordianus and Davus that Caesar has triumphed. Fleeing, Pompey has run to Egypt with Caesar hot on his tail. Surprisingly, Cassandra's brother, Rupa, steps forward with a letter written by his sister. In the letter, she requests that Calpurnia give Gordianus the money she earned as a spy to pay off his debts in return for him adopting Rupa.

With this newfound windfall, Gordianus and Bethesda prepare to travel to Egypt to find a cure for her malady. Since pregnant, Gordianus forces Diana to stay behind with Davus. Instead, he plans to bring Rupa and Cassandra's ashes despite Diana's disgust. The two ponder what Egypt holds for their family.
