= The Throne of Caesar =

2018 novel by Steven Saylor

- First US edition
- Author: Steven Saylor
- Language: English language
- Series: Roma Sub Rosa
- Genre: Historical mystery
- Publisher: Minotaur Books (US); Constable Press (UK)
- Publication date: February 10, 2018
- Publication place: United States
- Media type: Print (hardback)
- Pages: 392 pp
- ISBN: 978-1250087126
- Preceded by: The Triumph of Caesar

The Throne of Caesar is a historical mystery novel by American author Steven Saylor, first published by Minotaur Books in 2018. It is the thirteenth book in his Roma Sub Rosa series of mystery stories set in the final decades of the Roman Republic. The main character is the Roman sleuth Gordianus the Finder.

The book begins on March 10 and ends on March 23, 44 B.C. It describes the assassination of Julius Caesar on March 15, the Ides of March.
