= Clodia (wife of Metellus) =

Roman aristocrat (born 95/94 BC)

- Born: c. 97–95 BCE
- Died: After 45 BCE
- Spouse: Quintus Caecilius Metellus Celer
- Children: Caecilia Metella
- Father: Appius Claudius Pulcher

Clodia, often known in modern scholarship as Clodia Metelli (Clodia, the wife of Metellus), (c. 97–95 BCE – after 45 BCE) was a Roman patrician and member of the Claudia gens, whose members held multiple high-ranking political offices. Clodia was involved in Roman politics as the wife of Quintus Caecilius Metellus Celer, who held the consulship, and sister of Publius Clodius Pulcher, who led political mobs.

Cicero, who was a political enemy of Clodius, is the only certain contemporary source for Clodia, and his depiction of her varies greatly between his public and private writing. Born to Appius Claudius Pulcher, Clodia married Celer between c. 82–79 BCE. She started to openly support her brother's political career following the death of her husband in 59 BCE. Clodia was the chief prosecution witness in the trial of Cicero's protégé, Marcus Caelius Rufus. Cicero gave his Pro Caelio against Clodia in this trial, in which he accused her of seeking revenge against her former lover, having poisoned Celer, and having sex with Clodius. Her last known mention in the historical record is Cicero's attempt to purchase her garden on the Tiber River.

The poet Catullus wrote poems featuring Lesbia, which Ovid and Apuleius said was a pseudonym. Since the 16th century Lesbia has been frequently considered to have been Clodia and historians like Ludwig Schwabe used Lesbia as sourcing for Clodia's life. However, this identification is disputed due to the dating of Catullus's poems and the relation between the historical Rufus and the Rufus depicted by Catullus.

== Sources ==
Cicero, in his Pro Caelio and personal letters, is the only contemporary source for the life of Clodia and these records are from 62–56 BC and in the 40s BCE. The Pro Caelio was an oration by Cicero meant to discredit Clodia. Clodia's depiction in the public Pro Caelio and the private letters of Cicero vary greatly because, according to Marilyn B. Skinner, she is "a one-dimensional caricature of a sex-crazy noblewoman sullied by incestuous relations with her youngest brother" in the Pro Caelio, but a "more complex personality who seems firmly in control of her sexual passions" in Cicero's letters. The historian Plutarch briefly mentions Clodia in his Life of Cicero and incorporated many sexual allegations against her.

Lesbia, from the poetry of Catullus, has been used for sourcing the life of Clodia by some historians, such as Ludwig Schwabe. However, the connection between Lesbia and Clodia is disputed. The Oxford Classical Dictionary views the literary flourish used by Catullus for Lesbia as not being based in history.

== Name ==
Roman naming practices gave women one name while men were given two or three. The spelling of Clodia's name changed from Claudia in 62 BCE to Clodia in 56 BCE; it was theorized that she changed her name when her brother Publius Clodius Pulcher became a plebeian, a lower-class standing. Modern scholarship, including the Oxford Classical Dictionary, gives her the name Clodia Metelli based on her marriage to Quintus Caecilius Metellus Celer in order to distinguish her from other people.

== Early life and family ==
Clodia was born around c. 97–95 BCE as either the oldest of six children or second daughter of Appius Claudius Pulcher and an unknown mother; her mother might have been Caecilia Metella. She was a member of the Claudia gens, a higher-class patrician family, and her immediate family were the Claudii Pulchri.

Clodia's grandfather Appius Claudius Pulcher served as consul, the highest political office, in 143 BC. Her father served as consul in 79 BC and died while serving as the governor of Macedonia. Her brother Gaius held the military office of legate under Julius Caesar in Gaul in 58 BC and the military and magisterial office of praetor in 56 BCE. Her brother Appius Claudius Pulcher served as consul in 54 BCE. Two of her brothers-in-law also served as consuls.

Clodia is considered to have done either dancing or writing based on an account by Cicero, in which he described the sister of Clodius performing in interludes between plays. Plutarch claimed that she had the nickname Quadrantia (quarter of the Roman coin as). This nickname came from an incident in which one of her lovers gave her a bag filled with copper coins and said they were filled with silver. Historian Anise K. Strong compared the cheap price in Clodia's nickname to the average price of a Roman prostitute, as graffiti in Pompeii listed the prices ranging from 1 to 23 assēs. Cicero associated Clodia with bathhouses and implied that she might have traded sex for entry.

=== Marriage ===
Clodia married Celer, who held multiple positions in Roman politics; Celer was her cousin on her mother's side. Skinner placed the date of their marriage to after the return of Clodia's father from exile in 82 BCE, but before Clodia's father was elected consul in 79 BCE. Clodia had a daughter, Caecilia Metella. Clodia's son-in-law Lucius Caecilius Metellus served as tribune of the plebs.

Celer was appointed governor of Cisalpine Gaul; Skinner believes that Clodia did not join him as the wives of governors were not allowed to go with them. These restrictions were lifted under the reign of Tiberius in the 1st century CE. Celer died in 59 BCE and Cicero later accused Clodia of having poisoned him as Celer was in good health days before his death.

T. P. Wiseman argued that the house on the Palatine Hill that Clodia resided in belonged to her and not Celer as she was still using it three years after his death. The house shared a party wall with Quintus Lutatius Catulus Capitolinus' house, which later became a part of the House of Augustus by around 10 BCE.

=== Publius Clodius Pulcher ===
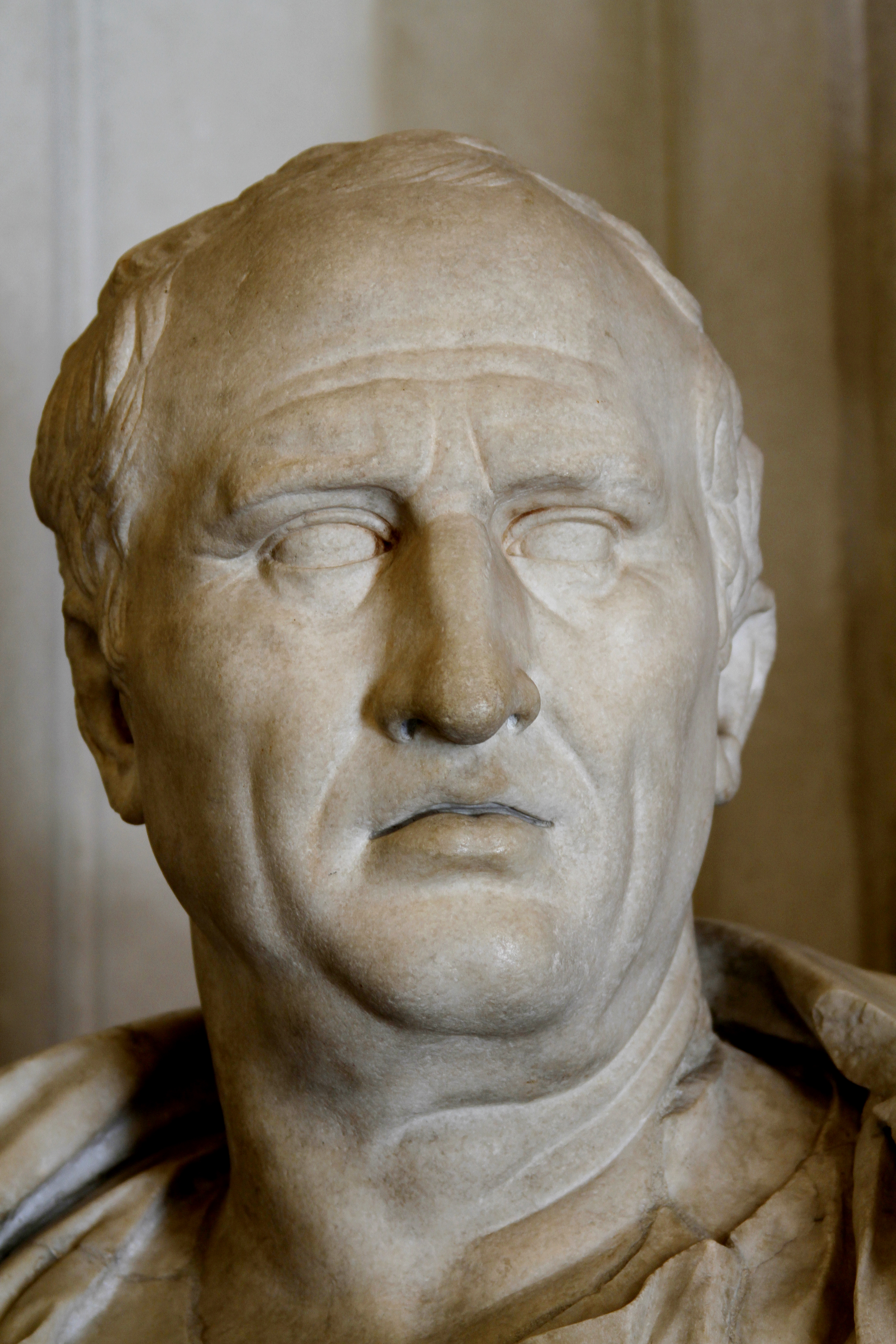
Cicero, an opponent of Clodia's brother Publius Clodius Pulcher, is the only contemporary source for the life of Clodia. Cicero defended Marcus Caelius Rufus against Clodia in his Pro Caelio.

Clodius was the youngest brother of Clodia. Following the death of Clodia's husband in 59 BCE she started to openly help her brother's political career. Clodius relied on the urban population of Rome and mob violence for his political support. He was initially allied with Cicero, but they had a falling out after Clodius was put on trial for sacrilege. Plutarch claimed that Clodia sought to marry Cicero in 61 BCE and that the suspicions of Terentia, Cicero's wife, caused the falling out between Cicero and Clodius. Clodius caused Cicero to be exiled for putting Roman citizens to death illegally. Cicero returned to Rome in 57 BCE and his continued political disputes with Clodius ended with Clodius being killed in 52 BCE by a mob of Titus Annius Milo's supporters.

Marcus Caelius Rufus was the protégé of Cicero. Clodius was able to have charges filed against Caelius; these five charges were inciting civil disturbance in Naples, assaulting Alexandrians in Pozzuoli, damaging Palla's property, the murder of Dio of Alexandria, and attempting to poison Clodia. Clodia was the chief prosecution witness against Caelius. She claimed that she loaned gold to Caelius to finance the plot and he later attempted to have her slaves poison her. Cicero defended Caelius in his Pro Caelio and accused Clodia of seeking revenge against her former lover Caelius, having poisoned Celer, and having sex with Clodius. Cicero referred to Clodia as a "Palatine Medea"; this was in reference to the mythological character who killed her children as a form of revenge. He used femina, the polite word for married aristocratic women, twice, but used the impolite word mulier 35 times. Caelius was acquitted of the charges.

Milo was placed on trial for the death of Clodius. Clodia was not mentioned during the trial, even in Cicero's Pro Milone, and there is no record of what she did for the mourning of Clodius. A theory states that Clodia did not actively participate in the mourning due to the humiliation Cicero inflicted on her during Caelius' trial. Skinner argued that either the historical record was incomplete or Clodia's actions were not noteworthy enough or irregular to be recorded.

== Later life ==
Wiseman believed that Clodia spent more of her time in Baiae, Solonium, or at her garden along the Tiber River after 56 BCE than in Rome; Wiseman noted that Clodia is absent from the historical record for her brother's funeral and that restrictions would prevent her from joining her other brothers while they served as proconsuls of the provinces of Asia and Cilicia. Titus Pomponius Atticus approached Clodia in May 45 BCE about selling her riverside gardens to Cicero; Lawrence Richardson Jr. believes that these gardens were located across from the Campus Martius. Cicero was searching for land to use for a memorial to his daughter Tullia. This is the last known mention of Clodia in historical records.

Cicero later wrote to Atticus stating "The Queen's flight does not upset me. I would like you to tell me what Clodia has done". This was written after Cleopatra fled Rome following the assassination of Julius Caesar in 44 BCE. It is unknown why Cicero mentioned Clodia and it is unknown if this was the wife or daughter of Metellus. Skinner theorizes that Clodia might have hosted Cleopatra at her garden estate near the Tiber. According to Skinner, Cleopatra, who was on her second visit to Rome and contesting a possible Roman annexation of Cyprus, would not have wanted to use housing from Caesar, who gave Cyprus to the Ptolemaic Kingdom. Cicero wrote that Cleopatra was using one of the gardens near the Tiber River as a residence.

== Lesbia ==
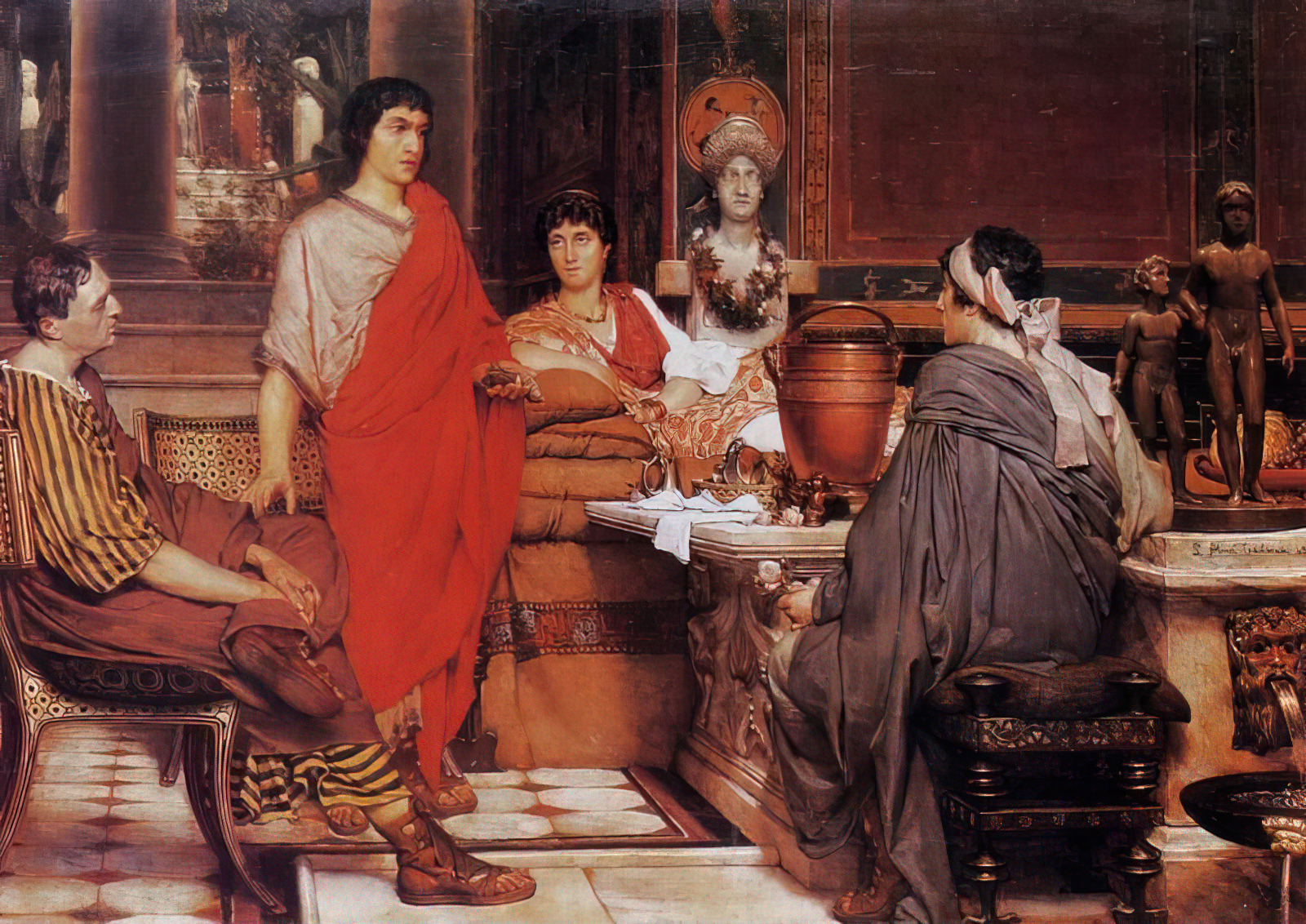
Catullus at Lesbia's (1865) by Lawrence Alma-Tadema

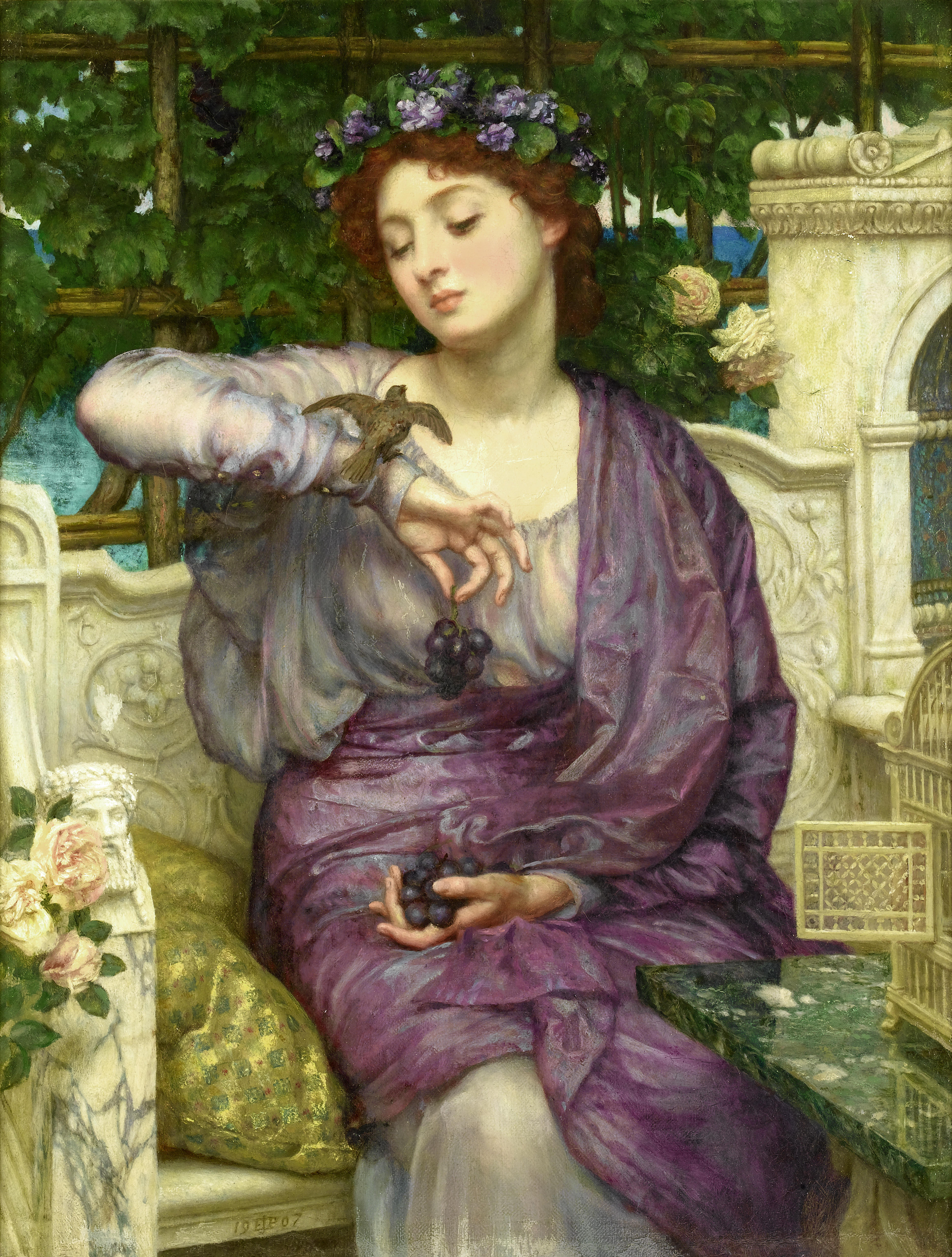
Lesbia and her Sparrow (1907) by Edward Poynter

The poet Ovid, in his Tristia (published in parts between 9 and 12 CE), wrote that the poet Catullus used falsum nomen Lesbia ("the false name 'Lesbia'") and confessed to being an adulterer. (Note: Lewis 2018, p. 130, n. 11, citing Ovid, Tristia 2.427–430.) In 158 or 159 CE, the writer Apuleius invoked Lesbia in his Apologia, a courtroom speech in which he defended himself against the charge of using magic. Apuleius, having been accused of using pseudonyms to hide the identity of boys addressed in his love poems, states that earlier poets did the same with the objects of their desires: he asserts that Catullus used the name Lesbia for a woman named Clodia. (Note: Gale 2021, p. 30, citing Apuleius, Apology 10.) Wiseman suggests that he may have acquired this identification from an earlier source, such as the biographer Suetonius's De Poetis ("On the Poets"), dated around the turn of the 2nd century CE, or from an older work in the same genre by Gaius Julius Hyginus, who came to Rome around 47 BCE.

=== Identification with Clodia ===
The identification of Lesbia as a woman named Clodia was known to the Venetian nobleman Marino Sanuto the Younger, who mentioned it in an account of a journey near Catullus's native Sirmio in 1483. The French humanist Marcus Antonius Muretus wrote in 1552 that Lesbia was one of the three women, all named Clodia, (Note: In Roman naming conventions, aristocratic women were named by the feminine form of their nomen gentilicum, or family name. Accordingly, all of the women in the same family shared a name.) who were sisters of Clodius. Dyson argues that it is "nearly certain" that this identification is correct. In poem 79, Catullus writes of "Lesbius" (the masculine form of Lesbia) as being pulcher ("beautiful"), echoing Clodius's cognomen.

Lesbia is frequently considered to have been Clodia. The identification dates at least to the 16th century. Schwabe, as part of a wider attempt to reconstruct Catullus's biography, argued for it in his Quaestiones Catullianae ("Catullan Questions") of 1862. Schwabe connected Catullus's portrayal of Lesbia to Clodia's unhappy relationship with her husband, and her reputation for adultery, both of which were claimed by Cicero, who castigated Clodia's character in his Pro Caelio. Holzberg calls the traditional biographical narrative of Catullus's life, into which Schwabe's reconstruction of the relationship is set, the "Catullus Romance". Dyson defends Schwabe's equation of Lesbia with Clodia by the references in Catullus's poems to "Caelius" and "Rufus" as lovers (or the same lover) of Lesbia, which she considers to refer to Marcus Caelius Rufus.

Since the name Lesbia is metrically equivalent to Clodia (both consisting of a dactyl: a "heavy" syllable followed by two "light" ones), knowledgeable readers of Catullus's poems could have replaced one with the other. If the identification of Lesbia with Clodia is correct, she would have been several years older than Catullus. (Note: Catullus is considered to have been born around 84 BCE, while Clodia was probably born before 90 BCE.) Schwabe considered that the relationship between Catullus and Clodia began in 61– 60 BCE, and ended, first temporarily and then (after a brief reconciliation) permanently, in 59–58 BCE.

=== Challenges to the Clodia hypothesis ===
While Clodia remains the favoured candidate for Lesbia in the 21st century, several scholars have opposed the identification as incompatible with the dates of Catullus's poems. The Scottish schoolmaster James Cranstoun, who published a translation of Catullus's poems in 1867, argued that Schwabe's identification of Lesbia as Clodia could not be correct, on the grounds that poems discussing Catullus's relationship with her, such as 11 and 43, must date to after Caesar took up his Gallic command in 58 BCE; since Metellus died in 59, Clodia could not have been the married Lesbia. (Note: Poem 11 refers to the "monuments of great Caesar" (Caesaris monimenta magni) in the Alps, between Italy and Gaul.) Max Rothstein, in 1923, similarly argued that the association with Clodia was unsound, arguing that the dates of the Lesbia poems, which he considered to fall between 56 and 54 BCE, were incompatible with that of Metellus's death in 59 BCE. Wiseman similarly dates Catullus's oeuvre to the mid-50s BC, and poem 36, set during a love affair, to the third quarter of 56 BCE; Clodia, according to Cicero in the Pro Caelio, remained unmarried at least until April 56, while Catullus always presents Lesbia as being married to another man.

Wiseman argues that the equation between Caelius Rufus and Catullus's "Rufus" is unsound, in part because Caelius Rufus was known as an elegant man and an excellent dancer, while Catullus's Rufus is described as having bad body odour and suffering from gout. Monica Gale further points out that Catullus, in poem 100, lists Caelius among the "flower of Veronese youth", while Cicero gives Caelius's native town as Interamnia Praetutiana in central Italy. Wiseman instead suggests that Catullus's Rufus may have been Quintus Pompeius Rufus or Quintus Numerius Rufus, both associates of Clodius, or one of many other noblemen by that cognomen known to have been active in Catullus's lifetime. Wilfried Stroh, writing on the Pro Caelio, argues that the relationship between Caelius and Clodia may have been invented by Cicero to suit his case, and consequently that Catullus's poems cannot securely be said to relate to the affair, since the identification of Caelius and Rufus hinges on the Pro Caelio.

== Cultural depictions ==
A chapter of Marcel Schwob's Imaginary Lives (1896) was dedicated to Clodia. W. G. Hardy, head of the classics department at the University of Alberta, wrote Turn Back the River (1938), a fictional biography of Clodia. Clodia has been featured in Jack Lindsay's Despoiling Venus (1935), Thornton Wilder's The Ides of March (1948), Steven Saylor's The Venus Throw (1995) and A Murder on the Appian Way (1996), and in John Maddox Roberts' SPQR series. Helen Dunmore's Counting the Stars (2008) portrays Lesbia, identified as Clodia, as resisting a proposal from Catullus to marry him after Metellus' death.

Catullus's poetry about Lesbia has been referenced by, imitated by, and inspired such poets as Marcantonio Flaminio, (Note: Wiseman 1985, p. 212. The work is Carmina 4.1.) Johannes Secundus George Lamb, William Wordsworth, (Note: Stead 2016, p. 166. The poem appeared, as "Lines Imitated from Catullus" and under the pseudonym "Mortimer", in the edition of 11 April 1798.) Lord Byron, (Note: Stead 2016, pp. 200–202. On Edleston, see Beaton 2013, p. 27.) John Keats, (Note: Stead 2016, pp. 279–280, citing Endymion 1.651–660.) Arthur Symons, and Anna Jackson. His poetry has also been adapted into music by Paul Hofhaimer, Thomas Campion, Ben Jonson, Darius Milhaud, (Note: Calinski 2021, p. 344. For the date, see Miller 2003, p. 258.) Gian Francesco Malipiero, Jan Novák, Carl Orff, and Alan Rawsthorne.

The popularity of Lesbia rose during the Baroque period and she was the subject of many 19th-century neoclassical and Victorian paintings. Lesbia is named as the subject of more than twenty works of post-classical visual art, more than any other character from Roman love elegy, and in several works of literature.

== See also ==
- Women in ancient Rome

== Works cited ==
=== Books ===
- Austin, R., ed. (1960). Cicero Pro M. Caelio Oratio (3 ed.). Oxford University Press. ISBN 0198144016.
- Beaton, Roderick (2013). Byron's War: Romantic Rebellion, Greek Revolution. Cambridge University Press. ISBN 9781107033085.
- Calinski, Tobias (2021). Catull in Bild und Ton: Untersuchungen zur Catull-Rezeption in Malerei und Komposition [Catullus in Image and Sound: Studies on the Reception of Catullus in Painting and Composition] (in German). Wissenschaftliche Buchgesellschaft. ISBN 9783534406159.
- Dyson, Julia (2007). "The Lesbia Poems". In Skinner, Marilyn (ed.). A Companion to Catullus. Chichester: Blackwell. pp. 254–275. doi:10.1002/9780470751565.ch14. ISBN 9781405135337.
- Fitzgerald, William (1995). Catullan Provocations: Lyric Poetry and the Drama of Position. Classics and Contemporary Thought. Vol. 1. Berkeley and Los Angeles: University of California Press. ISBN 0520200624.
- Gaisser, Julia (2017). "Elegy". In Moul, Victoria (ed.). A Guide to Neo-Latin Literature. Cambridge University Press. pp. 113–130. doi:10.1017/9781139248914. ISBN 9781139248914.
- Gale, Monica (2021). Catullus. Greece & Rome: New Surveys in the Classics. Vol. 51. Cambridge University Press. doi:10.1017/S0533245125000057. ISBN 9781009709798.
- Greene, Ellen (2007). "Catullus and Sappho". In Skinner, Marilyn (ed.). A Companion to Catullus. Chichester: Blackwell. pp. 131–150. doi:10.1002/9780470751565.ch8. ISBN 9781405135337.
- Grig, Lucy (2016). "Clodia". Oxford Classical Dictionary. Oxford University Press. ISBN 9780197851371.
- Martin, Charles (1992). Catullus. New Haven: Yale University Press. ISBN 0300052006.
- Miller, Catherine (2003). Jean Cocteau, Guillaume Apollinaire, Paul Claudel et le groupe des six: Rencontres poético-musicales autour des Mélodies et des Chansons [Jean Cocteau, Guillaume Apollinaire, Paul Claudel, and Les Six: Poetic-Musical Encounters Centered on Mélodies and Chansons] (in French). Mardaga. ISBN 2870098529.
- Oade, Stephanie (2024). Catullus in Twentieth-Century Music: Lyrics and Lyricism. Oxford University Press. doi:10.1093/9780198918714.001.0001. ISBN 9780198918684.
- Schwabe, Ludwig (1862). Quaestiones Catullianae [Catullan Questions]. C. Valerii Catulli Liber (in Latin). Vol. 1. Giessen: J. Ricker. OCLC 18915264.
- Skinner, Marilyn (2011). Clodia Metelli: The Tribune's Sister. Oxford University Press. ISBN 9780195375008.
- Stead, Henry (2016). A Cockney Catullus: The Reception of Catullus in Romantic Britain, 1795–1821. Classical Presences. Oxford University Press. ISBN 9780198744887.
- Stroh, Wilfried (1975). Taxis und Taktik: Die advokatische Dispositionskunst in Ciceros Gerichtsreden [Taxis and Tactics: The Art of Strategic Disposition in Cicero's Forensic Orations] (in German). Stuttgart: B. G. Teubner. doi:10.1515/9783110951318. ISBN 3519074060.
- Strong, Anise (2016). Prostitutes and Matrons in the Roman World. Cambridge University Press. ISBN 9781316563083.
- Williams, Gareth (2006). "Ovid's Exile Poetry: Tristia, Epistulae ex Ponto and Ibis". In Hardie, Philip (ed.). The Cambridge Companion to Ovid. Cambridge University Press. pp. 233–245. doi:10.1017/CCOL0521772818. ISBN 9780511998966.
- Wiseman, T. (1985). Catullus and His World: A Reappraisal. Cambridge University Press. ISBN 0521266068.
- Wiseman, T. (2022). Catullan Questions Revisited. Cambridge University Press. ISBN 9781009235761.
- Wiseman, T. (1974). 'Cinna the Poet' and Other Roman Essays. Leicester University Press. ISBN 0718511204.
- Wiseman, T. (1987). "The Masters of Sirmio". Roman Studies, Literary and Historical. Liverpool and Wolfeboro, New Hampshire: Francis Cairns. pp. 311–372. ISBN 0905205626.
- Ziolkowski, Theodore (2020). Roman Poets in Modern Guise: The Reception of Roman Poetry Since World War I. Camden House Publishing. ISBN 9781787448742.

=== Journals ===
- Braden, Gordon (1979). "'Vivamus, mea Lesbia' in the English Renaissance". English Literary Renaissance. 9 (2). University of Chicago Press: 199–224. JSTOR 43446948.
- Buller, Jeffrey (1994). "Cicero's "Pro Caelio": Text and Context". The Classical Outlook. 71 (4). American Classical League: 121–128. doi:10.2307/43937632. JSTOR 43937632.
- Gräßner, Claudia (2015). "Clodia". Brill's New Pauly – Supplements II. ISSN 2468-3418.
- Harbach, Andrea; Tromp, Ton (2025). "He Says She Says: From Indirect Speech to a Voice of Her Own". Neohelicon. 52: 201–217. doi:10.1007/s11059-025-00800-0.
- Holzberg, Niklas (2013). "Lesbia, the Poet, and the Two Faces of Sappho: 'Womanufacture' in Catullus". Proceedings of the Cambridge Philological Society. Second. 46: 28–44. doi:10.1017/S0068673500002431.
- Inowlocki, Sabrina (2007). "Un trace de Genèse 11:1–9 dans les Fabulae attribuées à Hygin?" [A Trace of Genesis 11:1–19 in the Fabulae Attributed to Hyginus?]. Latomus (in French). 66 (2): 342–349. JSTOR 41545239.
- Leen, Anne (2001). "Clodia Oppugnatrix: The Domus Motif in Cicero's "Pro Caelio"". The Classical Journal. 96 (2). Johns Hopkins University Press: 141–162. doi:10.2307/3298121. JSTOR 3298121.
- Lewis, Maxine (2018). "Anna Jackson's I, Clodia: Catullus, Women's Voices, and Feminist Implications". Classical Receptions Journal. 10 (2). Oxford University Press: 127–148. doi:10.1093/crj/clx018.
- Lindsay, Hugh (2009). "Suetonius's De Poetis: The Project and the Life of Vergil". Classicum. 35 (1): 2–7 – via Academia.edu.
- Rankin, Herbert David (1969). "'Clodia II'". L'Antiquité Classique. 38 (2): 501–506.
- Reekmans, T. (1992). "Verbal Humour in Plutarch and Suetonius' Lives". Ancient Society. 23. Peeters Publishers: 189–232. doi:10.2307/44079481. JSTOR 44079481.
- Rothstein, Max (1923). "Catull und Lesbia" [Catullus and Lesbia]. Philologus (in German). 78: 1–34.
- Wilkinson, L. (1977). "Catullus 11.11–12". Proceedings of the Cambridge Philological Society. 23: 133–134. doi:10.1017/S0068673500003965.
- Wiseman, T. (1975). "Clodia: Some Imaginary Lives". Arion. 2 (1). Boston University: 96–115. doi:10.2307/20163366. JSTOR 20163366.
- Wiseman, T. (1965). "The Last of the Metelli". Latomus. Société d'Études Latines de Bruxelles: 52–61. doi:10.2307/41524440. JSTOR 41524440.
