= A Murder on the Appian Way =

1996 novel by Steven Saylor

- First edition
- Author: Steven Saylor
- Language: English
- Series: Roma Sub Rosa
- Genre: Historical
- Publisher: St. Martin's Press
- Publication date: 1996
- Publication place: United States
- Media type: Print (hardback & paperback)
- Pages: 304 pp
- ISBN: 978-0312143770
- Preceded by: The Venus Throw
- Followed by: The House of the Vestals

A Murder on the Appian Way is a historical novel by American author Steven Saylor, first published by St. Martin's Press in 1996. It is the fifth book in his Roma Sub Rosa series of mystery novels set in the final decades of the Roman Republic. The main character is the Roman sleuth Gordianus the Finder.

== Plot summary ==
The year is 52 BC. Awoken to the sound of chaos in the streets, Gordianus soon learns the cause: the murder of Clodius. Clodius' sister, Clodia, reveals that he was struck down on the Appian Way, in a skirmish against his longtime rival, Milo. Upon looking at the mangled corpse of Clodius and hearing his widow Fulvia's cry, the mourning mob lead his funeral bier into the very heart of the Senate House before lighting it on fire.

Soon after, Gordianus is visited by Tiro, Cicero's freedman and secretary, on behalf of the great orator. Following Tiro to Cicero's home, Gordianus meets the great orator along with Marcus Caelius, and the now infamous Milo.

To defend himself, Milo and Caelius hold a contio in the forum, which devolves into violence once the Clodians attack. Amidst the looting and killing, Gordianus' own house is ransacked leading to Belbo's death.

Eventually, he finds himself summoned by Fulvia, Clodius' widow, who shares her account of her husband's death based on eyewitnesses who escaped the skirmish. Mentioning that Marc Antony approached her, she tasks Gordianus with figuring out if he was involved in Clodius' death. While he mulls over his decision to help her, he is summoned once more to meet someone new—Pompey. Escorted to the Great One's villa outside the city walls, Pompey hires Gordianus to find out the truth behind Clodius' death by heading to the scene of the crime.

The next day, Gordianus heads out with Eco and his bodyguard, Davus. Nearing Bovillae, they encounter an innkeeper, a priest, and a priestess who share their accounts of the skirmish between Milo's men and Clodius'. It is revealed that Milo's gladiators have captured five prisoners. On the advice of the priestess, the trio head to the House of the Vestals on Mount Alba nearby to speak with the Virgo Maxima who reveals that a disguised woman came and made an offering of thanks for Clodius' death. For the offering, she produced Clodius' gold signet ring, which the Virgo Maxima refused. After a night in Pompey's villa, the three head over to Clodius' unfinished villa before visiting Senator Tedius, who found his corpse.

After several more days at Pompey's villa, the trio are ambushed on their way back to Rome. Leaving Davus for dead, the kidnappers hold Gordianus and Eco for roughly 44 days in an unknown location. Gordianus and Eco manage to escape the pit. After wandering the countryside, the pair encounter Cicero in Ariminum. The two agree to accompany Cicero to meet Caesar in Ravenna.

At Caesar's residence, Gordianus and Eco seek out Meto. His second son hands Gordianus a letter from Diana which reveals that Bethesda received an anonymous letter reassuring her that Gordianus and Eco are safe and will be released in due time. The next day, Meto arranges for an audience with Caesar, who remembers Gordianus. Later that evening, Gordianus is reintroduced to Marc Antony, who agrees to escort him and Eco back to Rome.

Upon their return, they are greeted joyously by their family and are surprised to see Davus alive and well. After a blissful night, Gordianus and Eco are summoned by Pompey, now sole consul, again. Reporting on their findings, Pompey thanks them and agrees to continue protecting them in the meantime.

Following a few days of quiet, Clodia calls upon Gordianus. Gordianus resists his desire for her and instead promises to share his discoveries with her following his meeting with Fulvia. He is reintroduced to Fulvia's mother, Sempronia, and finds the priest and priestess, Felix and Felicia, respectively present. As part of his payment, he requests ownership of the two stable boys he met at Clodius' villa, who saved their master's son. After Fulvia agrees, Gordianus reports that Marc Antony had nothing to do with Clodius' death. Tearfully relieved, Fulvia reveals her plans to marry Marc Antony's boyhood friend, Curio. Collecting his payment, he leaves, only to find Clodia gone.

A few days later, Eco insists that Gordianus attend the latest contio, where the mysterious prisoners of Milo's publicly testify after escaping his villa where they were imprisoned for two months. Following their testimony, Appius Claudius, Clodius' nephew, formally brings charges against Milo.

On the first day of the trial, the mob rushes at Marcellus, working with Cicero to defend Milo, ending the first day prematurely. Unsurprisingly, bystanders and participants enter the trial the next day to the presence of Pompey's soldiers. The night before the final day, Gordianus realizes that Cicero was involved in his abduction and goes to confront him. Cicero defends his actions, stating that he convinced Milo to kidnap Gordianus and his son rather than killing them—therefore saving their lives. Admitting that he wrote the note to Bethesda, out of fondness for Gordianus, Cicero nonetheless stands by his actions to protect the republic. Disgusted, Gordianus leaves.

Despite Cicero's defense, Milo is found guilty and forced into exile. Once home, Gordianus finds something even more shocking—his daughter, Diana, pregnant with Davus' child. Avoiding this new surprise, Gordianus decides to head back to Mount Alba and collect the two slave boys from Clodius' villa. While there, he stops by Senator Tedius' again only to discover that the senator's daughter was ultimately responsible for Clodius' death, in addition to being the mystery woman who approached the House of the Vestals. Swearing to keep their involvement a secret, the senator and his daughter entrust Clodius' ring to Gordianus.

Upon returning to Rome, Gordianus makes a few stops before returning Clodius' ring to his sister. Before leaving Clodia, he invites her to Diana's wedding.
