= Sextus Roscius =

Roman farmer tried for murder

Sextus Roscius (often referred to as Sextus Roscius the Younger to differentiate him from his father) was a Roman citizen farmer from Ameria (modern day Amelia) during the latter days of the Roman Republic. In 80 BC, he was tried in Rome for patricide, and was successfully defended by the 26-year-old Cicero in the extant Pro Roscio Amerino, Cicero's first major litigation. The case involved some risk for Cicero, since he accused Lucius Cornelius Chrysogonus, a freedman of Sulla, the former dictator of Rome, of corruption and involvement in the crime.

== Sheltered by Caecilia ==
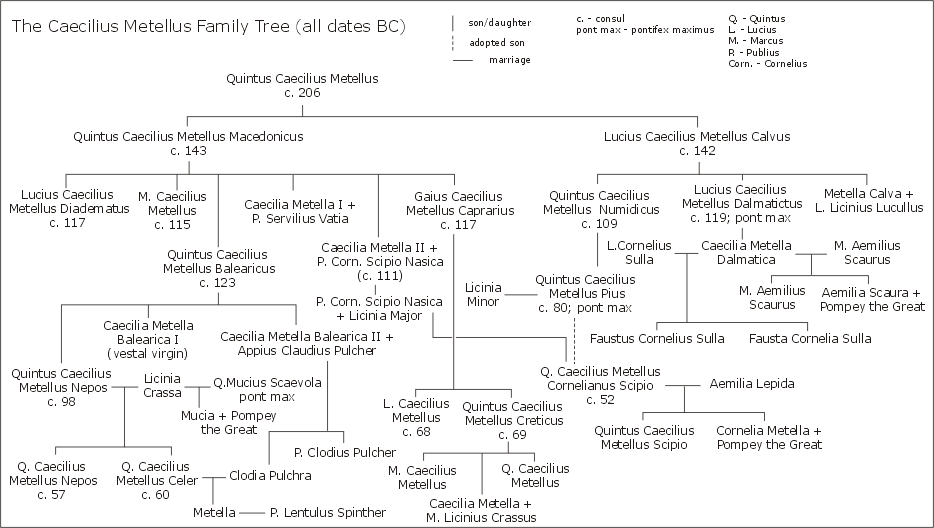
The Family Tree of Caecilia the Priestess

Before the trial, Roscius was sheltered by Caecilia, probably Caecilia Metella Balearica.

== Trial ==
Sextus Roscius was accused of patricide, killing his own father (also called Sextus Roscius), who was murdered in the streets of Rome after a dinner.

Sextus Roscius, like Cicero, was a native of the Roman countryside. He was from Ameria, a municipality in Umbria. When his father was murdered in Rome sometime in late 81 BC, the Roscii family estates were added to the proscription list by Lucius Cornelius Chrysogonus, a powerful freedman of the dictator Sulla. It seems this was done illegally, since the official end-date for the proscriptions (1 June 81 BC) had passed. At the public auction that followed, Chrysogonus bought the family estates, reportedly worth over 6 million sesterces, for a meagre 2,000 sesterces. Soon after (at least according to Cicero) Chrysogonus conspired with two relatives of the deceased, Titus Roscius Capito and Titus Roscius Magnus, to accuse the younger Sextus Roscius of his father's murder.

Erucius, the prosecutor, formed his case around the cui bono principle: since Sextus Roscius stood to profit the most from murdering his father, he must be the most likely candidate, and must have hired someone else "to do the deed for him" (without naming suspects). In his first big trial, Cicero turned the tables, he claimed that the two Amerian relatives, Capito and Magnus, murdered Sextus' father and then conspired with Chrysogonus to acquire the estates illegally through the proscription list. The argument for the defense would likely be considered doubtful by today's standards.

Cicero argued that those who chose to align themselves with Chrysogonus in the belief that they were supporting the nobility were wrong to do so, since his corruption was a stain on the Republic. "For the cause will be rendered more splendid by resisting every worthless man. The worthless favourers of Chrysogonus, who think that his cause and theirs are identical, are injured themselves by separating themselves from such splendor." Eventually, Sextus the younger was acquitted of the murder charges; it is likely that he repossessed his land.

== In popular culture ==
- The trial of Sextus Roscius is depicted in Steven Saylor's first Roma Sub Rosa mystery novel, Roman Blood.
- Colleen McCullough's novel Fortune's Favorites, part of her Masters of Rome series, also dramatizes the trial.
- The trial is dramatized in the BBC documentary series Timewatch in the episode "Murder in Rome" featuring Mark McGann as Sextus Roscius.
- Mauro Martone's supernatural crime novel "The Orcadian File" includes a portal stepping chapter wherein the trial is dramatized.
- Big Finish Productions adapted the trial of Sextus Roscius in Cicero by David Llewellyn. Sextus Roscius is portrayed by Simon Ludders.
