= Wrath of the Furies =

2015 novel by Steven Saylor

- First US edition
- Author: Steven Saylor
- Language: English
- Series: Roma Sub Rosa
- Genre: Historical novel
- Publisher: Minotaur Books (US); Constable Press (UK)
- Publication date: 2015
- Publication place: United States
- Media type: Print (hardback & paperback)
- Pages: 320 pp
- ISBN: 978-1250015983
- Preceded by: Raiders of the Nile

Wrath of the Furies is a novel by American author Steven Saylor, first published by Minotaur Books in 2015. It is the fifteenth book in his Roma Sub Rosa series of mystery stories set in the final decades of the Roman Republic, but the third chronologically. The main character is the Roman sleuth Gordianus the Finder.

== Plot summary ==
It is the year 88 BC. The Roman Republic is under attack on several fronts; while a dangerous rebellion in Italy is being crushed by Sulla, the armies of Mithridates VI are sweeping through Asia Minor.

The young Gordianus is living in Alexandria when he receives a message telling him of the plight of his former mentor Antipater of Sidon at the court of Mithridates in Ephesus. Accompanied by his beautiful slave Bethesda he travels incognito to Ephesus to help Antipater, even though they parted on bad terms, in spite of the great danger that threatens all Roman citizens under the rule of Mithridates.

Together with the Jewish spy Samson, Gordianus must try to stop a ritual sacrifice in the hope of thwarting the King's plans to have all the Romans in the lands under his sway be massacred. Although Gordianus and his co-conspirators foil the ritual sacrifice, they are not able to prevent the massacre, nor do they even warn the Romans of this impending action that has gone down in history as the Asiatic Vespers.

== Reviews ==
Wrath of the Furies was reviewed by Robert Bianco for USA Today.
