= Caecilia Metella (daughter of Balearicus) =

Mother of Roman Tribune Clodius Pulcher

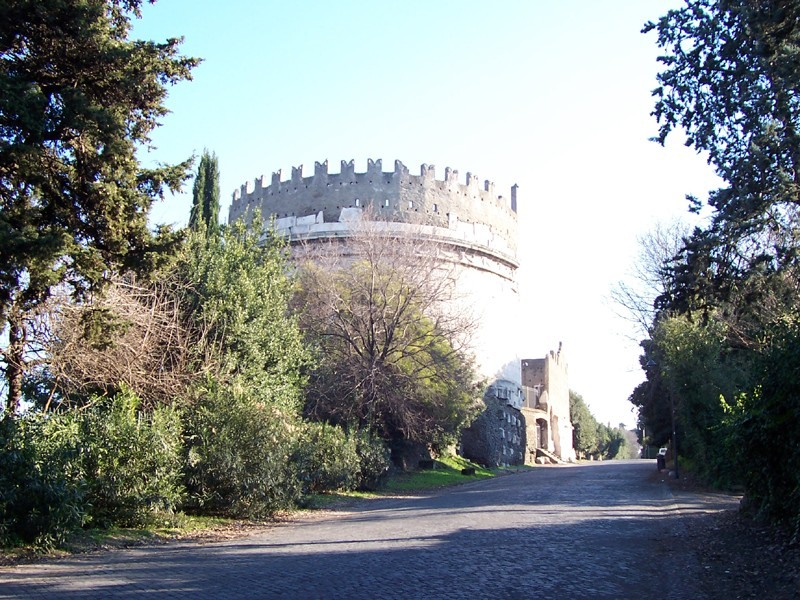
Roma - Tomba di Cecilia Metella

Caecilia Metella (fl. 1st century BC) was a Roman matron of the first century BC, who belonged to the powerful family of the Caecilii Metelli. She was possibly the mother of Clodius.

== Personal life ==
Caecilia Metella was the daughter of Quintus Caecilius Metellus Balearicus, consul in 123 BC.

She was possibly married to Appius Claudius Pulcher, a politician of an old, somewhat impoverished, patrician family. As a member of an important family and married into another, Metella would be one of Rome's most esteemed matronas. Pulcher had six known children; three sons, Appius, Gaius and the famous Publius, and three girls; one who married Lucullus, one who married Quintus Marcius Rex, and one (known as Clodia) who married Metellus Celer.

== Protector ==
During Sulla's proscriptions, Metella sheltered Sextus Roscius after his father's murder. Later, Roscius was defended by the young Cicero, helped by Metella's nephews Metellus Celer and Metellus Nepos, in the celebrated speech Pro Roscio Amerino.

== Temple of Juno ==
This woman has been identified with the one who in 90 BC had a dream of Juno Sospita complaining about the neglect of her temple. Metella cleaned out the temple and was credited with saving the cult of Sospita.

== Cultural depictions ==
Author Colleen McCullough included Metella as a character in her novel Fortune's Favourites, a fictionalised account of the demise of Sulla and rise of Julius Caesar. She describes Metella as "an ex-Vestal", a claim for which there is no historical evidence.

== See also ==
- Women in ancient Rome
- Caecilia gens
- Caecilii Metelli family tree
