= Rubicon (novel) =

1999 novel by Steven Saylor

- First edition
- Author: Steven Saylor
- Language: English
- Series: Roma Sub Rosa
- Genre: Historical novel
- Publisher: St. Martin's Press
- Publication date: 1999
- Publication place: United States
- Media type: Print (hardback & paperback)
- Pages: 276 pp
- ISBN: 978-0312205768
- Preceded by: The House of the Vestals
- Followed by: Last Seen in Massilia

Rubicon is a historical novel by American author Steven Saylor, first published by St. Martin's Press in 1999. It is the seventh book in his Roma Sub Rosa series of mystery stories set in the final decades of the Roman Republic. The main character is the Roman sleuth Gordianus the Finder.

== Plot summary ==
The year is 49 BC. Gordianus and his son-in-law, Davus, find Pompey's cousin, Numerius Pompeius, dead in the garden. Before reporting to the Great One, the two inspect the body and find a secret message. With Diana’s help, the two discover a coded message containing a dossier on Gordianus. Soon after, Pompey himself comes to visit. Upon seeing his dead kinsman, Pompey orders Gordianus to solve the murder and takes Davus as collateral.

Soon after, Gordianus pays Cicero, the person Numerius went to see prior to seeing Gordianus, a visit. On his way back, Gordianus encounters traffic thanks to Julius Caesar's impending arrival since crossing the Rubicon.

After a sleepless night, Gordianus awakes to a summon by Numerius' mother, Maecia. Donning his toga, he crosses town to meet the matron who reveals that her son may not have been as loyal to Pompey as one might think. After finding her son with a mysterious box of gold, Maecia shares her belief that Numerius may have been a spy.

Over the next few days, Gordianus' search reaps few rewards until he goes back to the Salacious Tavern—where he first went with the poet Catullus. One of the eunuchs working there reveals that Numerius did frequent the tavern, often meeting with a man named Soscarides.

Days later, Gordianus spies Marcus Tullius Tiro in the crowd—despite reports that he is convalescing in Greece. Trusting his instincts, he goes to Cicero's house and demands to meet with the former slave. Leading Gordianus back to the Salacious Tavern, it is revealed that the Soscarides mentioned earlier is Tiro himself. Gordianus deduces that the dossier on his family came from Cicero. Tiro confides that Numerius had allegedly discovered a plot to murder Caesar—originating from Caesar's own camp.

In the days that follow, Aemilia, daughter of Titus Aemilius, pays Gordianus a visit. She reveals herself as Numerius' secret lover, and tells him of their secret rendezvous. Upon learning the location, Gordianus sets out to explore it. While rummaging through the room, Tiro surprises him. With their search leading to nothing, Tiro convinces Gordianus to accompany him to Formiae and then to Brundisium to meet with Cicero and Pompey, respectively.

Stopping at Cicero's villa in Formiae, Gordianus is surprised to see Lucius Domitius Ahenobarbus, last known to be a captive of Caesar. After a couple days with Cicero, Gordianus and Tiro set out for Brundisium. On the way, the pair are waylaid by Caesar's soldiers. Suspecting them as spies for Pompey, the soldiers bind them. Fortunately for Gordianus, they are led to Marc Antony, who immediately releases them and takes them to Brundisium.

With Tiro disguised as Soscarides, Gordianus prepares to see Caesar—and Meto. Afterwards, Tiro and Gordianus sneak away on a stolen skiff to reach inside the city, barely escaping Caesar's men. Once within the city walls, Gordianus and Tiro seek out Pompey and the finder is finally reunited with his son-in-law. The trio face the siege of Brundisium by Pompey's side.

Convincing Pompey to leave Davus behind in exchange for the name of the murderer, Gordianus follows the Great One aboard his ship. Chased by Caesar's men, Pompey demands that Gordianus tell him the murderer's name, only for the finder to confess that he did it. Gordianus reveals that Numerius had blackmailed him with a document proving an assassination plot against Caesar—with Meto's name on it. Unable to meet Numerius' demands, Gordianus murdered him. Running from an enraged Pompey, Gordianus leaps into the water.

Waking up three days later, he finds himself in a room with Davus who was able to find him after the battle. After a few days of rest, the two head for Rome, trailing after Caesar. Once back home, Gordianus sends a message to Meto asking to meet at the Salacious Tavern. Confronting Meto about the plot, his son does not deny it, and merely says that he cannot say more. He leaves soon after, leaving Gordianus to drink alone. Tipsy, Gordianus realizes where Numerius hid the incriminating documents—right below his seat. Rushing home, Gordianus burns the documents and looks for Meto. While searching, one of Caesar's guards reports that Meto has deserted and fled to Massilia.

Soon after, Gordianus receives a secret message from Meto in which he reveals that the assassination plot was a ploy of Caesar's to plant Meto as a spy. Thanks to Gordianus' confession to Pompey, Meto has now successfully infiltrated enemy lines as a spy in Massilia.

A few days later, Gordianus visits Maecia and is surprised to find Aemilia there. The two reveal that they told everyone that Aemilia and Numerius had been married in secret, thus allowing Aemilia to have her baby.
