= Titus Annius Milo =

Ancient Roman politician and agitator (d. 48 BCE)

- Died: 48 BC; Compsa
- Cause of death: Stone to the head
- Occupation: Statesman
- Known for: Gang violence
- Office: Cursus honorum up to praetor (including tribune of the plebs)
- Political party: Optimates
- Spouse: Fausta Cornelia

Titus Annius Milo (died 48 BC) was a Roman politician and agitator. The son of Gaius Papius Celsus, he was adopted by his maternal grandfather, Titus Annius Luscus. In 52 BC, he was prosecuted for the murder of Publius Clodius Pulcher and exiled from Rome. He was unsuccessfully defended by his friend, Marcus Tullius Cicero, in the speech Pro Milone.

== Career ==
Milo was an ally of Pompey and of the Optimates. He organized bands of armed slaves, hired thugs and gladiators in opposition to Clodius, who supported Pompey's rival, Julius Caesar, and the Populares. The two opposing factions clashed in the streets of Rome between 57 BC and 52 BC.

=== Cursus honorum ===
Milo was tribune of the plebs in 57 BC. He took a prominent role in recalling Cicero from exile after Clodius had arranged for his exile the previous year.

In 56 BC, Milo was charged with illegal violence by Clodius. He was defended by Cicero and Pompey (among others). The trial led to riots between Milo's and Clodius's supporters in the Forum. Pompey's opponents supported Clodius; they wanted to weaken Pompey. Eventually, Milo was acquitted.

On 23 January 57 BC, Clodius tried to use a force of gladiators to block a move to recall Cicero from exile, but Milo arrested Clodius' gladiators. Milo was subsequently attacked by Clodius' gangs. Milo attempted to prosecute Clodius for carrying out this violence but was unsuccessful. Later that year he tried to prosecute Clodius again, but Clodius escaped by being elected aedile in 56 BC and so was immune from prosecution.

Milo became praetor in 54 BC, and in that year, he married Fausta Cornelia, daughter of the dictator Lucius Cornelius Sulla, and the ex-wife of Gaius Memmius.

In 53 BC, Milo made a bid for one of the consulships of the following year (he ran against Quintus Caecilius Metellus Scipio and Publius Plautius Hypsaeus, nominees of Pompey, who were running together) while Clodius was standing for the praetorship. Milo was a strong candidate for he had won popular support through largesse and the promotion of extravagant games, and he enjoyed the support of the Optimates. Pompey, however, gave his support to Milo's opponents. Plautius was an old quaestor of his and Scipio was his father-in-law. Meanwhile, Clodius feared he would achieve little as praetor if Milo were to become consul. Milo's and Clodius's supporters clashed in the streets of Rome leading to a breakdown of order. The elections were declared void because of the excessive use of the tribunes' vetoes which meant that 52 BC began with an interregnum.

=== Death of Clodius ===
On 18 January 52 BC, Milo and Clodius, each with an armed retinue, met on the Appian Way near Bovillae. Milo was on his way to Lanuvium to appoint a priest. Conflicting stories claim that Clodius was either peacefully heading to Rome after receiving news a friend had died or lying in wait for Milo. Whatever the reason, a scuffle led to a fight between the two parties, with Clodius being wounded by one of Milo's men (an ex-gladiator called Birria). Clodius fled to an inn, from which he was extracted on Milo's orders and murdered.

=== Trial ===
The followers of Clodius carried his body to the Senate House, the Curia Hostilia, and set fire to it. Milo returned to Rome and, with the aid of the tribune Marcus Caelius Rufus, he tried to swing popular opinion round to his side again. On 22 January Milo tried to obtain an interview with Pompey at his house on the Pincian, apparently with a positive suggestion to improve the situation by withdrawing his candidature. Pompey refused to even see him. The Senate took action and passed the consultum ultimum (the ultimate decree), urging the interrex, the tribunes and Pompey to take steps to protect the Republic. In the ensuing unrest, the Senate called on Pompey to become sole consul. He levied troops and set about restoring order, partly by force but also by the legal means now at his disposal. He passed a law regarding both electoral bribery and violence and charged Milo under the new law. Pompey's actions may have been designed to placate Clodius's supporters, who would not be soothed even after they had set fire to the Curia. Pompey hand-picked Milo's jury, and the presiding magistrate, Lucius Domitius Ahenobarbus, was Pompey's client.

Milo was defended by Marcus Tullius Cicero, Marcus Caelius Rufus and Marcus Marcellus. Under Pompey's new procedural rules, the trial should have lasted five days, with the summing up for the defence and the verdict on the fifth day. However, on the first day, Gaius Causinius Schola appeared as a witness against Milo and described the deed in such a way as to portray Milo as a cold-blooded murderer. That worked up the Clodian crowd, who, in turn, terrified the advocate on Milo's side, Marcus Marcellus. As he began his questioning of the witnesses, the Clodian crowd drowned out his voice and surrounded him. On subsequent days, Pompey brought in armed men to keep order.

On the final day of the trial, Cicero was to give a closing speech to try to prevent Milo from being condemned. Instead, he broke down after he was intimidated by Pompey's soldiers guarding the court, and did not present the speech effectively; the surviving Pro Milone was written later. Milo was convicted by 38 votes to 13.

== Exile ==
Milo left Rome and went into exile at Massilia (today Marseille). His property was sold by auction. During his absence, Milo was prosecuted and convicted for bribery, unlawful association and violence.

Cassius Dio states that when Cicero had finished writing up his speech, he sent a copy to Milo in exile. Milo wrote back that it was lucky for him that the same speech had not been made in court because otherwise, he would "not now be enjoying the delicious red mullet of Massilia".

== Death ==
In 48 BC, Milo joined Marcus Caelius Rufus in the rebellion against Caesar, but he died at that year's siege of Compsa, near Thurii, in Lucania. He was killed by a stone thrown from the city walls.

== In popular culture ==
Titus Annius Milo appears as a recurring character in John Maddox Roberts' SPQR series of novels. These historical mysteries are presented as memoirs of the fictional Decius Caecilius Metellus the Younger; Milo is a trusted friend of Metellus.

Milo also appears as a character in A Murder on the Appian Way, Last Seen in Massilia and A Mist of Prophecies, in the Roma Sub Rosa series of historical mystery novels by Steven Saylor. Saylor’s fictional hero dislikes Milo.

Milo appears in Conn Iggulden's book The Field of Swords, the third in the series Emperor, as a street gangster who wages a private war with Publius Clodius.

Milo is a character in Colleen McCullough's novel Caesar.

He also appears in the book Street Fighter: Son of Spartacus in a plot to assassinate Julius Caesar.

Milo features prominently in the 2015 novel Dictator by British novelist Robert Harris.
