= The Triumph of Caesar =

2008 novel by Steven Saylor

- First edition (US)
- Author: Steven Saylor
- Language: English language
- Series: Roma Sub Rosa
- Genre: Historical mystery
- Publisher: Minotaur Books (US); Constable Press (UK)
- Publication date: 2008
- Publication place: United States
- Media type: Print (hardback & paperback)
- Pages: 320 pp
- ISBN: 978-0312359836
- Preceded by: A Gladiator Dies Only Once
- Followed by: The Seven Wonders

The Triumph of Caesar is a historical mystery novel by American author Steven Saylor, first published by St. Martin's Press in 2008. It is the twelfth book in his Roma Sub Rosa series of mystery stories set in the final decades of the Roman Republic. The main character is the Roman sleuth Gordianus the Finder.

== Plot summary ==
The year is 46 BC. Having won the civil war, Julius Caesar is now the master of Rome. Gordianus the Finder and his family return home after their recuperative trip to Egypt, and are given grim news: Gordianus's friend, Hieronymus (whom Gordianus rescued from human sacrifice in Last Seen in Massilia) has been murdered. Caesar's wife, Calpurnia, who has become more superstitious and paranoid with each passing day, believes there is a plot to kill her husband. In Gordianus's absence, she hired Hieronymus to investigate, and now his murder seems to lend credence to the threat. Calpurnia is frantic, since her information indicates that the prospective assassin plans for Caesar to be dead by the end of his great triumph.

As each day of the triumph goes by, Gordianus has no better plan than to follow in Hieronymus's footsteps, interviewing everyone he spoke with in the last days of his life. As he does so, Gordianus becomes conscious of just how many people have reason to want Caesar dead:

- Mark Antony: once Caesar's right-hand man in the Gallic Wars, Antony has been demoted, and placed under virtual house arrest after some of his questionable actions as prefect of Rome in Caesar's absence
- Cicero: the last of Caesar's political enemies from the Roman Senate, Cicero has been humiliated by Caesar in both politics and war
- Cleopatra: Queen of Egypt and Caesar's lover, trying to legitimize their son Caesarion's status as Caesar's heir, and frustrated at his refusal to publicly acclaim the child as such
- Vercingetorix and Arsinoe IV: the former leader of the Gauls and Cleopatra's sister, respectively, both scheduled to be publicly executed during the triumph

While all of these people seem to have the motive for plotting against Caesar, few seem to have the inclination (for instance, Antony seems more interested in spending his days in debauchery, and Cicero is slavishly devoted to his new young wife, Publilia) and those that do (such as Vercingetorix and Arsinoe) seem to lack opportunity.

During the triumph, Gordianus and his family happen to be in the crowd when a call by his simple-minded ward, Rupa, to spare Arsinoe's life, is taken up by the crowd, and moves Caesar to grant her pardon. No similar occurrence saves Vercingetorix, who is strangled in the Tullianum.

The last day of the triumph arrives, and Gordianus is hopeful that nothing will happen, though he is still nagged by the mystery of Hieronymus's death. In the afternoon, he and his family happen to be attending a ceremony at a temple where Caesar is formally inaugurating his new calendar. For a moment, Gordianus hallucinates that he sees Hieronymus's ghost in front of him, telling him he has arrived at the root of the plot against Caesar.

Suddenly, Gordianus realizes who the plotter is: Calpurnia's uncle Gnaeus Calpurnius, a descendant of King Numa Pompilius, and the high priest of the deified King's cult. King Numa gave the Roman people the calendar they are using now, and Gnaeus Calpurnius considers Caesar's replacement of it an unforgivable sacrilege. Just as he realizes this, Gordianus tackles Gnaeus Calpurnius shortly before he stabs Caesar in the back on the altar. Caesar remains oblivious to how close he came to death, and appears annoyed at Gordianus for disrupting the ceremony.

In the aftermath of the Triumph, Gnaeus Calpurnius is discreetly abducted and executed. When Gordianus reports to Calpurnia, he notices that her anxiety and paranoia have not been assuaged by his success at uncovering the plot; if anything, she seems even more convinced that Caesar will be dead before long. Gordianus, having seen how many enemies Caesar has made in his career, privately redoubles his resolve to distance himself and his family from Caesar as much as possible.

== Themes ==
The novel creates an ironic juxtaposition of Caesar's accomplishments. While interviewing the various suspects, Gordianus reflects how many people Caesar has killed during his campaigns as a general, how many bitter political enemies he has made, and how many people are opposed to him as a dictator. By contrast, Gnaeus Calpurnius's motive - resentment over the replacement of the ancient Roman calendar - seems to Gordianus a lunatic and nonsensical reason to commit murder. Yet, historically speaking, the Julian Calendar is arguably Caesar's widest and most-lasting accomplishment, far more significant than his military or political campaigns.

== See also ==
- The Year of Confusion by John Maddox Roberts
