= A Gladiator Dies Only Once =

Collection of short stories by Steven Saylor

- First edition
- Author: Steven Saylor
- Language: English
- Series: Roma Sub Rosa
- Genre: Historical novel
- Published: 2005 (St. Martin's Press)
- Publication place: United States
- Media type: Print (hardback & paperback)
- Pages: 288 pp
- ISBN: 978-0312357443
- Preceded by: The Judgment of Caesar
- Followed by: The Triumph of Caesar

A Gladiator Dies Only Once is a collection of short stories by American author Steven Saylor, first published by St. Martin's Press in 2005. It is the eleventh book in his Roma Sub Rosa series of mystery stories set in the final decades of the Roman Republic. The main character is the Roman sleuth Gordianus the Finder.

== Plot summary ==
In this second collection of short stories from the life of Gordianus the Finder, the reader gets more glimpses into the backstory of the protagonist, as well as meetings with famous historical characters such as Quintus Sertorius and Lucullus.

=== The Consul's Wife ===
(Set in 77 BC.)
Gordianus is hired by the consul Decimus Junius Brutus, who fears that his wife Sempronia is plotting with her lover to have him killed.

=== If a Cyclops Could Vanish in the Blink of an Eye ===
(Set in 77 BC.)
Gordianus helps his son Eco find out who stole three clay figurines. At the end it was the cat who had stolen the figures.

=== The White Fawn ===
(Set in the summer and autumn of 76 BC.)
Gordianus travels to Hispania to find a young man who has run away to join the rebel Quintus Sertorius.

=== Something Fishy in Pompeii ===
(Set in 75 BC.)
Gordianus travels to Pompeii to find out who has stolen a recipe for garum from his patron Lucius Claudius.

=== Archimedes' Tomb ===
(Set in 75 BC.)
Gordianus is in Syracuse, where he searches for the lost tomb of Archimedes.

=== Death by Eros ===
(Set in 75 BC.)
Gordianus is in Neapolis, where he tries to solve the murder of a young man.

=== A Gladiator Dies Only Once ===
(Set in the summer and autumn of 73 BC.)
Gordianus is hired by a beautiful Nubian woman to find a dead gladiator.

=== Poppy and the Poisoned Cake ===
(Set in 70 BC.)
Gordianus is hired by an aristocrat who believes that his cake has been poisoned.

=== The Cherries of Lucullus ===
(Set in the spring of 64 BC).
Gordianus is hired by the paranoid general Lucullus to discover a plot against his life.

== Reception ==
In a starred review for Booklist, Connie Fletcher described the short stories as "marvelous reflections of ancient Rome" and praised the puzzle in each story. A reviewer for Publishers Weekly wrote that the characters were realistic and favorably compared it to Saylor's historical novels. Kirkus Reviews criticized it for lack of mystery, but wrote that the stories "engagingly evoke the last days of the Roman Republic". Alice Logsdon, writing for the Historical Novel Society, commented that the stories were easy to read and had "clever dialogue".
