= Lucius Cornelius Chrysogonus =

Greek freedman (died after 80 BC)

Lucius Cornelius Chrysogonus (died after 80 BC) was a Greek freedman of Lucius Cornelius Sulla whom Sulla put in charge of the proscriptions of 82 BC. He purchased the property of the proscribed Sextus Roscius Amerinus, worth 250 talents (the equivalent of 2,500,000 denarii), for only 2,000 denarii. Chrysogonus then accused Roscius's son, Sextus Roscius, of murdering his own father. In 80 BC Chrysogonus was in turn accused of corruption by Marcus Tullius Cicero, who successfully defended Sextus Roscius during his trial. Very little is known of Chrysogonus after the trial, but it is frequently (although poorly supported in the sources) suggested that he was executed before Sulla’s resignation in 80 BC.

== In popular culture ==
- Chrysogonus appears in Steven Saylor's first Roma Sub Rosa mystery novel, Roman Blood.
- Chrysogonus appears in Colleen McCullough's Masters of Rome series, most notably in The Grass Crown and Fortune's Favourites.
- Chrysogonus appears in "Murder in Rome", a TV documentary about Cicero's defense of Roscius Junior. Directed by Dave Stewart, 2005 - BBC.

== Sources ==
- Smith, William, A Dictionary of Greek and Roman Biography and Mythology, Vol. I (1880).
