= Roma Sub Rosa =

Series of historical mystery novels by Steven Saylor

- A paperback version of the first book in the series, Roman Blood
- Author: Steven Saylor
- Language: English
- Genre: Detective, historical fiction
- Publisher: St. Martin's Press, Minotaur Books
- Publication date: 1991
- Publication place: United States
- Media type: Print (hardback & paperback) and audiobook

Roma Sub Rosa is a series of historical mystery novels by Steven Saylor set in ancient Rome and populated by famous historic Roman citizens. The phrase "Roma Sub Rosa" means, in Latin, "Rome under the rose." If a matter was sub rosa, "under the rose," it meant that the matter was confidential.

The detective is known as Gordianus the Finder, and he mixes with non-fictional citizens of the Republic including Sulla, Cicero, Marcus Crassus, Catilina, Catullus, Pompey, Julius Caesar, and Mark Antony.

== Characters ==
The family of Gordianus grows through the series to become "a typically Roman extended family":

- Gordianus the Finder, the titular character and narrator. A plebeian hired to investigate on behalf of a wide range of clients. In Catilina's Riddle he is called the "most honest man in Rome" by Cicero. Thanks to his work, he eventually moves up in the world, even coming to live in an old patrician house on the Palatine. He is 30 years old at the beginning of Roman Blood set in 80 B.C. Marries Bethesda at the end of Arms of Nemesis after freeing her.
- Bethesda, his beautiful Egyptian wife. Originally a slave purchased by Gordianus from a slave market in Alexandria, the two have always had a mutually affectionate relationship. Gordianus later married her after freeing her at the end of Arms of Nemesis. During The Venus Throw, it's revealed that she and her mother had once belonged to Dio. During A Mist of Prophecies, she falls ill with a mysterious malady. In The Judgment of Caesar, Gordianus takes her to Egypt to seek a cure and she is lost in the Nile.
- Eco, his oldest adopted son, was a mute boy when he first appeared as a key player in the book Roman Blood. Gordianus adopted him after his mother abandoned him by the end of the first novel. He recovered his speech in Arms of Nemesis at 18 years old. He followed in his father's footsteps as an investigator and often assists him in cases. Married to Menenia and father of twins, Titus and Titiania. Inherited Gordianus' Subura house in Catilina's Riddle.
- Meto, his second adopted son, was a slave of Crassus until he was freed and adopted by Gordianus at the end of Arms of Nemesis. Becomes a soldier serving under Julius Caesar by the time of The Venus Throw at 22 years old. Takes part in Caesar's crossing of the Rubicon and the battle of Brundisium in Rubicon. Gordianus travels to Massilia in Last Seen in Massilia after receiving a note about Meto's death. By the end of the novel, Gordianus disowns him.
- Rupa, his third adopted son, a mute who first appears in A Mist of Prophecies alongside his sister, Cassandra. Gordianus adopts him at her request. Travels with Gordianus to Egypt in The Judgment of Caesar.
- Gordiana (Diana), his intellectual and headstrong daughter by Bethesda. Born at the end of Arms of Nemesis on the same day they adopted Meto. During The Venus Throw, it's revealed that she is the culprit behind Dio's murder to avenge her mother, despite only being 13. Marries Davus at the end of A Murder on the Appian Way. By the time of Rubicon, she has given birth to Aulus. At the end of the series, it's revealed that Gordanius has dictated all the novels to her.
- Menenia, his plebeian daughter-in-law (Eco's wife) who has twins by the end of Catilina's Riddle.
- Davus, his son-in-law (Diana's husband) a former slave of Pompey's who became Gordianus' slave and bodyguard. First appears in A Murder on the Appian Way. Marries Diana by the end of the novel. Plays a small part in Rubicon and accompanies Gordianus in Last Seen in Massilia.
- Titus and Gordiana (Titiana), twin children of Eco and Menenia, Gordianus' first grandchildren.
- Aulus, his grandson (by Diana). Two years old at the beginning of Rubicon.
- Little Bethesda, his granddaughter (by Diana).

=== Other notable fictional characters ===
- Belbo, Gordianus' slave and bodyguard. Dies in A Murder on the Appian Way during a series of riots incited by the Clodians.
- Lucius Claudius, Gordianus' friend and benefactor who later leaves his farm to Gordianus during Catilina's Riddle.
- Aratus, Gordianus' loyal slave and foreman at his farm in Catilina's Riddle. Inherited from Lucius Claudius.
- Congrio, Gordianus' treacherous slave and cook at his farm in Catilina's Riddle. Inherited from Lucius Claudius who conspired with the lady Claudia.
- Claudia, a cousin of Lucius Claudius who becomes Gordianus' one-time neighbor during his farming days in Catilina's Riddle. A seemingly friendly matron and a member of the Claudii, who befriends Gordianus and his family before her true intentions are revealed.
- Trygonian, a eunuch and priest of Cybele who first appears with Dio at the beginning of The Venus Throw.
- Mopsus and Androcles, brothers and slaves of Clodius who become a part of Gordianus' household by the end of A Murder on the Appian Way. Both play small roles in Rubicon and A Mist of Prophecies. They travel with Gordianus to Egypt in The Judgment of Caesar.
- Hieronymus, a Massilian who rescues Gordianus and Davus in Last Seen in Massilia. At the beginning of the novel, he is due to be sacrificed as a part of the city-state's rites, but heads to Rome at the end. In A Mist of Prophecies, he is shown to be living with Gordianus.
- Cassandra, a seeress whose murder kicks off the events in A Mist of Prophecies. Engaged in an affair with Gordianus, despite being young enough to be his granddaughter, while Bethesda was ill. Revealed to have been a spy for Caesar.

=== Non-fictional characters ===
- Cicero, first appears in Roman Blood as a young advocate embarking on his first case in defense of Sextus Roscius. During Catilina's Riddle, Cicero serves as consul and brings about Catilina's demise to Gordianus' chagrin. The pair also find themselves on opposite sides in The Venus Throw which doesn't stop Cicero from consulting the finder in A Murder on the Appian Way. Plays a small part in Rubicon where he attempts to maintain neutrality. By the time of A Mist of Prophecies, he is revealed to have joined Pompey in Greece.
- Tiro, first appears as Cicero's slave in Roman Blood where he serves as a key player. Becomes a freedman before the events of A Murder on the Appian Way who continues to serve as Cicero's right hand. Known for coming up with a shorthand transcription for dictation. Plays a large role in Rubicon and goes with Pompey to Greece at the end.
- Terentia, Cicero's wife who plays a bigger role in A Mist of Prophecies. Mother to Tullia and Marcus.
- Fabia, a Vestal Virgin once accused of breaking her vow with Catilina until Gordianus proves her innocence. Sister of Terentia.
- Marcus Messalla Rufus, brother-in-law to Sulla through his sister, Valeria Messalla. First appears in Roman Blood as Cicero's pupil. Eventually becomes an augur and serves as a legate of Julius Caesar. Becomes a friend to Gordianus throughout the series.
- Crassus, begrudgingly hires Gordianus to solve his cousin's murder in Arms of Nemesis. Dies before the events of A Murder on the Appian Way during his Parthian Campaign leading to the disintegration of the triumvirate.
- Marcus Mummius, originally a legate of Crassus who first appears in Arms of Nemesis. At the end of the book he rescues Meto and gifts him to Gordianus. Goes on to serve Pompey instead.
- Julius Caesar, makes a brief appearance in Catilina's Riddle. Mentioned in The Venus Throw once Meto goes to serve him. In A Murder on the Appian Way, it's revealed that the original triumvirate is disintegrating following the death of his daughter Julia, wife of Pompey, and Crassus'. The beginning of his civil war drives much of the plot of Rubicon. Triumphs against Pompey during the events of A Mist of Prophecies.
- Calpurnia, Caesar's third wife. Known to be a model Roman matron, she makes her first appearance in A Mist of Prophecies and is revealed to have been behind many of the novel's events.
- Pompey, mentioned throughout the series as a celebrated general and one third of the original triumvirate. Known to have been allied with Ptolemy XII in The Venus Throw, in which he utilized Marcus Caelius to achieve his goals. In A Murder on the Appian Way, he tasks Gordianus with investigating Clodius' murder. Plays a large part in Rubicon and hates Gordianus by the end. Defeated by Caesar in A Mist of Prophecies and flees to Egypt.
- Catilina, a charismatic patrician who appears in Catilina's Riddle and the short story The House of the Vestals.
- Marcus Caelius, first appears in Catilina's Riddle as a protégés of Cicero's posing as one of Catilina's followers. Engaged in an affair with Clodia, portrayed in The Venus Throw, which ended acrimoniously. Accused of murdering Dio and defended by Cicero, his former mentor. Appears in A Murder on the Appian Way back in Cicero's good graces. Dies in A Mist of Prophecies while trying to incite a revolt.
- Clodia, an infamous widow and sister to Clodius who first appears in The Venus Throw. Hires Gordianus in the aforementioned novel to investigate Dio's death. Appears in A Murder on the Appian Way after her brother's death. Renews her affair with Caelius in A Mist of Prophecies prior to his death.
- Clodius, a high-born patrician who disowned his pedigree to become a plebeian. Known as a colorful politician and rabble rouser, he once accused Catilina of seducing a vestal virgin in The House of the Vestals. Rumored to have had an incestueous relationship with all three of his sisters (including Clodia), he becomes a minor player in The Venus Throw following his falling out with Marcus Caelius. His death in A Murder on the Appian Way serves as a focal point of the novel.
- Fulvia, introduced in A Murder on the Appian Way as the headstrong newly widowed wife of Clodius. Hires Gordianus to look into Marc Antony. A fearsome and intelligent woman who goes on to marry Gaius Scribonius Curio and Marc Antony.
- Marc Antony, first introduced in A Murder on the Appian Way. A kinsman of Julius Caesar and a close friend of Clodius. Eventually marries Fulvia. Plays a small role in Rubicon as Caesar's tribune.
- Antonia, Marc Antony's wife and mother to their daughter. Rumored to have had an affair with Dolabella in A Mist of Prophecies.
- Cytheris, a famous actress and well-known lover of Marc Antony. Plays a role in A Mist of Prophecies.
- Milo, a political agitator and rabble rouser known for his longstanding rivalry with Clodius. First mentioned in A Murder on the Appian Way as the prime suspect of Clodius' murder. Defended by his friend Cicero against the charges although ultimately exiled. Revealed to be living in Massilia in Last Seen in Massilia before he escapes exile to cause trouble in A Mist of Prophecies before dying while trying to incite a revolt.
- Fausta, Sulla's daughter and Milo's wife. Infamous for her adultery and estranged from her husband. Commits suicide in A Mist of Prophecies.
- Catullus, introduced in The Venus Throw as the embittered former lover of Clodia, whom he calls Lesbia.
- Dio of Alexandria, an Egyptian philosopher sent by his people as a diplomat to Rome. Knew Gordianius when he was younger in Alexandria before making another appearance in The Venus Throw in which Gordianus investigates his murder.
- Lucius Domitius Ahenobarbus, a senator who briefly appears in The Venus Throw and Rubicon. Dies by the end of A Mist of Prophecies.
- Vitruvius, an engineer of Caesar's first introduced in Rubicon during the siege of Brundisium. Appears in Last Seen in Massilia during the siege of the aforementioned city.
- Gaius Verres, the disgraced former governor of Sicily who fled Rome for Massilia. First seen in Last Seen in Massilia.

== Titles ==
The books are listed below in chronological order. For publication order, see the author's page.

1. The Seven Wonders (2012) — 92-91 BC Chapters I-VI: The young Gordianus travels to see the Wonders of the Ancient World.
2. "Ill Seen in Tyre" (2014), in the cross-genre anthology Rogues, edited by George R. R. Martin and Gardner Dozois, set in circa 91 BC just after Chapter VI of The Seven Wonders
3. Chapters VII-X of The Seven Wonders of the World are entitled, "Styx and Stones, The Return of the Mummy, They Do It With Mirrors, Epilogue in Alexandria." The Seven Wonders is set in circa 90 BC.
4. "The Alexandrian Cat" from The House of the Vestals (1997) set partly in 90 BC.
5. Raiders of the Nile (2014) — 88 BC: The young Gordianus must travel into the Nile Delta to find a gang of bandits.
6. Wrath of the Furies (2015) — 88 BC: Gordianus travels to Ephesus during Mithridates' war against Rome
7. Roman Blood (1991) — 80 BC: Gordianus investigates a murder case for the famous lawyer Cicero.
8. "The Treasure House" from The House of the Vestals (1997) set in Summer 80 BC.
9. "Death Wears A Mask" from The House of the Vestals (1997) set in September 80 BC.
10. "A Will Is A Way" from The House of the Vestals (1997) set in May 78 BC.
11. "The Lemures" from The House of the Vestals (1997) set in October 78 BC.
12. "Little Caesar and the Pirates" from The House of the Vestals (1997) set in Spring and summer 77 BC.
13. "The Consul's Wife" from A Gladiator Dies Only Once (2005) set in 77 BC.
14. "If a Cyclops Could Vanish in the Blink of an Eye" from A Gladiator Dies Only Once (2005) set in 77 BC.
15. "The Disappearance of the Saturnalia Silver" from The House of the Vestals (1997) set in December 77 BC.
16. "King Bee and Honey" from The House of the Vestals (1997) set in April 76 BC.
17. "The White Fawn" from A Gladiator Dies Only Once (1997) set in summer and autumn 76 BC.
18. "Something Fishy in Pompeii" from A Gladiator Dies Only Once (1997) set in 75 BC.
19. "Archimedes' Tomb" from A Gladiator Dies Only Once (1997) set in 75 BC.
20. "Death by Eros" from A Gladiator Dies Only Once (1997) set in 75 BC.
21. "The Alexandrian Cat" from The House of the Vestals (1997) set partly in 74 BC.
22. "The House of the Vestals" (1997) set in Spring 73 BC.
23. "A Gladiator Dies Only Once" (2005) set in summer and autumn 73 BC.
24. Arms of Nemesis (1992) — 72 BC : Gordianus tries to save the lives of 99 slaves, while Spartacus threatens Rome.
25. "Poppy and the Poisoned Cake" from A Gladiator Dies Only Once (2005) set in 70 BC.
26. "The Cherries of Lucullus" from A Gladiator Dies Only Once (2005) set in spring 64 BC.
27. Catilina's Riddle (1993) — 63 BC: Gordianus is embroiled in the Catiline conspiracy.
28. The Venus Throw (1995) — 56 BC: Gordianus tries to discover who murdered an Egyptian diplomat.
29. A Murder on the Appian Way (1996) — 52 BC: Gordianus investigates the death of Publius Clodius Pulcher.
30. Rubicon (1999) — 49 BC: Gordianus investigates a murder close to home as Rome nears civil war.
31. Last Seen in Massilia (2000) — 49 BC: Gordianus looks for his son Meto in the city of Massilia as it is besieged by the army of Caesar.
32. A Mist of Prophecies (2002) — 48 BC: Gordianus searches for the killer of a seeress.
33. The Judgment of Caesar (2004) — 48 BC: Gordianus travels to Egypt in an attempt to find a cure for his wife's illness.
34. The Triumph of Caesar (2008) — 46 BC: Gordianus investigates a conspiracy to murder Caesar.
35. The Throne of Caesar (2018) - 44 BC: the Ides of March and the conclusion of the series.
