= The Judgment of Caesar =

Historical novel by Steven Saylor

- First edition
- Author: Steven Saylor
- Language: English
- Series: Roma Sub Rosa
- Genre: Historical novel
- Publisher: St. Martin's Minotaur
- Publication date: 2004
- Publication place: United States
- Media type: Print (hardback & paperback)
- Pages: 290 pp
- ISBN: 978-0312271190
- Preceded by: A Mist of Prophecies
- Followed by: A Gladiator Dies Only Once

The Judgment of Caesar is a historical novel by American author Steven Saylor, first published by St. Martin's Press in 2004. It is the tenth book in his Roma Sub Rosa series of mystery stories set in the final decades of the Roman Republic. The main character is the Roman sleuth Gordianus the Finder.

== Plot summary ==
The year is 48 BC, and there is civil war in the Roman Empire. Caesar has defeated his rival Pompey at Pharsalos and is pursuing him towards Egypt, where king Ptolemy XIII and his sister and wife Cleopatra are struggling for power. At the same time, Gordianus the Finder is traveling to Egypt with his ailing Egyptian wife, Bethesda.
