= Raiders of the Nile =

2014 novel by Steven Saylor

- First US edition
- Author: Steven Saylor
- Language: English
- Series: Roma Sub Rosa
- Genre: Historical novel
- Publisher: Minotaur Books (US); Constable Press (UK)
- Publication date: 2014
- Publication place: United States
- Media type: Print (hardback & paperback)
- Pages: 352 pp
- ISBN: 978-1-250-01597-6
- Preceded by: The Seven Wonders

Raiders of the Nile is a novel by American author Steven Saylor, first published by Minotaur Books in 2014. It is the fourteenth book in his Roma Sub Rosa series of mystery stories set in the final decades of the Roman Republic, but the second chronologically. The main character is the Roman sleuth Gordianus the Finder.

== Plot summary ==
It is the year 88 BC. The young Gordianus is living in Alexandria with his beloved slave Bethesda. When Bethesda disappears, he learns that she has been kidnapped by bandits, and must set out on a dangerous journey into the Nile Delta, accompanied only by the young slave boy Djet. There he ends up having to join the criminal gang known as The Cuckoo's Nest, led by the young but charismatic Artemon. And must go with them back to Alexandria to help Artemon steal the golden sarcophagus of Alexander the Great while the city is erupting in violence around them.

The story is set against the backdrop of the struggle between the brothers Ptolemy X Alexander and Ptolemy IX Lathyros over the throne of Egypt, as well as the struggle between Rome and Mithridates.

== Critical reception ==
Writing in USA Today, Robert Bianco found the book to be an “exuberantly entertaining prequel” adding that “young or old, Gordianus remains one of modern fiction's most humanely complex detective creations”, and concluding “this is a raid we can all enjoy”.
