= Marilyn B. Skinner =

Professor Emerita of Classics at the University of Arizona

Marilyn B. Skinner is Professor Emerita of Classics at the University of Arizona. Described as "one of the most sophisticated and accomplished classical scholars today", she specialises in ancient sexualities, gender, feminist theory, and classical poetry, particularly from the Roman Republic and Augustan age.

== Career ==
Skinner received her PhD from Stanford University in 1977. Her doctoral thesis was entitled Catullus' Passer: The Arrangement of the Book of Polymetric Poems. This was published as a monograph by Arno Press in 1981. Skinner began her career at Northern Illinois University before moving to the University of Arizona, where she taught from 1991 until her retirement.

Skinner has published widely on Catullus, gender and sexuality in the ancient world. She published the first full-length biography of Clodia Metelli, an aristocratic Roman woman of the ancient family of Claudii who lived in the first century BCE.

== Bibliography ==
- (edited by Marília P. Futre Pinheiro, Marilyn B. Skinner, and Froma I. Zeitlin) Narrating Desire: Eros, Sex, and Gender in the Ancient Novel (Berlin: Walter de Gruyter, 2012)
- Clodia Metelli: The Tribune’s Sister (New York: Oxford University Press, 2011)
- (edited by Ellen Greene and Marilyn B. Skinner) The New Sappho on Old Age: Textual and Philosophical Issues, (Cambridge: Harvard University Press, 2009)
- (edited by Marilyn B. Skinner) A Companion to Catullus (Oxford: Blackwell, 2007)
- Sexuality in Greek and Roman Culture (Oxford: Blackwell, 2005)
- (edited by David Armstrong, Marilyn K. Skinner, Jeffrey Fish, and Patricia A. Johnston) Vergil, Philodemus, and the Augustans (Texas: University of Texas Press, 2004)
- Catullus in Verona: A Reading of the Elegiac Libellus, Poems 65–116 (Ohio: Ohio State University Press, 2003)
- (edited by Marilyn B. Skinner and Judith P. Hallett) Roman Sexualities (Princeton: Princeton University Press, 1997)
- Catullus’ Passer: The Arrangement of the Book of Polymetric Poems (New York: Arno Press, 1981)
