= The Seven Wonders (novel) =

2012 novel by Steven Saylor

- First edition
- Author: Steven Saylor
- Language: English
- Series: Roma Sub Rosa
- Genre: Historical novel
- Publisher: Minotaur Books
- Publication date: 2012
- Publication place: United States
- Media type: Print (hardback & paperback)
- Pages: 336 pp
- ISBN: 978-0312359843
- Preceded by: The Triumph of Caesar
- Followed by: Raiders of the Nile

The Seven Wonders is a historical novel by American author Steven Saylor first published by St. Martin's Press in 2012. It is the thirteenth book in his Roma Sub Rosa series of mystery stories set in the final decades of the Roman Republic, although it is chronologically the first. The novel is made up of a series of connected short stories. The main character is the Roman sleuth Gordianus the Finder.

== Plot summary ==
The year is 92 BC. The young Gordianus is eighteen years old, and has just become a man. Now he sets out on the journey of a lifetime, traveling with his teacher and friend Antipater of Sidon to see the seven wonders of the world. Along the route he gets entangled in several mysteries and murders that he helps solve, while he is starting to suspect that an even more sinister conspiracy is unfolding around him. The backdrop of the novel is the brewing conflict between Rome and Mithridates VI of Pontus.

=== Prelude in Rome: The Dead Man Who Wasn't ===
(March 92 BC)
After Gordianus celebrates his 18th birthday, he leaves Rome to travel to the seven wonders of the ancient world in the company of his tutor, the poet Antipater, who has faked his death with the help of Gordianus' father in order to escape the attentions of the Roman authorities.

=== Something to Do with Diana ===
(April 92 BC)
Gordianus and Antipater visit the Temple of Artemis at Ephesus, where Gordianus investigates the mysterious death of a young girl during a sacred procession honoring the goddess Artemis.

=== The Widows of Halicarnassus ===
(April–August 92 BC)
In Halicarnassus they visit the fabled Mausoleum, and Gordianus gets acquainted with two widows suspected of murdering their husbands.

=== O Tempora! O Mores! Olympiad! ===
(August–September 92 BC)
At Olympia the two watch the 172nd Olympiad, and see the magnificent statue of Zeus. Gordianus must prove the innocence of an athlete suspected of murder.

=== Interlude in Corinth: The Witch's Curse ===
(September 92 BC)
As they travel past the ruins of the city of Corinth, destroyed half a century earlier during the Achaean War, Gordianus and Antipater get involved in the gruesome murder of a group of Roman soldiers and tourists.

=== The Monumental Gaul ===
(Autumn and winter 92 BC)
At the city of Rhodes the pair see the fallen remains of the Colossus, and investigate the destruction of an ancient plaster model of the giant statue.

=== Styx and Stones ===
(Spring 91 BC)
As they visit ancient Babylon and view the massive walls and the famous Hanging Gardens, Gordianus gets caught up in a ghost story that turns into a murder mystery.

=== The Return of the Mummy ===
(June 91 BC)
As they visit the ancient city of Memphis and the Giza Necropolis, Gordianus and Antipater see the largest and oldest of the wonders, the Great Pyramid, and the Finder must solve the Riddle of the Sphinx.

=== They Do It with Mirrors ===
(Summer 91 BC)
In the great metropolis of Alexandria, they visit the Great Lighthouse and the Great Library, and Gordianus begins to suspect that his teacher is involved in a murderous plot.

=== Epilogue in Alexandria: The Eighth Wonder ===
(March 90 BC)
Gordianus decides to stay awhile in Alexandria, where he turns 20 and buys a beautiful slave named Bethesda.
