= Roman Blood =

1991 novel by Steven Saylor

- Author: Steven Saylor
- Language: English
- Series: Roma Sub Rosa
- Genre: Historical novel
- Publisher: St. Martin's Press
- Publication date: 1991
- Publication place: United States
- Media type: Print (hardback & paperback)
- Pages: 357 pp
- ISBN: 978-0312064549
- Followed by: Arms of Nemesis

Roman Blood is a historical novel by American author Steven Saylor, first published by St. Martin's Press in 1991. It is the first book in his Roma Sub Rosa series of mystery novels set in the final decades of the Roman Republic. It is based on the writings of Cicero. The main character is the Roman sleuth Gordianus the Finder.

== Plot summary ==
The year is 80 BC, and the dictator Sulla rules Rome. The young lawyer Cicero is defending Sextus Roscius, a man accused of murdering his own father who now faces the gruesome punishment for patricide. After famed advocate, Hortensius passes on the case, young Cicero hires Gordianus the Finder to discover the truth of the matter. We are introduced to Gordianus' slave, Bethesda, the mute boy Eco, and historical persons such as the plutocrat Marcus Licinius Crassus, the powerful freedman Lucius Cornelius Chrysogonus and Cicero's scribe Marcus Tullius Tiro.
