= Last Seen in Massilia =

2000 historical novel by Steven Saylor

- First edition
- Author: Steven Saylor
- Language: English
- Series: Roma Sub Rosa
- Genre: Historical novel
- Publisher: St. Martin's Press
- Publication date: 2000
- Publication place: United States
- Media type: Print (hardback & paperback)
- Pages: 277 pp
- ISBN: 978-0312209285
- Preceded by: Rubicon
- Followed by: A Mist of Prophecies

Last Seen in Massilia is a historical novel by American author Steven Saylor, first published by St. Martin's Press in 2000. It is the eighth book in his Roma Sub Rosa series of mystery stories set in the final decades of the Roman Republic. The main character is the Roman sleuth Gordianus the Finder.

== Plot summary ==
The year is 49 BC. Gordianus and his son-in-law, Davus, are headed to Massilia where his son, Meto, was last seen. Lost in the woods, the pair stumble upon a small temple where they run into two of Caesar's soldiers and an alleged soothsayer who urges Gordianus to turn back instead of seeking his son. Following the soldiers to Caesar's camp, Gordianus meets Gauis Trebonius, the officer in charge of the siege of Massilia. Gordianus reveals that he received an anonymous message about Meto's death. While sympathizing, Trebonius orders Gordianus to leave for Rome in the morning. Sleepless, Gordianus goes outside only to run into Vitruvius, Caesar's engineer, who expects Massilia to fall the next day.

Thanks to the engineer, Gordianus and Davus disguise themselves as soldiers to enter Massilia through a tunnel. Unfortunately, the squadron faces disaster as the Massilians flood the tunnel, killing all but Gordianus and Davus. Swimming through the tunnel, the pair come face to face with the Massilians. While they argue about whether or not they should kill the pair, Gordianus and Davus are rescued by someone called Scapegoat. Bringing them into his litter, Scapegoat introduces himself as Hieronymus. He goes on to explain the Massilians' ancient tradition of sacrificing a scapegoat by hurling him from the Sacrifice Rock.

While drinking wine on the roof, the trio see a scuffle between a man and a woman on the rock which ends with the woman plunging to her death. The three are divided on whether the woman was pushed or jumped. Before they can come to a consensus, they are interrupted by a group of armed men led by Apollonides, the First Timouchos and the de facto leader of Massilia. Accompanying him is Lucius Domitius Ahenobarbus who recognizes Gordianus immediately. After Apollonides leaves, Ahenobarbus joins the trio for dinner and explains how Meto came to him and Milo. He leads Gordianus and Davus to Milo.

At Milo's house, he reveals how he tricked Meto into thinking he was open to betraying Pompey, leading to Meto openly admitting he was still an agent of Julius Caesar. Unbeknownst to him, Ahenobarbus and a handful of armed men were listening and ambushed him. Upon seeing the men, Meto escaped and jumped into the sea, seemingly to his death.

Blearily, Gordianus spends the following days wallowing in grief until a Gaul merchant named Arausio calls upon him. He reveals that his daughter was the one who they saw fall from the rock and that she suffered from heartbreak by Zeno, Apollonides' son-in-law, who married the deformed Cydimache. Believing that Zeno pushed her, he hires Gordianus to find out the truth.

After the merchant leaves, two Romans named Publicius and Minucius call upon Gordianus. He quickly realizes that they're fawning acolytes of the long dead Catilina. Insisting that Gordianus follow them, the pair lead him to the house of Gaius Verres. While there, the corrupt former governor shows Gordianus and Davus his secret treasure room housing the eagle standard of Gaius Marius, last seen with Catilina. Publicius and Minucius share their intention to hand it over to Caesar and tell Gordianus that Meto was sent here to look for it. Disappointed by the trio, Gordianus and Davus head back to Hieronymus' house but realize they are being followed.

Early the next day, a messenger ship sneaks past Caesar's blockade to Massilia, spreading word that Pompey was sending reinforcements. Taking advantage of the distraction, Gordianus and Davus set out to inspect the Sacrifice Rock. Surprisingly, Hieronymus comes out to join them and spies a small ring on the surface. After watching eighteen Massilian vessels sail out to meet with Pompey's reinforcements, the trio are surprised to see one return not too long after. Badly damaged, no other ships follow but Davus is able to spy the so-called relief fleet—sailing west for Spain. Scrambling down from the rock, the trio are met by a squadron who orders them to follow. Fighting through the mob, they head for Apollonides' house where they are forced to stay. At dinner, Gordianus first lays eyes on Cyndimache and Zeno, noting that the latter is limping. Gordianus corners Zeno and shows him the ring. Gasping with shock the youth draws his dagger but is interrupted by the appearance of Davus.

On their way out the next day, an old slave confirms that Zeno received his wounds on the day they entered the city—not in battle as he told Gordianus. Looking for Arausio's house, Davus and Gordianus manage to shake off their tails on the way. Meeting with Arausio and his wife, they ask the couple about the ring. The pair do not recognize it. While heading back towards Apollonides' house, they notice a giant sinkhole on the spot they first emerged, causing a breach in the walls. Against Zeno's warnings, Apollonides' soldiers burn Trebonius' siegeworks through the breach. Watching late into the night, Gordianus once again tries to confront Zeno with the ring. Urging Gordianus to put it away before Apollonides sees, the First Timouchos spots it regardless and demands to know why Gordianus has his daughter's ring. Promising to explain later, Gordianus requests Apollonides to summon others.

Back at Apollonides' house, Arausio and his wife await in front of Zeno and Cyndimache's quarters. Entering the room, Gordianus prepares to unveil Cyndimache when Rindle suddenly appears behind a curtain. The veiled figure is unveiled to reveal Meto! Apollonides charges Gordanius with finding the truth from Zeno before seeing his son. Zeno tells him how he planned to stop seeing Rindle once he was betrothed to Cyndimache but failed to do so. One day, she followed her husband to his love nest. Upon seeing him with Rindle, she screamed and ran for the Sacrifice Rock, throwing her ring at Zeno once he approached her. After Cyndimache's plunge, Zeno sneaked Rindle into Apollonides' house to masquerade as Cyndimache. Zeno reveals that he first met Meto before the siege. Assuming he was dead following Milo's plot, Zeno was surprised to see an old soothsayer—one of Meto's disguises—hanging about the city. Trying to ingratiate himself into Apollonides' household, Meto agrees to masquerade as Cyndimache while Zeno hopes to get into Caesar's good graces. Near the end of their conversation, Zeno reveals that Cyndimache was pregnant with his child which was why he tried to save her at first but upon seeing her face again, pushed her instead.

Reunited with Meto, his son explains how he escaped Milo's men. A strong swimmer, Meto was able to get in and out of the city this way. Convinced that Milo was the one who wrote to Gordianus, Meto believes that the exiled rabble rouser wanted the finder to prove that Meto was still alive. Expecting Meto to contact Gordianus, Milo's men were the ones tailing him. Angry that Meto didn't contact him, Gordianus almost loses his temper only to be interrupted by Caesar's men breaching the walls.

Kicked out of the room by Apollonides, Gordianus runs into Davus and decides to seek out Hieronymus. Unable to find him, the pair fall asleep in his bed. Waking at dawn, they find the house in disarray following the events of the previous night. Walking the streets, they run into Ahenobarbus. The former general reveals his plans to escape by one of his ships. As they continue walking, Gordianus spies Hieronymus preparing to be sacrificed. Despite the finder's protests, Hieronymus comforts him by saying he is at peace with his decision. Watching the procession end atop the rock, it appears that Hieronymus has second thoughts about jumping. Apollonides steps forward and the two go over the rock together.

Heading back to Apollonides' house, Gordianus goes to Hieronymus' chambers and falls into a dreamless sleep. Upon awakening, Davus and he head for the city's gates. Surrendering, the Massilians open the gate to the Romans. Upon entering, Caesar chastises the Massilians and reveals that the senate in Rome has appointed him as dictator. Despite his chastisement, he announces his intention for clemency, earning cheers from the beleaguered Massilians. Gordianus spots a procession making its way towards Caesar, led by Meto carrying the eagle standard of Marius. Spotting Gordianus, the imperator whispers to Meto who urges the soldiers to let him through. Beaming at his father, Gordianus instead disowns him.

Offered passage back to Rome by Trebonius, Gordianus and Davus find themselves on a ship. To their surprise, they find Hieronymus aboard, who reveals Apollonides' deception. Upon reaching the rock, Hieronymus switches clothes with an unwilling Zeno, who is then pushed over the edge, along with his father-in-law. The former scapegoat receives passage onto the ship, thanks to Meto. Uncertain about the future, the trio look ahead to Rome.
