= Dio of Alexandria =

Ancient Greek Academic Skeptic philosopher

Dio of Alexandria (/ˈdiːoʊ/; Greek: Δίων) was an Academic Skeptic philosopher and a friend of Antiochus of Ascalon who lived in the first century BC. Along with being an Academic Skeptic, Dio was an avid believer in the Greek gods and Titans, specifically worshipping the personification of time, Chronos. He was sent by his fellow citizens as ambassador to Rome, leading a delegation of a hundred citizens, to complain about the conduct of their king, Ptolemy XII Auletes. In Rome in 57 BC he was poisoned by the king's secret agents, and the strongest suspicion of the murder fell upon Marcus Caelius. The defence of Caelius in April 56 BC, the Pro Caelio, is considered one of Cicero's and indeed Rome's greatest orations.

His brother was the wrestler Topsius (Ancient Greek: Τόψιος).
