= Marcus Caelius Rufus =

1st century BCE Roman politician

Marcus Caelius Rufus (died 48 BC) was an orator and politician in the late Roman Republic. He was born into a wealthy equestrian family from Interamnia Praetuttiorum, on the central east coast of Italy. He is best known for his prosecution of Gaius Antonius Hybrida in 59 BC. He was also known for his trial for public violence (de vi publica) in March 56 BC, when Cicero defended him in the extant speech Pro Caelio, and as both recipient and author of some of the best-written letters in the ad Familiares corpus of Cicero's extant correspondence (Book 8). He may be the Rufus named in the poems of Catullus.

== Life and career ==
Pliny the Elder claimed that Marcus Caelius Rufus was born on 28 May 82 BC, but this date would make him too young to hold multiple positions in the Cursus honorum. In his twenties, Caelius became associated with Crassus and Cicero, while he was also briefly connected to Catiline and his conspiracy. Caelius first achieved fame through his successful prosecution in 59 BC of Gaius Antonius Hybrida for corruption. Antonius Hybrida had served as consul with Cicero for the year 63 BC, and his prosecution was a sign of the negative political atmosphere towards Cicero at the time. A year later, in 58 BC, Cicero was exiled, through the efforts of his political enemy Publius Clodius Pulcher. Cicero was recalled from exile in 57 BC with the help of his ally Titus Annius Milo, who was tribune at the time.

Sometime around 57 BC, Caelius and Clodia are believed to have had an affair which ended acrimoniously. In 56 BC, Caelius was prosecuted for vis (violence), specifically for murdering an ambassador. He was successfully defended by Crassus and, more famously, Cicero, whose speech Pro Caelio argued that the prosecutor, Atratinus, was being manipulated by Clodia to get revenge on Caelius for an affair gone wrong.

Caelius was tribune of the plebs in 52 BC and curule aedile in 50 BC. During this period, he wrote a series of witty and informative letters to Cicero, who was serving as proconsul of Cilicia at the time. After much hesitation, Caelius sided with Julius Caesar against Pompey in the civil war, warning Cicero accordingly not to align his fortunes with Pompey: in 48 BC, he was rewarded with the office of praetor peregrinus (“judge of suits involving foreigners”). However, when his proposed program of debt relief was opposed by the Senate and he was suspended from office, he joined in a rebellion against Caesar which was quickly crushed. It was during this rebellion that Caelius was killed.

== In Catullus ==
Caelius may appear in the poetry of Catullus under his cognomen Rufus as well as his nomen Caelius. Rufus in Carmen 69 and 77 is suggested by Riese to be Caelius, but this is rejected by Robinson Ellis. Catullus writes about a former friend named Rufus who betrayed him in an unspecified way, perhaps referring to the affair with Clodia (usually identified with the loved then reviled "Lesbia" of Catullus's poetry), the alleged attempt of Caelius to poison her, or subsequent attacks on her through Cicero (see pro Caelio). Catullus lambasts this Rufus in an epigram that ends:

You ripped it away, alas, alas cruel poison of our life
alas, alas destroyer of our friendship.

In Carmen 58, Catullus seems to expect a sympathetic ear from Caelius as he bewails Lesbia's sexual profligacy. In Carmen 69, Catullus mocks a certain Rufus for his body odour. None of these identifications are conclusive, although the identification in Carmen 58 is more likely than the others.

== In imperial historiography ==
A flamboyant, witty, ambitious and quarrelsome character, Caelius attracted much attention from the minor historian Velleius Paterculus in the following century.

== In popular culture ==
- Marcus Caelius Rufus appears in multiple books in the Steven Saylor's Roma Sub Rosa series of historical novels set during the fall of the Roman Republic.
- Rufus features prominently in the Cicero novels by British novelist Robert Harris.
- Rufus is a main character in the novel Attis by British popular historian Tom Holland.

== Primary source ==
- Cic. Brut. 79.273
- Quint. Inst. VI. 3.69
- Quint. Inst. X. 1. 115
- Quint. Inst. X.2.25
- Tac. Dial. 18, 21, 25
- Pliny, N.H 7.165

== Bibliography ==
=== Ancient Sources ===
- Clark, Albert Curtis (ed.) Oxford Classical Texts, M. Tulli Ciceronis Orationes vol. I (Oxford University Press, 1905)

- pro Sex. Roscio Amerino (pp. 1–58)
- de imperio Cn. Pompei ad Quirites (pp. 59–90)
- pro A. Cluentio (pp. 91–184)
- In L. Catilinam (orationes IV) (pp. 185–242)
-- I. oratio qua L. Catilinam emisit, in Senatu habita
-- II.oratio secunda, habita ad populum
-- III.oratio tertia, habita ad populum
-- IV. oratio quarta, habita in Senatu
- pro L. Murenam (pp. 243–292)
- pro M. Caelio (pp. 293–333)

=== Modern works ===
- Boissier, G: Cicero and his friends : a study of Roman society in the time of Caesar (1897)
- Austin, R G: M. Tulli Ciceronis pro M. Caelio oratio, 3rd edition (Oxford University Press, 1960),

- Introduction with bibliography (i-xxxii)
- Latin text (1-39)
- Commentary (40-143)
- Appendices and Addenda (144-175)
- Indices (176-180)

- Volponi, M: "M. Celio Rufo, ingeniose nequam", MIL 31.3 (1970), 197-280
- Sumner, Graham V: The Orators in Cicero's Brutus: Prosopography and Chronology (Phoenix supplementary volume 11, University of Toronto Press, 1973)
- Alexander, Michael C: Trials in the Late Roman Republic, 149 BC to 50 BC (Phoenix supplementary volume 26, University of Toronto Press, 1990)

== Works cited ==
- Skinner, Maryilyn (2011). Clodia Metelli: The Tribune's Sister. Oxford University Press. ISBN 9780195375008.
