= List of poems by Catullus =

This article lists the poems of Catullus and their various properties.

Catullus' poems can be divided into three groups:

- the polymetrics (poems 1–60)
- the long poems (poems 61–68)
- the epigrams (poems 69–116)

== Historical context ==
Catullus (c. 84 BC – c. 54 BC) lived in the waning days of the Roman Republic, just before the Imperial era that began with Augustus. Catullus is the chief representative of a school of poets known as the poetae novi or neoteroi, both terms meaning "the new poets". Their poems were a bold departure from traditional models, being relatively short and describing everyday occurrences and intense personal feelings; by contrast, traditional poetry was generally large and epic, describing titanic battles among heroes and gods. These avant-garde poets drew inspiration from earlier Greek authors, especially Sappho and Callimachus; Catullus himself used Sapphic meter in two poems, Catullus 11 and 51, the second of which is almost a translation. His poems are written in a variety of meters, with hendecasyllabic verse and elegiac couplets being the most common by far.

Catullus is renowned for his love poems, particularly the 25 poems addressed to a woman named Lesbia, of which Catullus 5 is perhaps the most famous. Scholars generally believe that Lesbia was a pseudonym for Clodia and that the name Lesbia is likely an homage to Sappho, who came from the isle of Lesbos. Catullus is also admired for his elegies, especially Catullus 101 and Catullus 96, for his hymn to his homeland, Sirmio, in Catullus 31, and for his many depictions of everyday life in ancient Rome, such as Catullus 4, Catullus 10, and Catullus 13. Finally, he was well-nigh infamous even in his own time for his fierce, sometimes obscene, invectives against faithless friends (e.g., Catullus 12, Catullus 16, and Catullus 116), faithless lovers (Catullus 8, Catullus 30, Catullus 58, and Catullus 70), corrupt politicians (Catullus 28, Catullus 29), and bad poets (Catullus 14 and Catullus 44).

Catullus was admired in ancient times for his elegantly crafted poems, and inspired many of the next generation of poets, especially Ovid, Tibullus, and Sextus Propertius. Even Virgil and Horace are also known to have adopted some elements of his poetry, although the latter was also critical of his work. Martial seems to be the only later Latin poet to be influenced significantly by Catullus. Catullus is mentioned by a few other Roman scholars, such as Pliny the Younger and Quintilian, and by St. Jerome. Since Catullus' work was not adopted as part of a classical curriculum, it was gradually forgotten over time, although one Bishop Rather of Verona is said to have delighted in reading his poems c. 965 AD. That changed c. 1300 AD, with the discovery of a manuscript that contained 116 poems by Catullus.

== Main list ==
The table below lists all of Catullus' extant poems, with links to the full text, the poetic meter, the number of lines, and other data. The entire table can be sorted according to any column by clicking on the arrows in the topmost cell. The "Type" column is color-coded, with a green font indicating poems for or about friends, a magenta font marking his famous poems about his Lesbia, and a red font indicating invective poems. The "Addressee(s)" column cites the person to whom Catullus addresses the poem, which ranges from friends, enemies, targets of political satire, and even a sparrow.

Poems of Catullus
Poem	Text	First line	Meter	# lines	Type	Themes	Addressee(s)	Reading
1	Latin English	Cui dono lepidum novum libellum?	hendecasyllabic	10	Friends	Gifts to friends, poems	Cornelius Nepos	Catullus 1
2	Latin English	Passer, deliciae meae puellae	hendecasyllabic	10	Lesbia	A young woman and her pet bird	Lesbia's sparrow	Catullus 2a and 2b
2b	Latin English	tam gratum est mihi quam ferunt puellae	hendecasyllabic	3	Lesbia	Atalanta		
3	Latin English	Lugete, o Veneres Cupidinesque	hendecasyllabic	18	Lesbia	Eulogy to the girlfriend's pet bird	Orcus	Catullus 3
4	Latin English	Phaselus ille quem videtis, hospites	iambic trimeter (pure iambic type)	27	Miscellaneous	An old boat, once fast, entering retirement	A little boat	Catullus 4
5	Latin English	Vivamus, mea Lesbia, atque amemus	hendecasyllabic	13	Lesbia	Brief lives and many kisses	Lesbia	Catullus 5
6	Latin English	Flavi, delicias tuas Catullo	hendecasyllabic	17	Friends	Uncovering a friend's love life	Flavius	Catullus 6
7	Latin English	Quaeris quot mihi basiationes	hendecasyllabic	12	Lesbia	Never growing tired of kissing	Lesbia	Catullus 7
8	Latin English	Miser Catulle, desinas ineptire	choliambic	19	Lesbia	Getting over being dumped	Himself	Catullus 8
9	Latin English	Verani, omnibus e meis amicis	hendecasyllabic	11	Friends	A friend's homecoming	Veranius	Catullus 9
10	Latin English	Varus me meus ad suos amores	hendecasyllabic	34	Invective	Caught in a boast	Varus' girlfriend	Catullus 10
11	Latin English	Furi et Aureli, comites Catulli	Sapphic stanza	24	Lesbia	Dumping a promiscuous girlfriend	Furius and Aurelius	Catullus 11
12	Latin English	Marrucine Asini, manu sinistra	hendecasyllabic	17	Invective	Shaming a napkin thief	Asinius Marrucinus	Catullus 12
13	Latin English	Cenabis bene, mi Fabulle, apud me	hendecasyllabic	14	Friends	Partying on a friend's dime	Fabullus	Catullus 13
14	Latin English	Ni te plus oculis meis amarem	hendecasyllabic	23	Invective	Despising pompous poetry	Bad poets	Catullus 14 and 14b
14b	Latin English	Si qui forte mearum ineptiarum	hendecasyllabic	3	Miscellaneous	Risqué poetry	His readers	
15	Latin English	Commendo tibi me ac meos amores	hendecasyllabic	19	Invective	Hands off my boy-toy (cf. 21)	Aurelius	Catullus 15
16	Latin English	Pedicabo ego vos et irrumabo	hendecasyllabic	14	Invective	Nasty reply to critics	Aurelius and Furius	Catullus 16
17	Latin English	O Colonia, quae cupis ponte ludere longo	priapean (= glyconic + pherecratean)	26	Invective	My acquaintance, the utter dunce	Verona	Catullus 17
21	Latin English	Aureli, pater esuritionum	hendecasyllabic	13	Invective	Hands off my boy-toy (cf. 15)	Aurelius	Catullus 21 in Latin and English
22	Latin English	Suffenus iste, Vare, quem probe nosti	choliambic	21	Invective	Everyone deceives themselves	Suffenus	Catullus 22 in Latin and English
23	Latin English	Furi, cui neque servus est neque arca	hendecasyllabic	27	Invective	Nasty insults to whole family	Furius	Catullus 23 in Latin and English
24	Latin English	O qui flosculus es Iuventiorum	hendecasyllabic	10	Invective	Don't give in to his seductions!	Juventius	Catullus 24 in Latin and English
25	Latin English	Cinaede Thalle, mollior cuniculi capillo	iambic tetrameter catalectic	13	Invective	Give me back my stuff, expressed beautifully	Thallus	Catullus 25 in Latin and English
26	Latin English	Furi, villula vestra non ad Austri	hendecasyllabic	5	Invective	Losing the farm to debt	Furius	Catullus 26 in Latin and English
27	Latin English	Minister vetuli puer Falerni	hendecasyllabic	7	Miscellaneous	Out with water, in with wine!	His cupbearer	Catullus 27 in Latin and English
28	Latin English	Pisonis comites, cohors inanis	hendecasyllabic	15	Invective	Screwed over by politicians	Memmius	Catullus 28 in Latin and English
29	Latin English	Quis hoc potest videre, quis potest pati?	iambic trimeter (pure iambic type)	25	Invective	Waste of money by politicians	Mamurra	Catullus 29 in Latin and English
30	Latin English	Alfenus immemor atque unanimis false sodalibus	greater Asclepiadean	12	Invective	Boyfriends can't be trusted (cf. 70)	Alfenus	Catullus 30 in Latin and English
31	Latin English	Paene insularum, Sirmio, insularumque	choliambic	14	Miscellaneous	A hymn to homecoming	Sirmio	Catullus 31 Latine
32	Latin English	Amabo, mea dulcis Ipsitilla	hendecasyllabic	11	Friends	Get ready for me	Ipsitilla	Catullus 32 in Latin and English
33	Latin English	O furum optime balneariorum	hendecasyllabic	8	Invective	Father thief, son gigolo	Vibennius, Sr. and Jr.	Catullus 33 Latin and English
34	Latin English	Dianae sumus in fide	glyconic (3) / pherecratean (1)	24	Miscellaneous	Hymn to Diana	Diana	Catullus 34 Latin and English
35	Latin English	Poetae tenero, meo sodali	hendecasyllabic	18	Friends	Please don't go	His papyrus	Catullus 35 in Latin and English
36	Latin English	Annales Volusi, cacata carta	hendecasyllabic	20	Lesbia	Burning bad poetry to win love	Annals of Volusius	Catullus 36 Latin and English
37	Latin English	Salax taberna, vosque contubernales	choliambic	20	Lesbia	Girlfriend left for richer men	Egnatius	Catullus 37 Latin and English
38	Latin English	Male est, Cornifici, tuo Catullo	hendecasyllabic	8	Friends	Why aren't you comforting me?	Cornificius	Catullus 38 in Latin and English
39	Latin English	Egnatius, quod candidos habet dentes	choliambic	21	Invective	Smiling hypocrite	Egnatius	Catullus 39 in Latin and English
40	Latin English	Quaenam te mala mens, miselle Ravide	hendecasyllabic	8	Invective	Threatening a romantic rival	Ravidus	Catullus 40 Latin and English
41	Latin English	Ameana puella defututa	hendecasyllabic	8	Invective	woman asking for money (political)	Ameana	Catullus 41 Latin and English
42	Latin English	Adeste, hendecasyllabi, quot estis	hendecasyllabic	24	Invective	the effectiveness of politeness	His own verses	Catullus 42 Latin and English
43	Latin English	Salve, nec minimo puella naso	hendecasyllabic	8	Invective	Insulting Mamurra's girlfriend	Ameana	Catullus 43 Latin and English
44	Latin English	O funde noster, seu Sabine seu Tiburs	choliambic	21	Invective	Head colds and cold writing	Publius Sestius	Catullus 44 Latin and English
45	Latin English	Acmen Septimius suos amores	hendecasyllabic	26	Friends	Over-the-top love poem		Catullus 45 in Latin and English
46	Latin English	Iam ver egelidos refert tepores	hendecasyllabic	11	Miscellaneous	the springtime urge to wander	His friends	Catullus 46 in Latin and English
47	Latin English	Porci et Socration, duae sinistrae	hendecasyllabic	7	Invective	unworthy become rich	Porcius and Socration	Catullus 47 in Latin and English
48	Latin English	Mellitos oculos tuos, Iuventi	hendecasyllabic	6	Juventius	Not tiring of kissing	Juventius	Catullus 48 in Latin & English
49	Latin English	Disertissime Romuli nepotum	hendecasyllabic	7	Invective	Praise of a politician-or not	Cicero	Catullus 49 in Latin & English
50	Latin English	Hesterni, Licini, die otiosi	hendecasyllabic	21	Friends	Exchanging poetry between friends	Calvus	Catullus 50 in Latin & English
51	Latin English	Ille mi par esse deo videtur	Sapphic stanza	16	Lesbia	The feeling of love; translation of Sappho	Lesbia	Catullus 51 Latin and English
52	Latin English	Quid est, Catulle? quid moraris emori?	iambic trimeter	4	Invective	Suicidal thoughts at the current political situation	Self	Catullus 52 in Latin & English
53	Latin English	Risi nescio quem modo e corona	hendecasyllabic	5	Invective	The crowd's thoughts on a friend's rhetoric	Calvus, Vatinianus	Catullus 53 in Latin & English
54	Latin English	Othonis caput oppido est pusillum	hendecasyllabic	7	Invective	Direct attack on Julius Caesar's followers	Otho, Libo, Sufficius, and Julius Caesar	
55	Latin English	Oramus, si forte non molestum est	hendecasyllabic (decasyllabic)	33	Friends	Tracking down a lover	Camerius	Catullus 55 in Latin & English
56	Latin English	O rem ridiculam, Cato, et iocosam	hendecasyllabic	7	Friends	Surprise threesome	Cato	
57	Latin English	Pulcre convenit improbis cinaedis	hendecasyllabic	10	Invective	Abominable sodomites	Julius Caesar and Mamurra	Catullus 57 in Latin & English- Pulcre convenit improbis cinaedis
58	Latin English	Caeli, Lesbia nostra, Lesbia illa	hendecasyllabic	5	Lesbia	My (our) ex is a slut now	Caelius	Catullus 58 in Latin & English- Caeli, Lesbia nostra, Lesbia illa
58b	Latin English	Non custos si fingar ille Cretum	hendecasyllabic (decasyllabic)	10	Friends	Tracking down a lover, part II	Camerius	
59	Latin English	Bononiensis Rufa Rufulum fellat	choliambic	5	Invective	Adultery and graverobbing	Rufa and Rufulus	
60	Latin English	Num te leaena montibus Libystinis	choliambic	5	Invective	Hard-hearted benefactor		
61	Latin English	Collis o Heliconii	glyconic (4) / pherecratean (1)	235	Friends	Marriage hymn on occasion of friends' wedding	Junia and Manlius	
62	Latin English	Vesper adest, iuvenes, consurgite: Vesper Olympo	dactylic hexameter (lyric type)	66	Miscellaneous	Girls and boys share views on marriage	Wedding guests	
63	Latin English	Super alta vectus Attis celeri rate maria	galliambic	93	Miscellaneous	Attis, who castrated self to be with Cybele	Attis	Catullus 63 (Attis), Latin recitation
64	Latin English	Peliaco quondam prognatae vertice pinus	dactylic hexameter (epic type)	408	Miscellaneous	Mini-epic about the wedding of Peleus and Thetis	Theseus, Ariadne, Peleus and Thetis	
65	Latin English	Etsi me assiduo confectum cura dolore	elegiac couplets	24	Friends	Writing poetry after his brother's death	Hortalus	
66	Latin English	Omnia qui magni dispexit lumina mundi	elegiac couplets	94	Miscellaneous	translation of Callimachus	Berenice	
67	Latin English	O dulci iucunda viro, iucunda parenti	elegiac couplets	48	Miscellaneous		A door	
68a	Latin English	Quod mihi fortuna casuque oppressus acerbo	elegiac couplets	40	Friends	To Mallius(?)	Mallius(?)	
68b	Latin English	Non possum reticere, deae, qua me Allius in re	elegiac couplets	120	Lesbia	To Allius, with thanks	Allius	
69	Latin English	Noli admirari, quare tibi femina nulla	elegiac couplets	10	Invective	Clean up your act!	Rufus	
70	Latin English	Nulli se dicit mulier mea nubere malle	elegiac couplets	4	Lesbia	Girlfriends can't be trusted (cf. 30)		
71	Latin English	Si cui iure bono sacer alarum obstitit hircus	elegiac couplets	6	Invective	On the contagiousness of gout and stink		
72	Latin English	Dicebas quondam solum te nosse Catullum	elegiac couplets	8	Lesbia		Lesbia	
73	Latin English	Desine de quoquam quicqum bene velle mereri	elegiac couplets	6	Invective	Can't trust anybody		
74	Latin English	Gelius audierat patruum obiurgare solere	elegiac couplets	6	Invective	Poor uncle	Gellius	
75	Latin English	Huc est mens deducta tua mea, Lesbia, culpa	elegiac couplets	4	Lesbia	Helpless in love	Lesbia	
76	Latin English	Siqua recordanti benefacta priora voluptas	elegiac couplets	26	Lesbia	Please just let me get over her	The gods	
77	Latin English	Rufe mihi frustra ac nequiquam credite amice	elegiac couplets	6	Invective	I thought we were friends!	Rufus	
78	Latin English	Gallus habet fratres, quorum est lepidissima coniunx	elegiac couplets	6	Invective	On Gallus's poor desisions	Gallus	
78b	Latin English	sed nunc doleo, quod purae pura puellae	elegiac couplets	4	Invective			
79	Latin English	Lesbius est pulcer. quid ni? quem Lesbia malit	elegiac couplets	4	Lesbia	She loves her brother a little too much	Lesbius	
80	Latin English	Quid dicam, Gelli, quare rosea ista labella	elegiac couplets	8	Invective	Everyone can tell you just sucked him off	Gellius	
81	Latin English	Nemone in tanto potuit populo esse, Iuventi	elegiac couplets	6	Juventius	How could you prefer him to me?	Juventius	
82	Latin English	Quinti, si tibi vis oculos debere Catullum	elegiac couplets	4	Friends		Quintius	
83	Latin English	Lesbia mi praesente viro mala plurima dicit	elegiac couplets	6	Lesbia	She insults me because she still cares	Lesbia's husband	
84	Latin English	Chommoda dicebat, si quando commoda vellet	elegiac couplets	12	Invective	Making fun of pronunciation	Arrius	
85	Latin English	Odi et amo. Quare id faciam, fortasse requiris?	elegiac couplets	2	Lesbia	Inner turmoil		
86	Latin English	Quintia formosa est multis. mihi candida, longa	elegiac couplets	6	Lesbia	What's beauty without charm?		
87	Latin English	Nulla potest mulier tantum se dicere amatam	elegiac couplets	4	Lesbia	Depth of my love	Lesbia	
88	Latin English	Quid facit is, Gelli, qui cum matre atque sorore	elegiac couplets	8	Invective	Incest in the family	Gellius	
89	Latin English	Gellius est tenuis: quid ni? Cui tam bona mater	elegiac couplets	6	Invective	Incest in the family II	Gellius	
90	Latin English	Nascatur magus ex Gelli matrisque nefando	elegiac couplets	6	Invective		Gellius	
91	Latin English	Non ideo, Gelli, sperabam te mihi fidum	elegiac couplets	10	Lesbia	Since she's not your relative, I thought you'd stay away	Gellius	
92	Latin English	Lesbia mi dicit semper male nec tacet umquam	elegiac couplets	4	Lesbia	Lesbia and I are the same		
93	Latin English	Nil nimum studeo, Caesar, tibi velle placere	elegiac couplets	2	Invective	I don't like you	Julius Caesar	
94	Latin English	Mentula moechatur. Moechatur mentula? Certe.	elegiac couplets	2	Miscellaneous		Cock	
95	Latin English	Zmyrna mei Cinnae nonam post denique messem	elegiac couplets	10	Invective		Volusius	
95b	Latin English	Parva mei mihi sint cordi monimenta ...	elegiac couplets	10	Miscellaneous		Antimachus	
96	Latin English	Si quicquam mutis gratum acceptumve sepulcris	elegiac couplets	6	Friends	On the death of Calvus' wife	Calvus	
97	Latin English	Non (ita me di ament) quicquam referre putavi	elegiac couplets	12	Invective	On Aemilius's oral hygiene	Aemilius	
98	Latin English	In te, si in quemquam, dici pote, putide Victi	elegiac couplets	6	Invective		Victius	
99	Latin English	Surripui tibi, dum ludis, mellite Iuventi	elegiac couplets	16	Juventius	Regretting a stolen kiss	Juventius	
100	Latin English	Caelius Aufillenum et Quintius Aufillenam	elegiac couplets	8	Friends		Caelius	
101	Latin English	Multas per gentes et multa per aequora vectus	elegiac couplets	10	Friends	An elegy for a brother	His brother	Catullus 101
102	Latin English	Si quicquam tacito commissum est fido ab amico	elegiac couplets	4	Friends		Cornelius Nepos	
103	Latin English	Aut sodes mihi redde decem sestertiis, Silo	elegiac couplets	4	Invective	Give me back my money	Silo	
104	Latin English	Credis me potuisse meae maledicere vitae	elegiac couplets	4	Lesbia			
105	Latin English	Mentula conatur Pipleium scandere montem	elegiac couplets	2	Miscellaneous		Cock	
106	Latin English	Cum puero bello praeconem qui videt esse	elegiac couplets	2	Miscellaneous			
107	Latin English	Si quicquam cupido optantique optigit umquam	elegiac couplets	8	Lesbia		Lesbia	
108	Latin English	Si, Comini, populi arbitrio tua cana senectus	elegiac couplets	6	Invective	A fitting punishment	Cominius	
109	Latin English	Iucundum, mea vita, mihi proponis amorem	elegiac couplets	6	Lesbia	Lifelong love	Lesbia and the gods	
110	Latin English	Aufillena, bonae semper laudantur amicae	elegiac couplets	8	Invective		Aufillena	
111	Latin English	Aufillena, viro contentam vivere solo	elegiac couplets	4	Invective		Aufillena	
112	Latin English	Multus homo es, Naso, neque tecum multus homo (est quin)	elegiac couplets	2	Invective		Naso	
113	Latin English	Consule Pompeio primum duo, Cinna, solebant	elegiac couplets	4	Invective		Maecilia	
114	Latin English	Firmano saltu non falso Mentula dives	elegiac couplets	6	Miscellaneous		Cock	
115	Latin English	Mentula habet instar triginta iugera prati	elegiac couplets	8	Miscellaneous		Cock	
116	Latin English	Saepe tibi studioso animo venante requirens	elegiac couplets	8	Invective		Gellius	

== Bibliography ==
- Forsyth PY (1986). The Poems of Catullus: A Teaching Text. Lanham, MD: University Press of America. ISBN 978-0-8191-5151-3.
- Green P (2005). The Poems of Catullus: A Bilingual Edition. Berkeley, CA: University of California Press. ISBN 978-0-520-24264-7.
