= English translations of Catullus =

This is an incomplete list of English translations and adaptations of and from the poetry of Catullus.

== 16th century ==
Translator	Poems	Written	Published	Sources	Notes
Philip Sidney	70			Sidney, Philip (1922). Feuillerat, Albert (ed.). The Complete Works of Sir Philip Sidney. Vol. 2. Cambridge: Cambridge University Press. p. 307.	"A metrical experiment and the first Catullus in English".

== 17th century ==
Translator	Poems	Written	Published	Sources	Notes
Walter Raleigh	5			Tomlinson, Charles, ed. (1980). The Oxford Book of Verse in English Translation. Oxford: Oxford University Press. p. 51.	
Ben Jonson	5	in or before 1605		Volpone 3.6 (1607; 1616)	
Ben Jonson	7			The Forest (1616)	
Thomas Campion	5		1601	Campion, Thomas (1601). A Booke of Ayres. London: Peter Short.	
Thomas Campion	13		1613	Campion, Thomas (1613). Two Bookes of Ayres. London: Tho. Snodham.	
Abraham Cowley	45	before 1667	1668	Poole, Adrian; Maule, Jeremy, eds. (1995). The Oxford Book of Classical Verse in Translation. Oxford University Press. pp. 271–2.	
John Dryden	5, 70		1685	Sylvæ: Or, the Second Part of Poetical Miscellanies. London: Jacob Tonson. 1685.	
William Bowles	64		1685	Sylvæ: Or, the Second Part of Poetical Miscellanies. London: Jacob Tonson. 1685.	
John Oldham	7		1684	Oldham, John (1684). The Works of Mr. John Oldham, Together with his Remains. London: Jo. Hindmarsh. pp. 97–98.	
John Chatwin	5	c. 1685		Elliot, Alistair (2003). "Catullus by Several Hands". Translation and Literature. 12 (2): 252–62. JSTOR 40339948.	MS. Rawl. poet. 94, p. 191.

== 18th century ==
Translators	Poems	Written	Published	Sources	Notes
anonymous	almost all		1707	in the anonymous novel The Adventures of Catullus, and History of his Amours With Lesbia. Intermixt With Translations of his Choicest Poems. By Several Hands. Done From the French (London: printed for J. Chantry, 1707), the translation from French of galant novel by Jean de La Chapelle «Amours de Catulle» (1680)	
Jonathan Swift	92	1736	1746	Swift, Jonathan (1937). Williams, Harold (ed.). The Poems of Jonathan Swift. p. 264.	
Nicholas Amhurst	5, 7, 8, 58, 81, 84			Amhurst, Nicholas (1723). Poems on Several Occasions. London: R. Francklin. p. 35.	
Anonymous	4		1717	McPeek, James A. S. (1939). Catullus in Strange and Distant Britain. Harvard Studies in Comparative Literature XV. Cambridge, MA: Harvard University Press. pp. 250–251.	
John Langhorne	5	before 1778	1790	Garrod, H. W., ed. (1912). The Oxford Book of Latin Verse. Oxford: Clarendon Press. pp. 455–456.	
William Wordsworth		c. 1786–7		Tomlinson, Charles, ed. (1980). The Oxford Book of Verse in English Translation. Oxford: Oxford University Press. p. 338.	
John Nott (1751–1825)	complete		1795	Nott, John. The poems of Caius Valerius Catullus, in English verse: with the Latin text revised, and classical notes... 1797 (printed anonymously)	

== 19th century ==
Translators	Poems	Written	Published	Sources	Notes
Walter Savage Landor	2, 5, 7, 39, 61, 75, 85			Wheeler, Stephen, ed. (1935). The Complete Works of Walter Savage Landor. Vol. 15. Chapman and Hall Ltd.Wheeler, Stephen, ed. (1936). The Complete Works of Walter Savage Landor. Vol. 16. Chapman and Hall Ltd.	
Thomas Moore	31			Moore, Thomas (1823). The Works of Thomas Moore. Vol. 8. Paris: Paris. pp. 70–71.	
George Lamb	almost complete		1821	Lamb, George (1821). The Poems of Caius Valerius Catullus. London: John Murray.	
Leigh Hunt	31, 61			Hunt, Leigh (1849). The Poetical Works of Leigh Hunt (New ed.). London: Edward Moxon. pp. 197–198.	
William Ewart Gladstone	51			Lyttelton, Lord; Gladstone, William Ewart (1861). Translations. London: B. Quaritch. pp. 79–81, 102–105.	
Walter K. Kelly	complete		1854	including erotica. In prose.	
James Cranstoun	complete		1867		
Robinson Ellis	almost complete		1871	Ellis, Robinson (1871). The Poems and Fragments of Catullus, Translated in the Metres of the Original. London: Bradbury, Evans, and Co.	
John Hookham Frere	3, 4, 10, 31, 39, 61			Frere, John Hookham (1874). The Works of the Right Honourable John Hookham Frere, in Verse and Prose. Vol. 2. London: Basil Montagu Pickering. pp. 382–397.	
Theodore Martin	almost complete		1874	Martin, Theodore (1875). The Poems of Catullus, Translated into English Verse with an Introduction and Notes (2nd ed.). Edinburgh and London: William Blackwood and Sons.	
Rev. James Davies	complete		1877		
Francis Peacock Simpson	complete		1879		
E. T. Merrill	complete		1893		
Sidney George Owen	complete		1893		
Richard Francis Burton Leonard Charles Smithers	complete		1894	Burton, Richard Francis; Smithers, Leonard C. (1894). The Carmina of Caius Valerius Catullus. London: Printed for the Translators.	
Aubrey Beardsley	101		1896	Beardsley, Aubrey (November 1896). "Catullus. Carmen CI". The Savoy. No. 7. p. 52.	
William Lyman Cowles	complete		1896		
Edward George Harman	complete		1897		
Charles Stuart Calverley	31			Calverley, Charles Stuart (1901). Sendell, Walter J. (ed.). The Complete Works of Charles Stuart Calverley. London: George Bell & Sons. pp. 278–279.	

== 20th century ==
Translators	Poems	Written	Published	Sources	Notes
Walter George Headlam	34		1901	Headlam, Walter George. A Book of Greek Verse. Cambridge: Cambridge University Press. pp. 228–231.	
Thomas Hardy	31			Hardy, Thomas (1923). Collected Poems of Thomas Hardy. London: Macmillan and Co., Limited. p. 166.	
Francis Warre-Cornish	complete		1904, 1913, 1921	Cambridge, 1904. Warre-Cornish, Francis (1921). Catullus, Tibullus, and Pervigilium Veneris. Loeb Classical Library. London: William Heinemann.	
Charles Stuttaford	complete		1912		
Arthur Symons	86		1913	Symons, Arthur (1913). Knave of Hearts. 1894–1908. London: William Heinemann. p. 140.	
G. S. Davies	3			Garrod, H. W., ed. (1912). The Oxford Book of Latin Verse. Oxford: Clarendon Press. pp. 454–455.	
Mary Stewart	complete		1915		
Ruth Sheffield Dement	complete		1915		
Richard F. Burton and Leonard C. Smithers	complete		1928	Capitain Sir Richard F. Burton (metrical) and Leonard C. Smithers (prose, intro and notes)	
F.C.W. Hiley	complete		1929		
Jack Lindsay	complete		1930		
Horace Gregory	complete		1931		
Frank O. Copley	complete		1957	Copley, Frank O. (1957). Gaius Valerius Catullus: The Complete Poetry. Ann Arbor, MI: The University of Michigan Press. LCCN 57010149.	
Charles Hubert Sisson	complete		1966	Sisson, Charles Hubert (1966). Catullus. London: MacGibbon and Kee. ASIN B000PHOUEU.	
Peter Whigham	complete		1969		
Reney Myers and Robert J. Ormsby	complete		1972		
Carl Sesar	complete		1974		
Frederic Raphael, Kenneth McLeish	complete		1978	Raphael, Frederic; McLeish, Kenneth (1978). The Poems of Catullus. London: Jonathan Cape. ISBN 978-0-224-01599-8.	
G. P. Goold	complete		1983		
Charles Martin	complete		1990	Martin, Charles (1990). The Poems of Catullus. Baltimore: Johns Hopkins University Press. ISBN 978-0-8018-3925-2.	
Jacob Rabinowitz	complete		1991		

== 21st century ==
Translators	Poems	Written	Published	Sources	Notes
David Mulroy	complete		2002	Mulroy, David (2002). The Complete Poetry of Catullus. Madison, WI: University of Wisconsin Press. ISBN 978-0-299-17770-6.	
Josephine Balmer	the shorter poems		2004	Balmer, Josephine (2004). Catullus: Poems of Love and Hate. Highgreen, Tarset, Northumberland: Bloodaxe Books. ISBN 978-1-85224-645-7.	
Jeannine Diddle Uzzi and Jeffrey Thomson	complete		2015	annotated Translation	
Daisy Dunn	complete		2016		

== Sources ==
- Tomlinson, Charles, ed. (1980). The Oxford Book of Verse in English Translation. Oxford: Oxford University Press.
- List of full translations of Catullus in English language with links to online texts
