= Catullus 96 =

Poem by 1st-century BC Roman poet Catullus

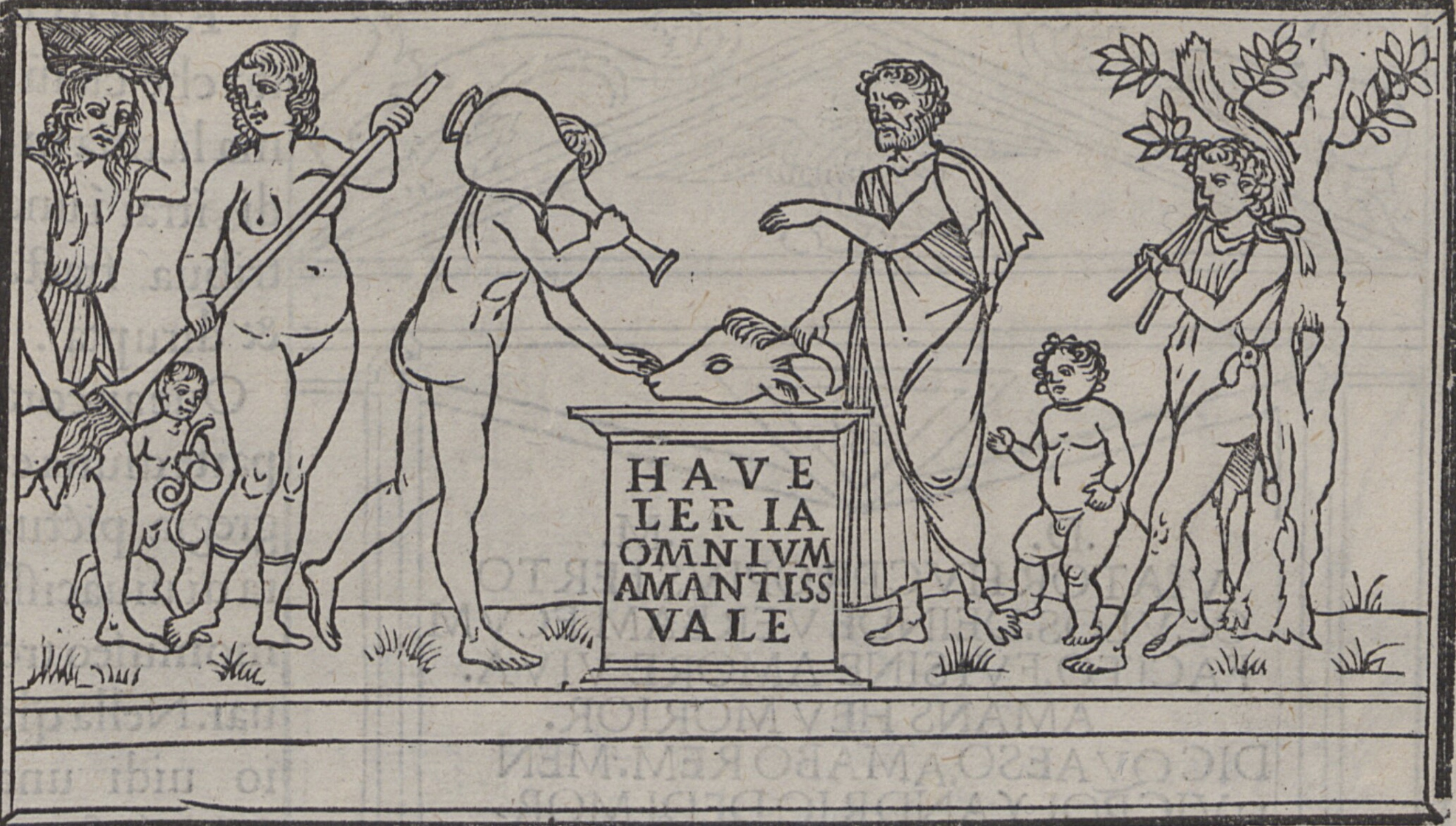
Offerings on a funerary altar to a lost love, Leria, as imagined in the Hypnerotomachia Poliphili, with the Catullan inscription (h)ave [atque] vale

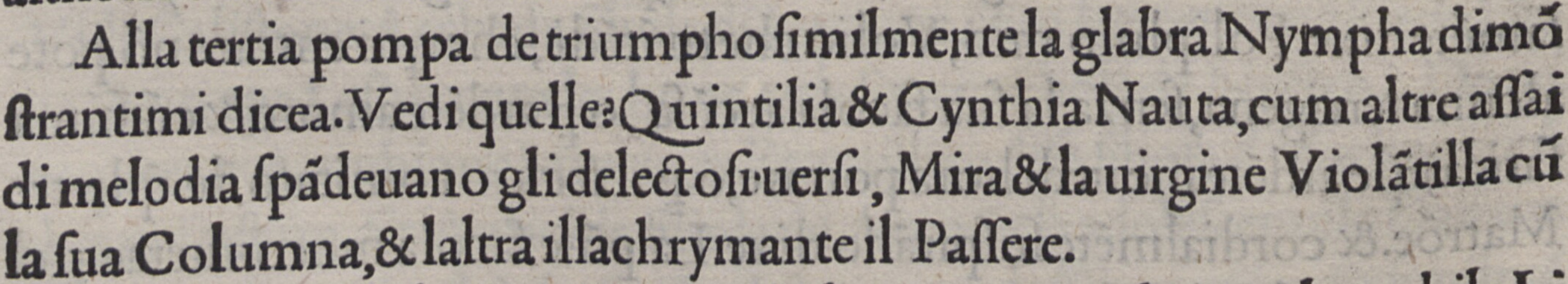
A few lines after the "elegant Parthenopean damsel" Leria is introduced, there is a parade of celebrated love interests, Tibullus' Delia and Nemesis, Corinna, Neaera, the doomed Quintilia, Cynthia (dreamt of by Propertius as drowned at sea), Statius' Violantilla (whose dove dies), and Lesbia (lachrymose for her sparrow) (Note: Propertius Elegies II.26, Statius Silvae I.2, Catullus 3 (the last two paired in Martial Epigrams I.7); there is likely wordplay between columba or "dove" and Columna or Colonna, author of the Hypnerotomachia.)

Catullus 96 is a Latin poem by Roman poet Catullus (c. 84 BC – c. 54 BC) on the death of Quintilia, the wife or mistress of Calvus, a poet and friend of Catullus. The poem serves both as consolatio for his friend and as "literary tribute" to Calvus's own poetic lament, of which two fragments likely survive.

== Text ==
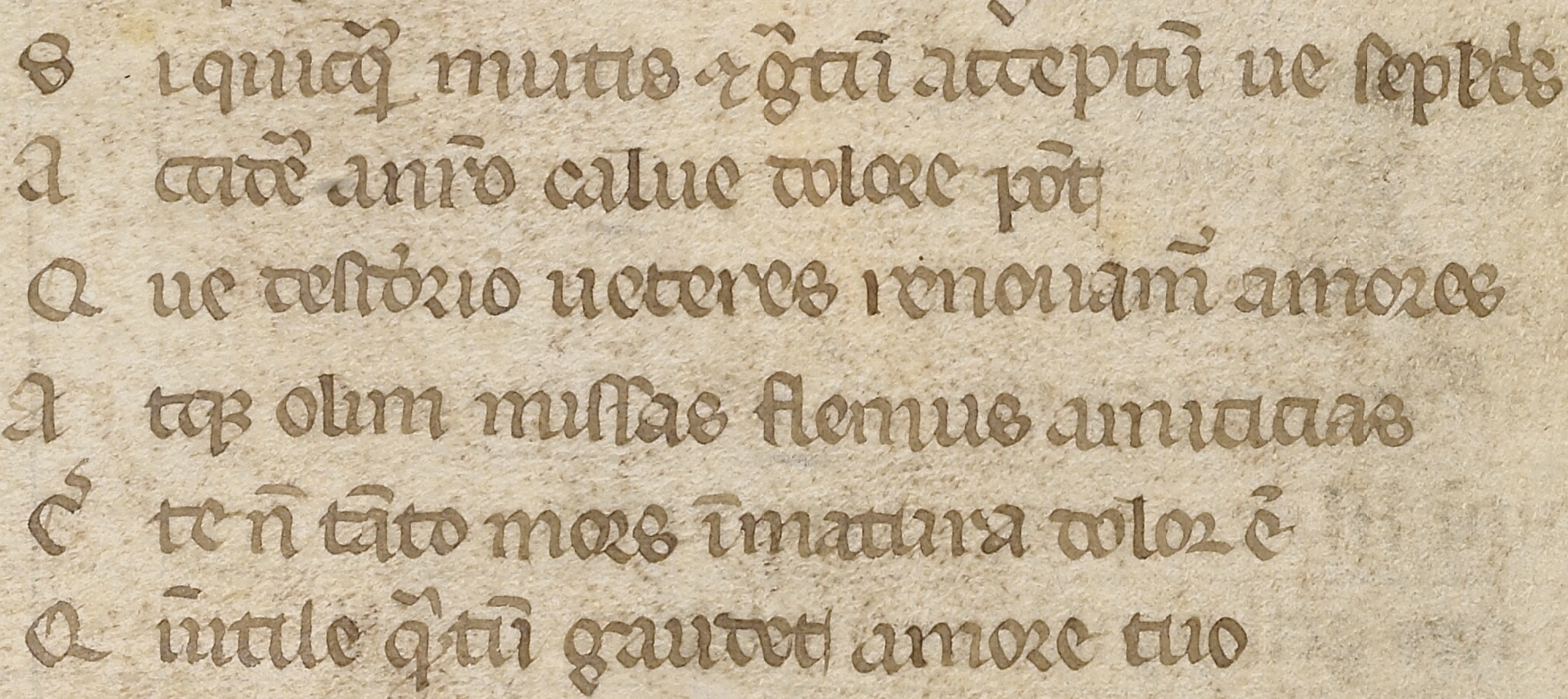
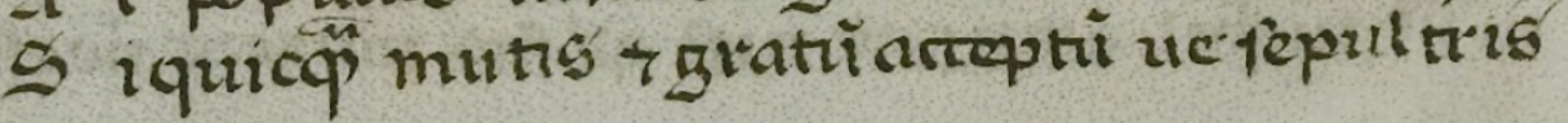
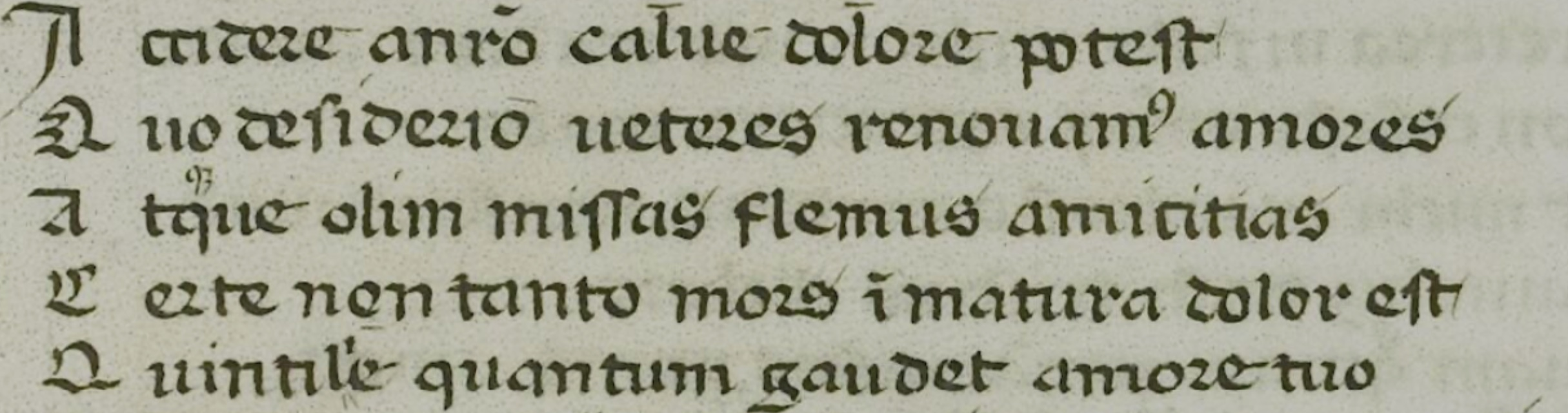

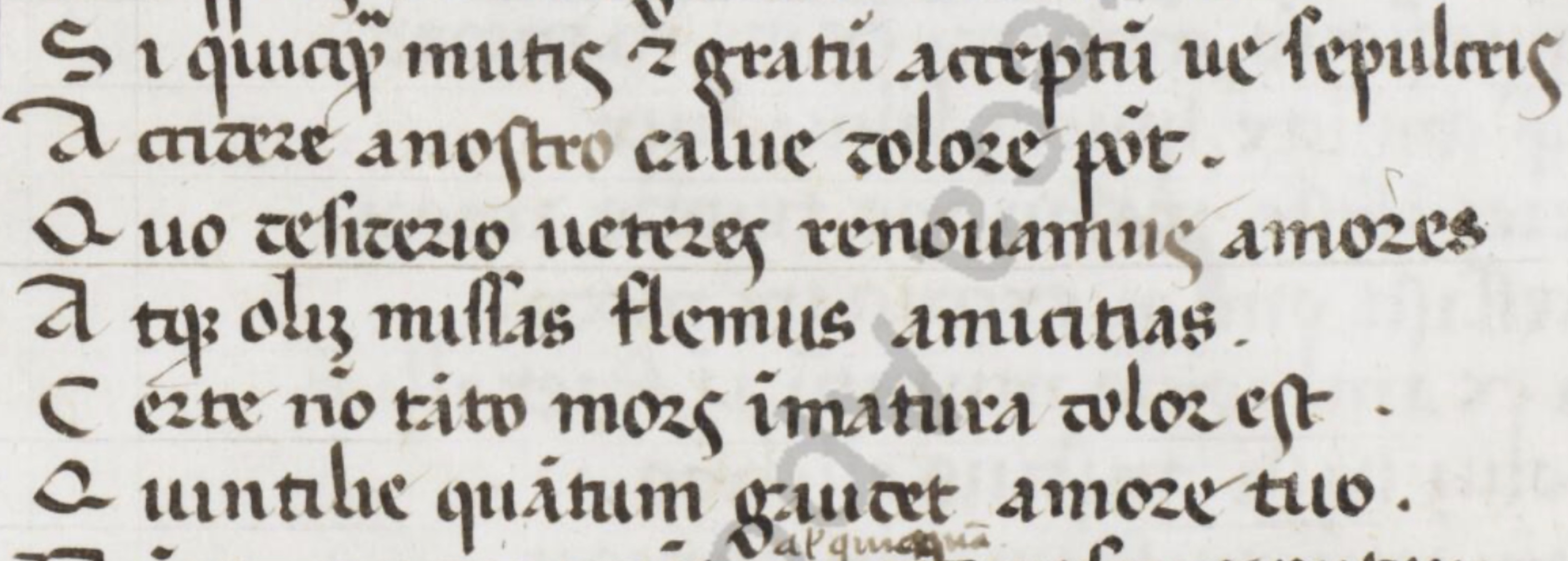
Manuscripts O, G, and R (C14)—there is no visual distinction between the lines of this poem and those immediately before and after

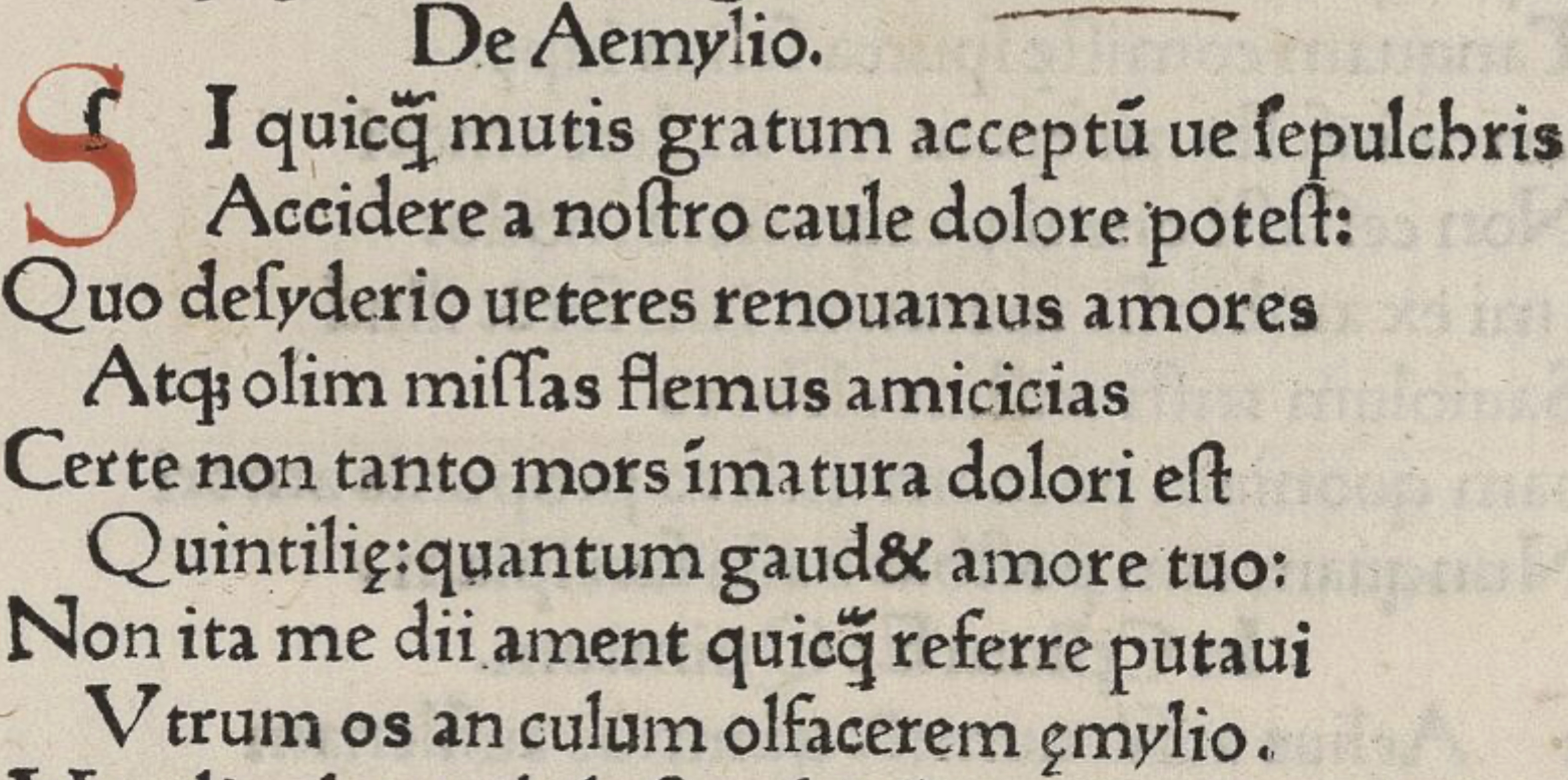
1472 editio princeps—paratextual features of this incunable include the heading ("On Aemilius", the name appearing at the bottom right in what is now line 2 of poem 97) and the guide letter ſ for rubrication

The following Latin text is taken from the 1958 Oxford Classical Text, edited by R. A. B. Mynors. The translation is by John Nott, his 1795 versions being the first unabridged translation of Catullus into English. (Note: A more literal translation might be: "If to silent sepulchres anything gratifying or acceptive / is potent to supervene, Calvus, from our sorrow, / the longing with which we renew old loves / and weep for affections once consigned, / certainly a premature death importeth not such / to Quintilia as she joys in the love that is yours.")

Si quicquam mutis gratum acceptumue sepulcris
accidere a nostro, Calue, dolore potest,
quo desiderio ueteres renouamus amores
atque olim missas flemus amicitias,
certe non tanto mors immatura dolori est
Quintiliae, quantum gaudet amore tuo.

Translation:

If ever to the dumb, sepulchral urn
The tribute of a tear could grateful prove;
What time each recollected scene we mourn,
Each deed of ancient friendship, and of love:
Less sure, fond youth, must thy Quintilia grieve
That she by death's cold hand untimely fell;
Than joys her parted spirit to perceive
How much her Calvus lov'd her, and how well!

The metre is that of elegiac couplets, lines of dactylic hexameter alternating with those of dactylic pentameter.

== Background ==
Fictive literary epitaphs and their poetic form may be approached from the context of surviving epigraphic examples. In the case of Catullus 96, an epicedium or elegy by Calvus on the early death of Quintilia, referred to by Propertius, (Note: Propertius Elegies II.34.87–90 haec quoque lascivi cantarunt scripta Catulli / Lesbia quis ipsa notior est Helena; haec etiam docti confessa est pagina Calvi / cum caneret miserae funera Quintiliae, "these things also the writings of lascivious Catullus did sing, his Lesbia more known than Helen herself; these things too the page of learned Calvus confessed / when he sang the death of poor Quintilia".) and perhaps emulating that of Parthenius for his wife Arete, is likely represented by two surviving poetic fragments. These are preserved in the form of quotations from Calvus by Charisius in discussion of the gender of cinis, "ash", with Nonius also citing the first though with manuscript variants in the person of the verb: (Note: The fragments are numbered 15 and 16 in the editions of Courtney, Morel, and Baehrens, 27 and 28 in that of Hollis. fuero in Charisius, "I shall have become", is in Nonius instead fueris, "you shall have become", or in a variant reading fuerit, "he/she/it will have become; Nonius' fulua, tawny or fulvid, is amended by Müller to furua, swart or almost black. Cf. Ovid Ex Ponto 3.2.28 cum cinis ... factus ero, "when I shall have been made ash"; Persius Satires I.36f. adsensere viri: nunc non cinis ille poetae felix, "men give their approval: will that poet's ash not be happy now".)

cum iam fulua cinis fuero

forsitan hoc etiam gaudeat ipsa cinis

Translation:

when I shall have already become fulvid ash

perhaps her/his very ash may rejoice at this too [or]
perhaps she herself, as ash, may take pleasure likewise in this

As Propertius has the dead Cynthia reproach him for his forgetfulness, (Note: Propertius Elegies IV.7.13ff.) these fragments may be related to Calvus' furta or stolen loves, his affairs with other women, told of by Ovid in his Tristia. (Note: Ovid Tristia II.427–32 sic sua lasciuo cantata est saepe Catullo / femina, cui falsum Lesbia nomen erat; / nec contentus ea, multos uulgauit amores, / in quibus ipse suum fassus adulterium est. / par fuit exigui similisque licentia Calui / detexit uariis qui sua furta modis, "thus was his girl often sung of by lascivious Catullus, she who bore the pseudonym Lesbia; not content with her, he spread many loves, and himself fessed in them his adultery. On a par and alike was the licentiousness of scanty Calvus, who unveiled his sticky-fingerings in varied modes"; Cf. Calvus' "confession" in the passage of Propertius in note 3 above.) In the first fragment in that case we have Quintilia chastising Calvus for his infidelities, 'you'll be sorry when I'm dead and gone', his repentance and regret then providing some comfort in the second.

Of the two figures named in the poem, the poet and orator Gaius Licinius Macer Calvus, who hailed from the ancient Roman Licinian gens, was a friend of Catullus, himself of provincial origins, and as such appears also in Catullus 14 [ru], 50 [it], and 53 [ru]. Quintilia's is a noble name, that of a female member of the patrician gens Quinctilia, though a freedwoman could also have such a name, as was the case with Mark Antony's mistress Volumnia; neoteric poets may have often used a Greek pseudonym for their well-born mistress, as with Catullus' Lesbia (perhaps Clodia), but this practice was not universal. Part of her role in the poem may be to contrast with Lesbia. While it may be gleaned from Diomedes that Calvus was married, whether Quintilia was his wife or his mistress is unknown.

== Structure ==
The poem takes the form of a single periodic sentence, "one intense compassionate breath". Since this is a conditional (if...then..., a hypothetical antecedent (or protasis) followed by the consequent (or apodosis)), Catullus leaves it unclear—and ultimately up to the reader to decide—whether any contact with and consolation of Quintilia is achieved. Comprising three couplets, a "rhetorical syllogism based on uncertain premises", it opens with a "protasis of minimal hypothesis", closing with an "apodosis that affirms certainty". The parenthetical central couplet expands upon the nature of the sorrow, Catullus' own involvement marked by a shift from the singular to the plural, which may also be a generalizing plural of universal experience, before the focus narrows to the particulars of Calvus and Quintilia.

== Commentary ==
While the theme of an untimely death, as ordained by fate or fortune before the limits set by nature, was a concern of classical authors from Homer and Plato to Virgil and Tertullian, the final couplet, grief at one's own death transcended by joy derived from the love of the living, seemingly has no prior parallel. The more conventional doubts in the opening couplet, as to the survival of the soul and the possibility of communion with the dead, culminate in Catullus' poem on the death of his brother in nequiquam, "in vain"; in a poem that purports to console a friend, he cannot be so pessimistic. In the central couplet, Eduard Fraenkel makes the case that the missas affections are not so much a "lost love" as one that has been actively abandoned; the ueteres amores that are renewed, while not inconceivably deep-seated, long-lasting feelings since way back, may more naturally refer to a former relationship that is over. They may alternatively or also refer to the mythological loves to which poets give new life in their retelling, such as that of Ariadne in Catullus 64 and Laodamia in Catullus 68, and perhaps as adduced by Calvus in his poem: Propertius' epithet for Calvus, doctus or "learned", could well apply to one schooled in the mythological literature. (Note: See note 3 above.) Catullus' poem may well be better understood as a literary-critical response to a fellow poet's verse than from a biographical perspective; Quintilia may have died some time before, and compositions by other members of the neoteric literary circle would similarly give rise to Catullus 95 [it] (on Cinna's Zmyrna) and 35 [ru] (on Caecilius' Magna Mater).

== Reception ==
There are thematic and linguistic parallels with Catullus' elegy for Quintilia in Horace Odes I. 24, an epicedium and consolatio, with Virgil the addressee, on the death of a Quintilius [it]. (Note: Horace Odes I.24 begins quis desiderio, "to longing, what ...", the third line of Catullus', quo desiderio, "the longing with which"; Catullus has Quintilia, Horace Quintilius.) The language used to describe Misenus' funeral in Virgil's Aeneid similarly has close parallels with that of Catullus' lament for his brother and echoes also the elegy for Quintilia. (Note: Virgil Aeneid VI.213 flebant et cineri ingrato suprema, "weeping were they and bearing the final gifts to his ash 'that could give no thanks'" (Stephen Harrison's rendering of ingrato), cf. Catullus 96.1 gratum acceptumue, "gratifying or acceptive", 96.4 flemus, "weep", and the cinis, "ash", of the Calvus fragments; VI.223.) In Ovid's lament for Tibullus in the Amores, Catullus and Calvus are imagined as together meeting the dead poet in Elysium, their poetic responses to death in the case of Quintilia making them a "grimly appropriate" pairing. (Note: Ovid Amores III.9.62 cum Caluo, docte Catulle, tuo, "with your Calvus, learned Catullus".)

In a poem supposedly sent by Bohuslaus Lobkowitz von Hassenstein to Bernhard Adelmann von Adelmannsfelden On False Literary Glory, Quintilia appears alongside Paelignian Corinna and Cynthia, from the pages of Calvus-Catullus, Ovid, and Propertius respectively. Tracing the reception of Catullus in Britain, scholar of English J. A. S. McPeek [Wikidata] sees in Shakespeare's Sonnet 30 "not imitation" but "perfect assimilation" of the "chiselled perfection" of the Elegy on Quintilia, George Lamb having observed before him similarities between the two in "idea and expression". Dining together on one occasion, Tennyson quoted the poem to Thackeray as an exemplar of the "perfection in form" and "tenderness" of Catullus, to whom he would return in his Frater Ave atque Vale. In a draft Canto, Ezra Pound included Quintilia alongside Cornelius Gallus' Lycoris; (Note: Ovid Amores I.15.29f. Gallus et Hesperiis et Gallus notus Eois / et sua cum Gallo nota Lycoris erit, "Gallus shall be known in the West and in the East and with Gallus shall be known also his Lycoris".) she may be found instead, alongside Gallus' Lycoris, Varro's Leucadia, and Propertius' Cynthia, in his 1917 Homage to Sextus Propertius, which closes with its "claim to posterity" and "the undying value of love transformed into song":

[sang] Catullus the highly indecorous,
of Lesbia, known above Helen;
And in the dyed pages of Calvus,
Calvus mourning Quintilia

== See also ==
- Catullus 101
