= Catullus 36 =

Poem by Catullus

Catullus 36 in Latin and English

Catullus 36 is a Latin poem of twenty lines in Phalaecean metre by the Roman poet Catullus.

== Text ==
Literal English translation

Annals of Volusius, shitted papyrus,
Fulfill the vow of my girl.
For to the sacred Cupids and Venuses
She promised, if I were reconciled to her
and I stopped brandishing savage iambs,
that she would give the most select writings
of the worst poet to the lame-footed god
to be burned with unlucky firewood.
And in this way she saw that the worst girl
Wished humorously and charmingly to the gods.
Now, you who were born from the blue sea,
who dwell in the sacred Idalium and open Urium,
and in Ancona and reedy Cnidus,
and in Amathus and in Golgi,
and in Dyrrachium, shop of the Adriatic,
record this vow to have been accepted and returned,
if it is not uncharming and unwitty.
But you, meanwhile, go into the fire
full of rusticity and clumsiness,
annals of Volusius, shitted papyrus.

Original Latin

Annālēs Volusī, cacāta carta,
vōtum solvite prō meā puellā.
Nam sanctae Venerī Cupīdinīque
vōvit, sī sibi restitūtus essem
dēsissemque trucēs vibrāre iambōs,
ēlectissima pessimī poētae
scrīpta tardipedī deō datūram
infēlīcibus ūstulanda lignīs.
Et hoc pessima sē puella vidit
iocōsē lepidē vovēre dīvīs.
Nunc, ō caeruleō creāta pontō,
quae sanctum Īdalium Ūriōsque apertōs
quaeque Ancōna Cnidumque harundinōsam
colis, quaeque Amathunta, quaeque Golgōs,
quaeque Durrachium Hadriae tabernam,
acceptum face redditumque vōtum,
sī nōn illepidum neque invenustum est.
At vōs intereā venīte in ignem,
plēnī rūris et īnfacētiārum
annālēs Volusī, cacāta carta.

Line

36.1
36.2
36.3
36.4
36.5
36.6
36.7
36.8
36.9
36.10
36.11
36.12
36.13
36.14
36.15
36.16
36.17
36.18
36.19
36.20

== Analysis ==
Catullus calls upon the Annales Volusi (lit. 'Annals of Volusius') to aid him in the discharge of a vow made by Lesbia, invokes Venus to recognize the payment, and with the word throws the Annals into the fire.

According to E. T. Merrill, the poem was evidently written about 59 or 58 BC, in the short period of reconciliation after the temporary coolness marked by Catullus 8.1ff.

== Sources ==
- Burton, Richard F.; Smithers, Leonard C., eds. (1894). The Carmina of Caius Valerius Catullus. London: Printed for the Translators: for Private Subscribers. pp. 66–68.
- Merrill, Elmer Truesdell, ed. (1893). Catullus (College Series of Latin Authors). Boston, MA: Ginn and Company. pp. 64–66.
- Morgan, M. Gwyn (1980). "Catullus and the "Annales Volusi"". Quaderni Urbinati Di Cultura Classica, 4. pp. 59–67.
