= Elmer Merrill =

Elmer Merrill may refer to:

- Elmer Drew Merrill (1876–1956), American botanist
- Elmer Truesdell Merrill (1860–1936), American Latin scholar
