= Catullus 9 =

Poem by Catullus

Catullus 9 is a poem by the Roman poet Gaius Valerius Catullus (c. 84–c. 54 BCE), written in Phalaecean hendecesyllabic metre.

== Text ==
Original Latin	English Translation
Vērānī, omnibus ē meīs amīcīs antistāns mihi mīlibus trecentīs, vēnistīne domum ad tuōs penātēs frātrēsque ūnanimōs anumque mātrem? Vēnistī. Ō mihi nūntiī beātī! vīsam tē incolumem audiamque Hibērum narrantem loca, facta, nātiōnēs, ut mōs est tuus, applicānsque collum iūcundum ōs oculōsque suāviābor. Ō quantum est hominum beātiōrum, quid mē laetius est beātiusve?	Veranius, preferred by me to three hundred thousand Out of all the number of my friends, have you come home to your own hearth and your affectionate brothers and aged mother? You have indeed. O joyful news to me! I shall look upon you safe returned, and hear you telling of the country, the history, the various tribes of the Iberians, as is your way, and drawing your neck nearer to me I shall kiss your beloved face and eyes. O, of all men more blest, who is more glad, more blest than I?

== Analysis ==
Latin and English readings

Catullus 9

E. T. Merrill calls the poem "an expression of joy" over the return of Veranius, the poet's friend, from Spain. Such expeditions to the colonies on the part of young Romans of that day were common: compare Fabullus in Catullus 28.

In his Victorian translation of Catullus, R. F. Burton titles the poem "To Veranius returned from Travel".

== Sources ==
- Burton, Richard F.; Smithers, Leonard C., eds. (1894). The Carmina of Caius Valerius Catullus. London: Printed for the Translators: for Private Subscribers. pp. 15–16.
- Merrill, Elmer Truesdell, ed. (1893). Catullus (College Series of Latin Authors). Boston, MA: Ginn and Company. pp. xxv, xliii, 19–20.
