= Chatwin =

Chatwin is a surname. Notable people with the surname include:

- Ben Chatwin, English musician
- Bruce Chatwin (1940–1989), English novelist and travel writer
- J. A. Chatwin (1830–1907), English designer and architect
- John Chatwin (c. 1667 – after 1685), English poet
- Justin Chatwin (born 1982), Canadian actor
- P. B. Chatwin (1873–1964), English architect, son of J. A. Chatwin
