= Catullus 42 =

Poem by Catullus

Catullus 42 in Latin and English

Catullus 42 is a Latin poem of twenty-four lines in Phalaecean metre by the Roman poet Catullus.

== Text ==
Literal English Translation

Come, hendecasyllables, as many as you all are
from all sides, however many you all are.
A foul whore thinks that I am a joke,
and denies that she may return to me our
tablets, if you are able to endure that.
Let us follow her and demand back.
Who is she, do you ask? That one, whom you see
with an ugly march, laughing as an annoying mimic,
and with the mouth of a Gallic dog.
Stand around her, and demand back,
"rotten whore, give back my tablets,
give the tablets back, you dirty whore!"
Do you not make an As? O filth, brothel,
or whatever more depraved thing you are able to be.
But nevertheless we must not think this enough.
Because if no other is able let us force a blush
from the wild fast of the dog.
Shout out again with a greater voice,
"rotten whore, give back my tablets,
give the tablets back, you dirty whore!"
But we benefit nothing, she is not moved.
Your reason and method must be changed,
if you are able to benefit more:
"Chaste and approved one, give us back the tablets."

Original Latin

Adeste, hendecasyllabi, quot estis
Omnes undique, quotquot estis omnes.
Iocum me putat esse moecha turpis
Et negat mihi uestra reddituram
Pugillaria, si pati potestis.
Persequamur eam, et reflagitemus.
Quae sit quaeritis? Illa quam uidetis
Turpe incedere, mimice ac moleste
Ridentem catuli ore Gallicani.
Circumsistite eam, et reflagitate:
'Moecha putida, redde codicillos,
Redde, putida moecha, codicillos.'
Non assis facis? o lutum, lupanar,
Aut si perditius potes quid esse.
Sed non est tamen hoc satis putandum.
Quod si non aliud potest, ruborem
Ferreo canis exprimamus ore.
Conclamate iterum altiore uoce
'Moecha putida, redde codicillos,
Redde, putida moecha, codicillos.'
Sed nil proficimus, nihil mouetur.
Mutanda est ratio modusque nobis,
Si quid proficere amplius potestis,
'Pudica et proba, redde codicillos.'

Line

42.1
42.2
42.3
42.4
42.5
42.6
42.7
42.8
42.9
42.10
42.11
42.12
42.13
42.14
42.15
42.16
42.17
42.18
42.19
42.20
42.21
42.22
42.23
42.24

== Analysis ==
E. T. Merrill describes the female figure of the poem as "an unknown woman, apparently a courtezan with whom Catullus has quarrelled, [who] refuses to return to him his tablets, and hence these verses are marshalled to enforce the demand." He believes the woman was "certainly not Lesbia, for on no occasion does Catullus speak of her or to her in a tone of careless brutality, without any trace of former regard." Some critics, especially comparing verse 5 with Catullus 43.3 and Catullus 43.6, have thought her to be Ameana, but the position of Catullus 42 between two others concerning her is perhaps an indication that such was not the opinion of the original editor of the liber Catulli.

== Sources ==
- Burton, Richard F.; Smithers, Leonard C., eds. (1894). The Carmina of Caius Valerius Catullus. London: Printed for the Translators: for Private Subscribers. pp. 77–78.
- Merrill, Elmer Truesdell, ed. (1893). Catullus (College Series of Latin Authors). Boston, MA: Ginn and Company. pp. 73–74.
