= Catullus 6 =

Poem by Catullus

Catullus 6 in Latin and English

Catullus 6

Catullus 6 is a poem by Roman poet Gaius Valerius Catullus (c. 84–c. 54 BCE) written in Phalaecean hendecasyllabic metre.

== Text ==
Original Latin

Flāvī, dēliciās tuās Catullō,
nī sint illepidae atque inēlegantēs,
vellēs dīcere nec tacēre possēs.
Vērum nescio quid febrīculōsī
scortī dīligis: hoc pudet fatērī.
Nam tē nōn viduās iacēre noctēs
nēquīquam tacitum cubīle clāmat
sertīs ac Syriō fragrāns olīvō,
pulvīnusque peraequē et hic et ille
attrītus, tremulīque quassa lectī
argūtātiō inambulātiōque.
Nam nīl stupra valet nihil tacēre.
Cūr? nōn tam latera ecfutūta pandās,
nī tū quid faciās ineptiārum.
Quārē, quidquid habēs bonī malīque,
dīc nōbīs. Volo tē ac tuōs amōrēs
ad caelum lepidō vocāre versū.

Literal English Translation

Flavius, of your darling to Catullus,
if she were not unpretty and inelegant,
you'd be wanting to speak nor could keep quiet.
But you love I don't know what of a feverish
harlot: it shames you to admit this.
For that you don't spend the nights single
your speechless bed screams in vain,
fragrant with garlands and Syrian oil,
and the mattress equally on this side and that
worn away, and the creaking and
movement of your shaking bed.
There's no point in being quiet about your debauchery.
Why, you wouldn't reveal such sexually tired
sides unless you were doing something silly.
So, whatever good and bad you have,
tell us. I want to summon you and
your love to heaven in my witty verse.

Line

6.1
6.2
6.3
6.4
6.5
6.6
6.7
6.8
6.9
6.10
6.11
6.12
6.13
6.14
6.15
6.16
6.17

== Analysis ==
Flavius is teased about an intrigue which he has in vain tried to conceal. With the general theme, American scholar E. T. Merrill compares Catullus 55.1ff. and Horace, Carmina 1.27; 2.4.

In his Victorian translation of Catullus, R. F. Burton titles the poem "To Flavius: Mis-speaking his Mistress".

== Sources ==
- Burton, Richard F.; Smithers, Leonard C., eds. (1894). The Carmina of Caius Valerius Catullus. London: Printed for the Translators: for Private Subscribers. pp. 10–12.
- Merrill, Elmer Truesdell, ed. (1893). Catullus (College Series of Latin Authors). Boston, MA: Ginn and Company. pp. 14–15.
