= Catullus 63 =

Poem by Catullus

Catullus 63 is a Latin poem of 93 lines in galliambic metre by the Roman poet Catullus.

== Context ==
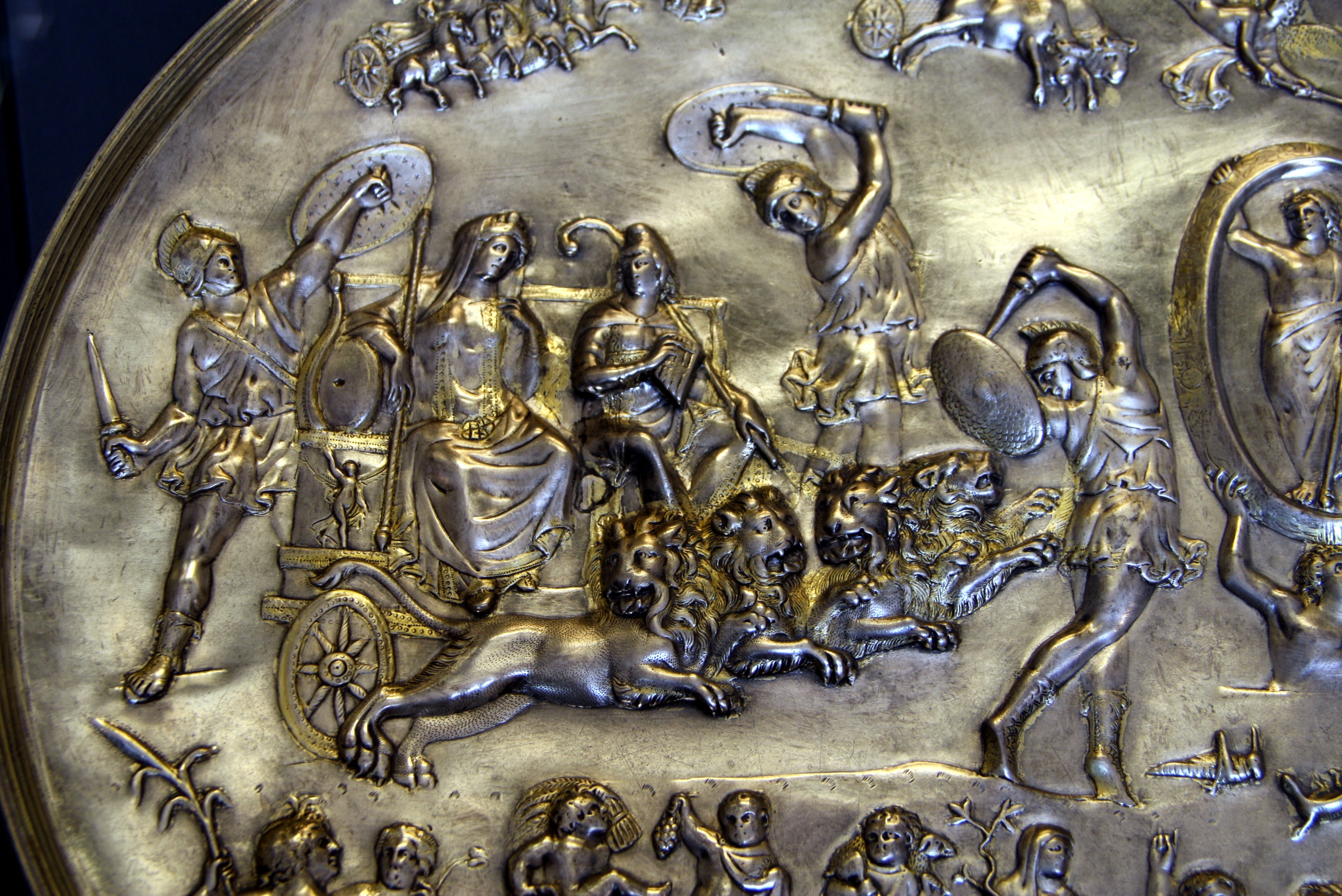
Detail of the Parabiago patera (2nd century AD) showing the Cybele and Attis group

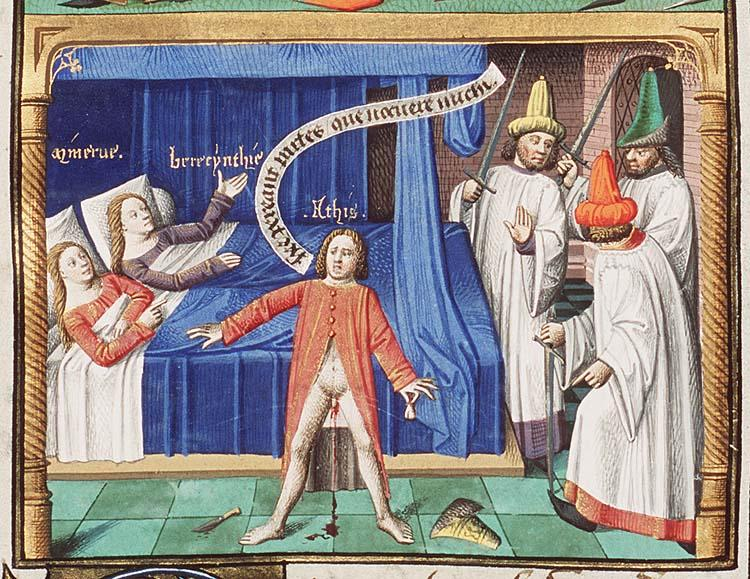
Attis castrates himself; Minerva and Cybele lie abed behind him; three men stand with drawn swords at the foot of the bed (15th century)

The poem is about the self-mutilation and subsequent lament of Attis, a priest of Cybele. The centre of the worship of the Phrygian Κυβέλη or Κυβήβη, was in very ancient times the town of Pessinus in Galatian Phrygia, at the foot of Mount Dindymus, from which the goddess received the name Dindymene. Cybele had early become identified with the Cretan divinity Rhea, the Mother of the Gods, and to some extent with Demeter, the search of Cybele for Attis being compared with that of Demeter for Persephone. The especial worship of Cybele was conducted by emasculated priests called Galli (or, with reference to their physical condition, Gallae). Their name was derived by the ancients from that of the river Gallus, a tributary of the Sangarius, by drinking from which men became inspired with frenzy. (Note: cf. Ov. Fast. 4.361ff.) The worship was orgiastic in the extreme, and was accompanied by the sound of such frenzy-producing instruments as the tympana, cymbala, tibiae, and cornu, and culminated in scourging, self-mutilation, syncope from excitement, and even death from hemorrhage or heart-failure. (Note: cf. Lucr. 2.598ff.; Varr. Sat. Men. 131 Büch. ff.; Ov. Fast. 4.179ff.) The worship of the Magna Mater, or Mater Idaea, as she was often called (perhaps from identification with Rhea of the Cretan Mount Ida rather than from the Trojan Mount Ida), was introduced into Rome in 205 BC. in accordance with a Sibylline oracle which foretold that only so could 'a foreign enemy' (i.e. Hannibal) be driven from Italy. Livy gives an interesting account of the solemnities that accompanied the transfer from Pessinus to Rome of the black stone that represented the divinity, and of the establishment of the Megalensia. (Note: Livy 29.10, 14; cf. also Ov. Fast. 4.247ff.) The stone itself was perhaps a meteorite, and is thus described by one Latin source: lapis quidam non magnus, ferri manu hominis sine ulla impressione qui posset; coloris furvi atque atri, angellis prominentibus inaequalis, et quem omnes hodie … videmus … indolatum et asperum. (Note: Arnobius Adu. Gent. 7.46.) Servius speaks of it as acus Matris Deum, and as one of the seven objects on which depended the safety of Rome. (Note: Aen. 7.188.)

According to E. T. Merrill, the early connection of Attis with the Mother of the Gods seems to point to the association of an original male element with an original female element as the parents of all things. But in the age of tradition Attis appears as a servant instead of an equal, and the subordination of the male to the female element is further emphasized by the representation of Attis, like the Galli of historic times, as an emasculated priest. Greek imagination pictured him as a beautiful youth who was beloved by the goddess, but wandered away from her and became untrue; but being sought and recalled to allegiance by her, in a passion of remorse he not only spent his life in her service, but by his own act made impossible for the future such infidelity on his part, thus setting the example followed by all the Galli after him. (Note: cf. Ov. Fast. l. c.)

== Synopsis ==
Latin recitation of Catullus 63

Catullus departs from this form of the Attis myth, and makes Attis a beautiful Greek youth who in a moment of religious frenzy sails across seas at the head of a band of companions to devote himself to the already long-established service of the goddess. On reaching the shores of Trojan Ida he consummates the irrevocable act of dedication by castrating himself, and with his companions rushes up the mountain to the sanctuary of the goddess. But on awaking next morning he feels the full awfulness of his act, and gazing out over the sea toward his lost home, bewails his fate, till the jealous goddess unyokes a lion from her car and sends him to drive her wavering votary back to his allegiance. (Note: vv. 74ff.) According to E. T. Merrill, "The story is told with a nervous vigour and swing of feeling that are unequalled in Latin literature, and to it the galliambic metre, the one traditionally appropriated to such themes, lends great effect."

== Date ==
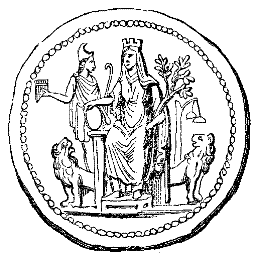
Depiction of Cybele on a Roman coin

The date of composition is uncertain, but Catullus may have found his immediate inspiration in his contact with the Cybelian worship in its original home during his residence in Bithynia in 57-56 BC. Or it may have been found in his studies in the Alexandrian poets; for Callimachus certainly used the galliambic meter, though no distinct title of a poem by him on this theme is extant. Caecilius of Comum was also engaged on a poem based on the worship of Cybele, (Note: cf. Catul. 35.13ff.) and Varro and Maecenas both exercised their talents in the same direction. (Note: cf. Varr. Sat. Men. l. c.; Maec. in Baehr. Fragm. Poet. Rom. p. 339.)

The poem abounds in rhetorical devices to add to its effect; such are the frequent employment of alliteration, (Note: vv. 2, 6, 7, 8, 9, 10, 13, etc.) of strange and harsh compounds, (Note: vv. 23 hederigerae, 34 properipedem, 45 sonipedibus, 51 erifugae, 72 nemorivagus.) and the repetition of words of agitated movement and feeling (e.g. rapidus three times, citatus four times, citus twice, rabidus three times, rabies once).

== Sources ==
- Burton, Richard F.; Smithers, Leonard C., eds. (1894). The Carmina of Caius Valerius Catullus. London: Printed for the Translators: for Private Subscribers. pp. 138–148.
- Merrill, Elmer Truesdell, ed. (1893). Catullus (College Series of Latin Authors). Boston, MA: Ginn and Company. pp. 119–130.
