= Helvius Cinna =

Roman poet (d. 44 BC)

Gaius Helvius Cinna (died 20 March 44 BC) was an influential neoteric poet of the late Roman Republic, a little older than the generation of Catullus and Calvus. He was lynched at the funeral of Julius Caesar after being mistaken for an unrelated Cornelius Cinna who had spoken out in support of the dictator's assassins.

== Overview ==
Cinna possibly came from Brixia (today's Brescia). Cinna's literary fame was established by his magnum opus Zmyrna, a mythological epic poem focused on the incestuous love of Smyrna (or Myrrha) for her father Cinyras, treated after the erudite and allusive manner of the Alexandrian poets. He was a friend of Catullus (poem 10, 29–30: meus sodalis / Cinna est Gaius). When Zmyrna was completed in about 55 BC, Catullus hailed it as a great achievement, nine harvests and nine winters in the making. The poem has not survived.

Catullus's poem is the key information to survive about his life, together with a passage in the Suda about the Augustan period poet Parthenius of Nicaea:

[Parthenius was] the son of Heracleides and Eudora (but Hermippus says Tetha was his mother). From Nicaea or Myrleia. A poet writing elegies and in various metres. He was taken by Cinna as war booty, when the Romans defeated Mithridates [sc. VI Eupator] in war. Then he was freed by reason of education and lived until the time of the Emperor Tiberius. He wrote elegies, Aphrodite, the funeral elegy for his wife Arete, an Encomium of Arete in three books, and many other works. He wrote about metamorphosis.

Ovid included Cinna in his list of celebrated erotic poets and writers (Tristia 2.435).

Although not related to them, Cinna shared the surname (cognomen) of the high noble (consular) aristocratic house Cornelii Cinnae, relatives by marriage of the famous Caesar. According to Suetonius, Valerius Maximus, Appian and Dio Cassius, at Julius Caesar's funeral in 44 BC, a certain Helvius Cinna was killed because he was mistaken for Cornelius Cinna, the conspirator. The last three writers mentioned above add that he was a tribune of the people, while Plutarch, referring to the affair, gives the further information that the Cinna who was killed by the mob was a poet. This points to the identity of Helvius Cinna the tribune with Helvius Cinna the poet.

The chief objection to this view is based upon two lines in the 9th Eclogue of Virgil, supposed to have been written in 41 or 40 BC. Here reference is made to a certain Cinna, a poet of such importance that Virgil deprecates comparison with him; it is argued that the manner in which this Cinna, who could hardly have been anyone but Helvius Cinna, is spoken of implies that he was then alive; if so, he could not have been killed in 44. But such an interpretation of the Virgilian passage is by no means absolutely necessary; the terms used do not preclude a reference to a contemporary no longer alive. It has been suggested that it was really Cornelius, not Helvius Cinna, who was slain at Caesar's funeral, but this is not borne out by the authorities.

A Propempticon Pollionis, a send-off to Asinius Pollio, is also attributed to him. In both these poems, the language of which was so obscure that they required special commentaries, his model appears to have been Parthenius of Nicaea.

== Cultural depictions ==
Shakespeare adopted Plutarch's version of Cinna's death in his Julius Caesar, adding the black humor in which he often expressed his distrust of the crowd:

CINNA. Truly, my name is Cinna.
FIRST PLEBEIAN. Tear him to pieces! He's a conspirator.
CINNA. I am Cinna the poet; I am Cinna the poet!
FOURTH PLEBEIAN. Tear him for his bad verses, tear him for his bad verses!
CINNA. I am not Cinna the conspirator!
FOURTH PLEBEIAN. It is no matter, his name's Cinna! Pluck but his name out of his heart, and turn him going!

— Julius Caesar, Act III, Scene 3.

Cinna the Poet (1959), a painting by Jacob Landau that was inspired by the Mercury Theatre's modern-dress production of Caesar (1937), is in the collection of the Museum of Modern Art.

Cinna is a character in the chamber opera Le piccole storie: Ai margini delle guerre, written in 2007 by Italian composer Lorenzo Ferrero. Cinna is the subject of I, Cinna (The Poet), a 2012 play by Tim Crouch, directed by Gregory Doran for the Royal Shakespeare Company, with Jude Owusu as the poet. This is the fifth in a series of plays by Crouch exploring Shakespeare's minor characters. Cinna is a major character in The Throne of Caesar (2018), a mystery novel by Steven Saylor. A main attribute of the character is a frequent referral to his poem Zmyrna.

In Richard Linklater's 2008 film Me and Orson Welles, English actor Leo Bill plays the role of fellow American actor Norman Lloyd, who in turn plays the role of Cinna the Poet in Orson Welles' production of Shakespeare's Julius Caesar.

== See also ==
- Helvia gens
