= Catullus 49 =

Latin poem by Catullus

Catullus 49 is a poem by the Roman poet Gaius Valerius Catullus (c. 84–c. 54 BC) sent to Marcus Tullius Cicero as a superficially laudatory poem. Like the majority of Catullus' poems, the meter of this poem is hendecasyllabic. This is also the only time Cicero is ever mentioned in any of Catullus' poems.

== Latin text and translation ==
Catullus 49 in Latin & English- Disertissime Romuli nepotum

The following Latin text is taken from D. F. S. Thomson.

Poem 49
Line	Latin Text	Literal English Translation
1	Disertissime Romuli nepotum,	O most learned of the descendants of Romulus,
2	quot sunt quotque fuere, Marce Tulli,	as many there are and as many as there were, Marcus Tullius,
3	quotque post aliis erunt in annis,	or as many as there will be later in years,
4	gratias tibi maximas Catullus	Catullus gives you the greatest thanks,
5	agit pessimus omnium poeta,	the worst of all poets,
6	tanto pessimus omnium poeta	by as much the worst poet of all,
7	quanto tu optimus omnium patronus.	as you the best lawyer/patron of all.

Notes

- The descendants of Romulus are the Romans, since it is believed that Remus and Romulus founded Rome.
- A patronus was someone who gave assistance and protection to another person, including non-Romans. The people for whom the patron spoke for were the cliens and they, in return, would respect the patronus and offer little favors like political campaigning and household chores. One of the types of patronage was the slave-owner over his freedmen, where the slave-owner retained some power over them and inherited their property if they died heirless. The betrayal of this bond or fides was a capital offense.

== The debate over the tone of the poem ==
It is a constant debate whether this poem is Catullus praising Cicero, who indeed was one of the best speakers of the time, or actually mocking him. He begins by praising him "as the most learned" of all the Romans ever. But as we keep reading, we keep seeing many more superlatives – maximas, pessimus, optimus – even the omnium could be considered as exaggerated. Usually, the frequent use of exaggeration can be discerned as sarcasm, which might be the case here. The last line also reveals more of Catullus' real intent. If Catullus is indeed being sincere, then he just simply means that Cicero was the best "patronus" of all; however, he would also be calling himself the worst poet of all, "pessimus omnium poeta", which doesn't seem much like Catullus. On the other hand, if he is being sarcastic, not only does he not call himself the worst poet of all, the claim against Cicero makes more sense: it would be saying that Cicero is the best "patronus" of all the people, the good and the bad, for money, which isn't really much of a compliment.

A point made by D.E.W. Wormwell also brings some light to the subject: a sincere thanks or praise would sound much different. In lines 4 and 5, Catullus places himself in the third person, making it impersonal in a way and less natural. Yes, Catullus is fond of addressing himself by the third person, but it is usually Catullo, Catulle, and Catullum, rarely Catullus. The feeling of third person 'Catullus' is aloof, almost cold. Another instance where the third person 'Catullus' is used is in poem 8, line 12 – vale puella. iam Catullus obdurat... – and this is clearly not a very warm and pleasing tone; rather Catullus is saying goodbye to his love and passion, Lesbia, very coldly. Thus Wormwell determines Catullus wasn't really praising Cicero, but actually mocking him.

== Classical tradition ==
Henry Fielding in Tom Jones (1749, Book VIII, ch. V) adapts the last line of the poem when he has Partridge ask Jones about Squire Allworthy, "How doth ille optimus omnium patronus?"
