= Catullus 8 =

Latin poem by Catullus

Catullus 8 in Latin and English

Catullus 8

Catullus 8 is a poem by the Roman poet Gaius Valerius Catullus (c. 84–c. 54 BCE), known by its incipit, Miser Catulle. It is written in choliambic metre.

== Text ==
Catullus 8 – Latin and English Translation
Line	Original Latin	English Translation
8.1	Miser Catulle, dēsinās ineptīre,	Miserable Catullus, stop being a fool,
8.2	et quod vidēs perīsse perditum dūcās.	and what you see has perished, consider lost.
8.3	Fulsēre quondam candidī tibī sōlēs,	Blazing suns once shone for you
8.4	cum ventitābās quō puella dūcēbat	when you would always come where the girl led,
8.5	amāta nōbīs quantum amābitur nūlla.	a girl beloved by us as no girl will ever be loved.
8.6	Ibi illa multa cum iocōsa fīēbant,	There when those many playful things happened,
8.7	quae tū volēbās nec puella nōlēbat,	things which you wanted, nor was the girl unwilling,
8.8	fulsēre vērē candidī tibī sōlēs.	truly, blazing suns shone for you.
8.9	Nunc iam illa nōn vult: tū quoque impotēns nōlī,	As it is, now she is not willing, you too, powerless, must not want:
8.10	nec quae fugit sectāre, nec miser vīve,	do not keep chasing one who flees, do not live miserably,
8.11	sed obstinātā mente perfer, obdūrā.	but endure with a resolute mind, harden yourself.
8.12	Valē puella. Iam Catullus obdūrat,	Farewell, girl! Already Catullus is firm,
8.13	nec tē requīret nec rogābit invītam.	he will not seek you out, nor will he ask you against your will.
8.14	At tū dolēbis, cum rogāberis nūlla.	But you will be sad when you are not asked at all.
8.15	Scelesta, vae tē! quae tibī manet vīta?	Woe to you, miserable woman! What sort of life remains for you?
8.16	Quis nunc tē adībit? Cui vidēberis bella?	Who now will come to you? To whom will you seem pretty?
8.17	Quem nunc amābis? Cuius esse dīcēris?	Whom now will you love? Whose will you be said to be?
8.18	Quem bāsiābis? Cui labella mordēbis?	Whom will you kiss? Whose lips will you bite?
8.19	At tū, Catulle, dēstinātus obdūrā.	But you, Catullus, be resolved to be strong.

== Analysis ==
The speaker, somewhat vainly, appeals to himself to return Lesbia's coldness with coldness. E. T. Merrill says the puella (lit. 'girl') of this poem is undoubtedly Lesbia, given the affection shown in verse 5 in particular, and in the poem as a whole. Catullus had evidently fallen in the favour of his inconstant mistress, and was ill able to put up with her coldness in a dignified manner. While, therefore, he complains of the unreasonableness of her treatment of him, he seems to have one eye open for a reconciliation. Merrill dates the poem to about 59 BC, noting the difference in tone from the "swift and brief-worded bitterness" that characterizes the poems written after the speaker had become convinced of Lesbia's unworthiness, and thinks this poem was evidently written in the time of temporary estrangement which was ended by the voluntary act of Lesbia.

In his Victorian translation of Catullus, R. F. Burton titles the poem "To Himself recounting Lesbia's Inconstancy".

== Sources ==
- Burton, Richard F.; Smithers, Leonard C., eds. (1894). The Carmina of Caius Valerius Catullus. London: Printed for the Translators: for Private Subscribers. pp. 14–15.
- Merrill, Elmer Truesdell, ed. (1893). Catullus (College Series of Latin Authors). Boston, MA: Ginn and Company. pp. 17–19.
