= Catullus 58b =

Latin poem by Catullus

Catullus 58b is a poem written by the Roman poet Catullus (c. 84 BC – c. 54 BC). In this poem he tells that even if he had the power of mythological figures, such as Perseus and Pegasus, still he would he grow weary of searching for his friend, the Camerius of Catullus 55. The meter is hendecasyllabic, the same as Catullus 55. There is debate as to the provenance of the poem. Some scholars have tried to tie it to Catullus 55, though the only connection may be that the writer chose to cut it out of 55. Others believe that it was an earlier draft of the poem. Still others feel it was a separate poem entirely and that it stands well as such. A discarded view is that Catullus did not write 58B.

== Latin version ==
Non custos si fingar ille Cretum
non si Pegaseo ferar volatu
non Ladas ego pinnipesue Perseus
non Rhesi nivease citaeque bigae
adde huc plumpipedas volatilesque
ventorumque simul require cursum
quos iunctos Cameri mihi dicares
defessus tamen omnibus medullis
et multis languoribus peresus
essem te mihi amice quaeritando

== Sources ==
- Catullus 58 B. Online translation. accessed March 11, 2010.
- C. Valerius Catullus, Carmina (ed. E. T. Merrill)
