= Publius Valerius Cato =

Roman grammarian and poet

Publius Valerius Cato (flourished 1st century BC) was a grammarian and poet of the Roman Republic. He was a leader of the Neoteric movement, whose followers rejected national epic and drama in favor of the artificial mythological epics and elegies of the Alexandrian school, preferring Euphorion of Chalcis to Ennius. They regarded knowledge of Greek literature and myths, and strict adherence to metrical rules, as indispensable to the poet. The great influence of Cato is attested by the lines: Cato grammaticus, Latina Siren, Qui solus legit ac facit poetas ("Cato, the grammarian, the Latin siren, who alone reads aloud the works and makes the reputation of poets”).

Cato was a native of Cisalpine Gaul, and lost his property during the Sullan disturbances before he came of age. During the latter part of his life he was in reduced circumstances, though at one time he had considerable wealth, and owned a villa at Tusculum which he was obliged to hand over to his creditors.

In addition to grammatical treatises, Cato wrote a number of poems, the best-known of which were the Lydia and Diana. In the Indignatio (perhaps a short poem) he defended himself against the accusation that he was of servile birth. It is probable that he is the Cato mentioned as a critic of Lucilius in the lines by an unknown author prefixed to the Satires of Horace.

Among the minor poems attributed to Virgil are two called Dirae and Lydia. The Dirae consists of imprecations against the estate of which the writer has been deprived, and where he is obliged to leave his beloved Lydia; in the Lydia, on the other hand, the estate is regarded with envy as the possessor of his charmer. Joseph Justus Scaliger was the first to attribute the poem to Valerius Cato.

== Editions ==
J. Blänsdorf, Fragmenta Poetarum Latinorum, ed. 3. auctam, Stutgartiae; Lipsiae: Teubner, 1995, ISBN 3-8154-1371-0, p. 195-196.
