= Catullus 12 =

Latin poem by Catullus

Catullus 12 read in Latin

Catullus 12 is a poem by the Roman poet Gaius Valerius Catullus (c. 84–c. 54 BCE) in which he chides Asinius Marrucinus for stealing one of his napkins, calling it uncouth and noting the disapproval of his brother, Pollio.

The meter of this poem is hendecasyllabic, a common form in Catullus's poetry.

== Text ==
Latin text

Marrucine Asini, manu sinistra
non belle uteris: in ioco atque vino
tollis lintea neglegentiorum.
Hoc salsum esse putas? Fugit te, inepte:
quamvis sordida res et invenusta est.
Non credis mihi? Crede Pollioni
fratri, qui tua furta vel talento
mutari velit—est enim leporum
differtus puer ac facetiarum.
Quare aut hendecasyllabos trecentos
exspecta, aut mihi linteum remitte,
quod me non movet aestimatione,
verum est mnemosynum mei sodalis.
Nam sudaria Saetaba ex Hiberis
miserunt mihi muneri Fabullus
Et Veranius; haec amem necesse est
ut Veraniolum meum et Fabullum.

Translation:
English translation

Marrucinus Asinius, your left hand
you use not beautifully: in joke and in wine
you take the napkins of the careless people.
You think this is witty? It [humor] escapes you, fool:
the thing is as tacky and as unattractive as can be.
You don't believe me? Believe your brother Pollio,
who would want to exchange your thefts
even for a talent—for he is a boy
stuffed of charm and wit.
Therefore either expect three hundred poems,
or send my napkin back to me,
which doesn't move me with value,
but because it is a souvenir of my drinking buddy.
For Fabullus and Veranius sent the Saetaban cloths from Hiberia
to me as a gift;
it is necessary that I love these
as I love my dear Veranius and Fabullus.

== Analysis ==
Catullus reverses the praenomen and nomen in the first line. While "Asini Marrucine" could be translated simply as "Asinius Marrucinus", the inverted word order introduces the alternative meaning "Marrucinus [son] of a jackass".

Napkins in Ancient Rome were handmade and therefore far more valuable than they are today; also, Catullus has a sentimental attachment to the napkins, as they were a gift from two close friends, Fabullus and Veranius.

In comparison to Catullus's other invective poetry, this is relatively light: the main point of the poem could be to praise Pollio rather than to chide Marrucinus.

== See also ==
- Latin poetry
- Invective

== Bibliography ==
- Nappa, C (1998). "Place Settings: Convivium, Contrast, and Persona in Catullus 12 and 13". American Journal of Philology. 119 (3): 386–397. doi:10.1353/ajp.1998.0041.
- Forsyth, PY (1985). "Gifts and Giving: Catullus 12-14". Classical World. 79 (6): 571–574. doi:10.2307/4349760. JSTOR 4349760.
