= Catullus 10 =

Poem by Catullus

Catullus 10 in Latin and English

Catullus 10 in Latin

Catullus 10 is a poem by the Roman poet Gaius Valerius Catullus (c. 84–c. 54 BCE), written in Phalaecean hendecasyllabic metre.

== Text ==
Original Latin

Vārus mē meus ad suōs amōrēs
vīsum duxerat ē forō ōtiōsum,
scortillum, ut mihi tum repente vīsum est,
nōn sānē illepidum neque invenustum.
Hūc ut vēnimus, incidēre nōbīs
sermōnēs variī: in quibus, quid esset
iam Bīthȳnia; quō modō sē habēret;
et quōnam mihi prōfuisset aere.
Respondī id quod erat, nihil neque ipsīs
nec praetōribus esse nec cohortī,
cūr quisquam caput ūnctius referret,
praesertim quibus esset irrumātor
praetor, nec faceret pilī cohortem.
"At certē tamen" inquiunt "quod illic
nātum dīcitur esse, comparāsti
ad lectīcam hominēs." Ego, ut puellae
ūnum mē facerem beātiōrem,
"nōn" inquam "mihi tam fuit malignē,
ut, prōvincia quod mala incidisset,
nōn possem octō hominēs parāre rēctōs."
At mī nūllus erat nec hīc neque illic,
frāctum quī veteris pedem grabātī
in collō sibi collocāre posset.
Hīc illa, ut decuit cinaediōrem,
"quaesō" inquit "mihi, mī Catulle, paulum
istōs commoda, nam volō ad Serāpim
dēferrī." "Mane," inquiī puellae,
"istud quod modo dīxeram mē habēre,
fūgit mē ratiō: meus sodālis
Cinna est Gāĭus — is sibī parāvit;
vērum utrum illius an meī, quid ad mē?
Ūtor tam bene quam mihī parārim.
Sed tū insulsa male et molesta vīvis,
per quam nōn licet esse neglegentem!"

Literal English Translation

My Varus had led me, at leisure, from the forum
To his loves, to visit her
A little whore, as it then immediately seemed to me,
Not really uncharming and not unattractive.
When we came to this place, varied conversations
Fell onto us, in which, what was
now Bithynia, how did it hold itself,
and with just what bronze had Bithynia profited me.
I answered that which was, that nothing neither to themselves
Nor to the praetors nor to the cohort was there;
Why anyone would bring back a oilier head,
Especially [people] to whom the governor was a pervert [irrumator],
and (to whom) didn't reckon the cohort the value of a hair.
"But certainly nevertheless" they said, "that which it is said to
be born there, you obtained
Men for the purpose of a litter." I, in order that to the girl
I might make myself (seem) one rather fortunate man,
I said "it was not so badly for me
with the result that because of the bad province that had fallen to my lot,
I was not able to obtain eight straight-backed men."
But nobody was mine, neither here nor there,
Who was able to place the foot, having been broken,
of an old couch upon his neck.
That woman, as befit a rather slutty girl,
"Please," she said, "my Catullus, lend to me for a little while
those men: for I wish to be carried to Serapus."
"Wait," I said to the girl,
"That thing which just now I had said that I had,
Reason fled me: my mate—
It is Cinna Gaius,—he obtained (the slaves) for himself.
But, whether of that man or of me, what (is it) to me?
I use them as well as (if) I obtained (them) for myself.
But you, uncharming and annoying, live badly,
Through whom is it not permitted to be careless.

Line

10.1
10.2
10.3
10.4
10.5
10.6
10.7
10.8
10.9
10.10
10.11
10.12
10.13
10.14
10.15
10.16
10.17
10.18
10.19
10.20
10.21
10.22
10.23
10.24
10.25
10.26
10.27
10.28
10.29
10.30
10.31
10.32
10.33
10.34

== Analysis ==
Catullus, or the speaker, tells at his own expense how neatly he was shown up when attempting to put on airs about his supposed wealth acquired in Bithynia, whither he went in 57 BC in the retinue of the governor Memmius. According to E. T. Merrill, "the forms of expression are thoroughly colloquial." He dates the composition to about 56 BC.

In his Victorian translation of Catullus, R. F. Burton titles the poem "He meets Varus and Mistress".

== Sources ==
- Burton, Richard F.; Smithers, Leonard C., eds. (1894). The Carmina of Caius Valerius Catullus. London: Printed for the Translators: for Private Subscribers. pp. 16–19.
- Merrill, Elmer Truesdell, ed. (1893). Catullus (College Series of Latin Authors). Boston, MA: Ginn and Company. pp. xxv, xliii, 21–24.
