= Catullus 86 =

Latin poem by Catullus

Catullus 86 is a Latin poem of six lines in elegiac couplets by the Roman poet Catullus.

== Latin Text ==
Quintia formosa est multis, mihi candida, longa,
recta est. haec ego sic singula confiteor,
totum illud “formosa” nego: nam nulla venustas,
nulla in tam magno est corpore mica salis.
Lesbia formosa est, quae cum pulcherrima tota est,
tum omnibus una omnis subripuit Veneres.

== Translation ==
Quintia is beautiful to many, to me she is fair, tall,
And upright. I thus confess all these things individually,
I deny all this "beautiful": for no charm,
Not a grain of salt is in so great a body.
Lesbia is beautiful, who is not only wholly the most beautiful,
But has alone stolen every charm from all women.

== Analysis ==
On the inferiority of Quintia to Lesbia, Catullus further treats in 43.1ff. Quintia is evidently not the Sister of the Quintius of 82.1ff. and 100.1ff; for this poem dates from the time of the faith of Catullus in Lesbia, at which time Quintius was his friend.

== Sources ==
- Merrill, Elmer Truesdell, ed. (1893). Catullus. College Series of Latin Authors. Boston, MA: Ginn and Company. pp. 205–6.
