= Catullus 11 =

Poem by Catullus

Catullus 11

Catullus 11 is a poem by Roman poet Gaius Valerius Catullus (c. 84–c. 54 BCE), in which Catullus asks his two friends, Furius and Aurelius, to deliver a message to an unspecified girl who is understood to be Lesbia. This message tells Lesbia that Catullus no longer wants to be with her.

Poem 11 is one of the two poems that Catullus writes in the Sapphic meter. The other, poem 51, is Catullus' version of one of Sappho's poems.

== Text ==
Original Latin

Fūrī et Aurēlī, comitēs Catullī,
sīve in extrēmōs penetrābit Indōs,
lītus ut longē resonante Eōā
tunditur undā,

sīve in Hyrcānōs Arabēsve mollēs,
seu Sagās sagittiferōsve Parthōs,
sīve quae septemgeminus colōrat
aequora Nīlus,

sīve trāns altās gradiētur Alpēs,
Caesaris vīsēns monimenta magnī,
Gallicum Rhēnum, horribile aequor, ultī-
mōsque Britannōs,

omnia haec, quaecumque feret voluntās
caelitum, temptāre simul parātī,
pauca nūntiāte meae puellae
nōn bona dicta.

Cum suīs vīvat valeatque moechīs,
quōs simul complexa tenet trecentōs,
nūllum amāns vērē, sed identidem omnium
īlia rumpēns;

nec meum respectet, ut ante, amōrem,
quī illĭus culpā cecidit velut prātī
ultimī flōs, praetereunte postquam
tactus arātrō est.

Literal English Translation

Furius and Aurelius, companions of Catullus,
whether (s)he will penetrate into the Indians,
where the shore is pounded by the far resounding
eastern wave,

whether [he will penetrate] into the Hyrcanians or the gentle Arabs,
whether to the Scythians or the arrow-bearing Parthians,
or the seas which the sevenfold
Nile colors,

whether he will walk across the high Alps,
gazing upon the monuments of great Caesar,
the Gallic Rhine, the terrifying English Channel,
the most remote Britons,

wherever the will of the heavenly ones brings him(/her),
those who are prepared to attempt all these things at once,
[also] announce to my girl a few
not good words.

May she live and may she be well with her 300 adulterers,
whom she holds at the same time in an embrace,
loving none truly, but repeatedly breaking
the loins of all;

and may she not look back, as before, at my love,
which, by her fault, dies like the flower at
the farthest meadow, after it was touched by the plow
passing.

Line

11.1
11.2
11.3
11.4

11.5
11.6
11.7
11.8

11.9
11.10
11.11
11.12

11.13
11.14
11.15
11.16

11.17
11.18
11.19
11.20

11.21
11.22
11.23
11.24

== Analysis ==
Scholars are divided on the interpretation of how Catullus addresses Furius and Aurelius in this poem. In other poems, they are usually addressed by Catullus in a condescending manner, but in this poem, he addresses them in a very serious manner. Some think that he is being serious and truly holds Furius and Aurelius as some of his closest friends that he will have until he dies. Others believe that Catullus has more of an ironic tone. In the first three stanzas, Catullus implies that he will go with Furius and Aurelius to several different places around the world, trying to express how good of friends they are, but the tone switches drastically in the second half of the poem as he asks them to walk across the street and break up with his girlfriend without him.

Furius is also mentioned in poems 16, 23, and 26. Aurelius is also mentioned in poems 15, 16, 21.

Another unusual thing Catullus does in this poem is that he compliments Caesar in line 10, which is uncharacteristic of Catullus compared to his other poems.
