= Catullus 4 =

Latin poem by Catullus

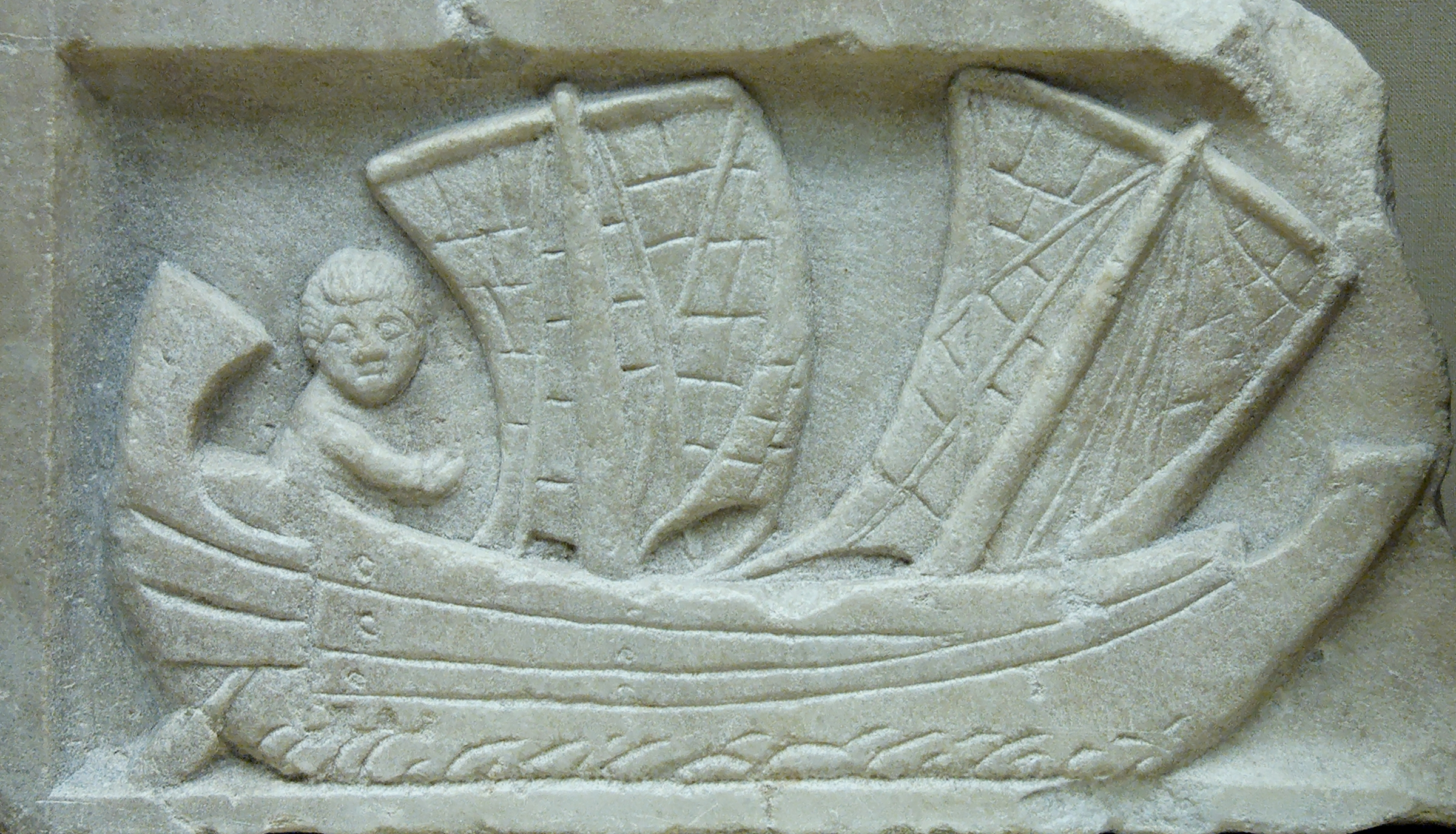
A poem about an aging ship.

Catullus 4 is a poem by the ancient Roman writer Gaius Valerius Catullus (c. 84–c. 54 BCE) that concerns the retirement of a well-traveled ship (referred to as a "phaselus", also sometimes cited as "phasellus", a variant spelling). Catullus draws a strong analogy with human aging, rendering the boat as a person that flies and speaks, with palms (the oars) and purpose.

The poem is complex, with numerous geographic references and elaborate litotic double negatives in a list-like manner. It borrows heavily from Ancient Greek vocabulary, and also uses Greek grammar in several sections. The meter of the poem is unusual — iambic trimeter, which was perhaps chosen to convey a sense of speed over the waves.

Catullus 4 read in Latin

Scholars remain uncertain whether the story of the construction and voyages of this phasellus (ship, yacht, or pinnace), as described or implied in the poem, can be taken literally. Professor A. D. Hope in his posthumous book of translations from Catullus is one translator who takes it so. His introduction calls the phasellus “his yacht, in which he [Catullus] must have made the return voyage [from Bithynia]” and the translation ends Until she made landfall in this limpid lake. / But that was aforetime and she is laid up now . . . However Hope also left, in his final collection of poetry Aubade, a much freer translation, adaptation, or erotic parody, in which the phasellus seems to be, in effect, a phallus. This version says that the phasellus claims that in his hey-day with mainsail and spanker / He outsailed all vessels; and the ending becomes: At his last landfall now, beyond all resurgence, / View him careened upon a final lee-shore; / . . . Sing for the captain who will put to sea no more!

Among a number of other interpretations, Catullus 4 has also been interpreted as a parody of epic poetry, or the boat as a metaphor for the Ship of State.

== Text ==
Latin text

phaselus ille, quem videtis, hospites
ait fuisse navium celerrimus
neque ullius natantis impetum trabis
nequisse praeterire, sive palmulis
opus foret volare sive linteo.
et hoc negat minacis Hadriatici
negare litus insulasve Cycladas
Rhodumque nobilem horridamque Thraciam
Propontida trucemve Ponticum sinum, (Note: Propontis ("in front of Pontus") was the ancient name for the Sea of Marmora, and Ponticum sinum ("Pontic sea") was the name for the Black Sea.)
ubi iste post phaselus antea fuit
comata silva; nam Cytorio (Note: Mt. Cytorus was a mountain on the southern coast of the Black Sea, between the port cities of Amastris and Cytorus. Cytorus was famous as a source of boxwood.) in iugo
loquente saepe sibilum edidit coma.
Amastri Pontica et Cytore buxifer
tibi haec fuisse et esse cognitissima
ait phaselus: ultima ex origine
tuo stetisse dicit in cacumine
tuo imbuisse palmulas in aequore
et inde tot per impotentia freta
erum tulisse, laeva sive dextera
vocaret aura, sive utrumque Iuppiter
simul secundus incidisset in pedem;
neque ulla vota litoralibus deis
sibi esse facta, cum veniret a mari
novissimo hunc ad usque limpidum lacum.
sed haec prius fuere: nunc recondita
senet quiete seque dedicat tibi
gemelle Castor et gemelle Castoris (Note: The gemelle Castoris ("twin of Castor") refers to Pollux, the other twin in the Castor and Pollux pair, who were also known as the Gemini ("twins"). The two twins were often referred to by only a single name, most commonly Castor, as though they were one, hence the tibi in line 26.)

Translation:
English translation

That light ship, which you see, guests,
says that she was the most swift of vessels
and the speed any floating timber
she was not unable to surpass, whether oars
she needed or a sail in order to fly.
And she denies that of the threatening Adriatic, this fact,
the shore denies, or the islands, Cyclades
and noble Rhodus and the rugged Thracian
Propontis, or the Pontic gulf
where she was a light ship after, before
a leafy forest; for when on the ridge of mount Cytorus
she speaks, often the foliage begets a hissing sound.
Pontic Amastris and box-tree-bearing Cytorus,
that to you these things were and are most known
says the light ship: that out of your earliest birth,
she says, she stood at your peak,
wetted her palms [or oars] in your flat sea,
and then across so many impotent straits
bore her master, whether the left or right
breeze summoned [you], or whether favourable Jupiter
fell on each foot at once;
[And she says] that neither were any prayers to the shore gods
made by her, when she came by sea
very recently to this continuously clear lake.
But these things were previously: now that secluded one
is old, and in repose she dedicates herself to you,
O twin Castor and twin of Castor.

== Bibliography ==
- Griffith, JG (1983). "Catullus Poem 4: A Neglected Interpretation Revived". Phoenix. 37 (2). Phoenix, Vol. 37, No. 2: 123–128. doi:10.2307/1087452. JSTOR 1087452.
- Coleman, KM (1981). "The Persona of Catullus' Phaselus". Greece and Rome. 28: 68–72. doi:10.1017/S0017383500033507.
- Putnam, MCJ (1962). "Catullus' Journey (Carm. 4)". Classical Philology. 57: 10–19. doi:10.1086/364642.
- Copley, FO (1958). "Catullus 4: The World of the Poem". Transactions and Proceedings of the American Philological Association. 89. Transactions and Proceedings of the American Philological Association, Vol. 89: 9–13. doi:10.2307/283659. JSTOR 283659.
