= Catullus 13 =

Latin poem by Catullus

A Latin recitation of Catullus 13

Cenabis bene, mi Fabulle, apud me is the first line, sometimes used as a title, of Carmen 13 from the collected poems of the 1st-century BC Latin poet Catullus. The poem belongs to the literary genre of mock-invitation. Fabullus is invited to dine at the poet's home, but he will need to bring all the elements of a dinner party (cena) himself: the host pleads poverty. Catullus will provide only meros amores, "the essence of love", and a perfume given to him by his girlfriend, granted to her by multiple Venuses and Cupids, guaranteed to make Fabullus wish he were totum nasum ("all nose"). Thomas Browne in his late miscellaneous tract Musaeum Clausum quotes this verse by Catullus in the form of an imaginary antiquity -

Item 18: 'A transcendent Perfume made of the richest Odorates of both the Indies, kept in a Box made of the Muschie Stone of Niarienburg, with this Inscription'.

'Deos rogato Totum ut te faciant, Fabulle, Nasum'.

== Latin text and translation ==
Line	Latin text	English translation
1	Cenabis bene, mi Fabulle, apud me	You will dine well, my Fabullus, at my house,
2	paucis, si tibi di favent, diebus	in a few days, if the gods favor you,
3	si tecum attuleris bonam atque magnam	if with you you bring a good and great
4	cenam, non sine candida puella	meal, not without an innocent girl
5	et vino et sale et omnibus cachinnis	both wine and wit and all the banter.
6	Haec si, inquam, attuleris, venuste noster,	If you bring these, I say, our dear friend,
7	cenabis bene; nam tui Catulli	you will dine well, for the wallet of your Catullus
8	plenus sacculus est aranearum.	is full of cobwebs.
9	Sed contra accipies meros amores	But in exchange you will receive the most pure friendship
10	seu quid suavius elegantiusve est:	or whatever is more sweet or more elegant:
11	nam unguentum dabo, quod meae puellae	for I will give perfume, which to my girl
12	donarunt Veneres Cupidinesque,	Venuses and Cupids have given,
13	quod tu cum olfacies, deos rogabis,	which when you will smell it, you will ask the gods,
14	totum ut te faciant, Fabulle, nasum.	to make you, Fabullus, all nose.
