= Catullus 51 =

Poem by Catullus

Catullus 51 is a poem by Roman love poet Gaius Valerius Catullus (c. 84 – c. 54 BC). It is an adaptation of one of Sappho's fragmentary lyric poems, Sappho 31. Catullus replaces Sappho's beloved with his own beloved Lesbia. Unlike the majority of Catullus' poems, the meter of this poem is the sapphic meter. This meter is more musical, seeing as Sappho mainly sang her poetry.

Catullus is not the only poet who translated Sappho’s poem to use for himself: Pierre de Ronsard and Salvatore Quasimodo are also known to have translated a version of it.

== The poem ==
Catullus 51 in Latin English Ille mi par esse deo videtur, Pronunciation Meter Notes

The following Latin text of Catullus 51 is taken from D.F.S. Thomson; the translation is literal, not literary.

1

5

10

15

Ille mi par esse deo videtur,
ille, si fas est, superare divos,
qui sedens adversus identidem te
spectat et audit
dulce ridentem, misero quod omnes
eripit sensus mihi: nam simul te,
Lesbia, aspexi, nihil est super mi
<vocis in ore;>
lingua sed torpet, tenuis sub artus
flamma demanat, sonitu suopte
tintinant aures, gemina teguntur
lumina nocte.
otium, Catulle, tibi molestum est:
otio exsultas nimiumque gestis:
otium et reges prius et beatas
perdidit urbes.

He seems to me to be equal to a god,
he, if it is permissible, seems to surpass the gods,
who sitting opposite again and again
watches and hears you
sweetly laughing, which rips out all senses
from miserable me: for at the same moment I look upon you,
Lesbia, nothing is left for me
<of my voice in my mouth;>
But my tongue grows thick, a thin flame
runs down beneath my limbs, with their own sound
my ears ring, my lights (eyes)
are covered by twin night.
Idleness is a troublesome thing for you, Catullus:
In idleness you revel and delight too much:
Idleness has destroyed both kings and
blessed cities before.

- Catullus here builds upon a common interpretation of the lost original verse from Sappho. For a reconstruction of the original Greek first verse, see Sappho 31.
- Line 8 is missing from the original manuscript. Oxford Classical Texts (ed. R.A.B. Mynors) provides no substitution. It is possible in fact that it was deliberately left unfinished.

== Modern musical setting ==
This poem was set to music by Carl Orff as part of his Catulli Carmina (1943).

== See also ==
- Otium
- Catullus 11
