= John Chatwin =

English poet

John Chatwin (c. 1667 – after 1685) was an English poet of the Restoration.

Little is recorded of Chatwin's life. He went up to Emmanuel College, Cambridge in 1682, and graduated BA in 1686. Although only one of Chatwin's poems was published in his lifetime, over two hundred pages of verse in his hand survive in manuscript, including translations of two poems from the Neo-Latin of Kazimierz and a version of Catullus 5 in rhyming couplets, both in MS. Rawl. poet. 94 in the Bodleian. The Bodleian volume was written in about 1682-5 and includes an impressive selection of original poems and translations.

== Sources ==
- Elliot, Alistair. “Catullus by Several Hands.” Translation and Literature 12, no. 2 (2003): 252–62. JSTOR 40339948.
- Fordoński, Krzysztof and Piotr Urbański, eds., Casimir Britannicus: English Translations, Paraphrases, and Emulations of the Poetry of Maciej Kazimierz Sarbiewski. London: Modern Humanities Research Association, 2010.
- Kraszewski, Charles S. The Polish Review 53, no. 3 (2008): 380–85. JSTOR 25779758.
