= Neoterics =

Avant-garde Ancient Greek and Latin poets

The Neoterikoi (Ancient Greek: νεωτερικοί; Latin: poetae novi, "new poets"), also known as the Neoterics or, according to Cicero, cantores Euphorionis ("singers of Euphorion"), were a series of avant-garde Latin poets who wrote in the 1st century BCE. Neoteric poets deliberately turned away from classical Homeric epic poetry. Rather than focusing on the feats of ancient heroes and gods, they propagated a new style of poetry through stories that operated on a smaller scale in regard to themes and setting.

Although the poems of the Neoterics may seem to address superficial subjects, many scholars view their work as subtle and accomplished works of art. Neoteric poetry has frequently been compared to the Modernist movement of the late 19th through the 20th century, as well as the Imagist movement.

== Neoterics ==
Influenced by the Greek Hellenistic poets, the Neoterics rejected traditional social and literary norms. Their poetry is characterized by tight construction, a playful use of genre, punning, and complex allusions. The most significant surviving Neoteric works are those of Catullus. His poetry exemplifies the elegant vocabulary, meter, and sound – all of which the Neoterics sought – while balancing those elements with the equally important allusive characteristic of the Neoteric style.

Latin poets normally classified as Neoterics are Catullus and his fellow poets, such as Helvius Cinna, Publius Valerius Cato, Marcus Furius Bibaculus, Quintus Cornificius, among others. Some Neoteric stylistic features can also be seen in the works of Vergil, who was a generation younger than the poetae novi. The Neoterics were occasionally the subject of scorn from older and more traditionally minded Romans, such as Cicero.

== See also ==
- Prosody (Latin)
