= Catullus 68 =

Elegy by Catullus

Poem 68 is a complex elegy written by Catullus, who lived in the 1st century BCE during the time of the Roman Republic. This poem addresses common themes of Catullus' poetry such as friendship, poetic activity, love and betrayal, and grief for his brother. The poem is addressed to his friend, Manius or Allius, and engages with scenes from the myth of Troy.

== Poem text ==
Text of Poem 68

== Structure ==
Although most editors treat Poem 68 as one poem, its rambling qualities have sparked debate whether it is better to split it into two poems. Some editors have chosen to divide the poem in 68a and 68b at line 41. Other reasons some editors have divided the poem are the references to potentially two different friends, Manius and Allius, although these are potentially two different names for the same person. Additionally, Elena Theodorakopoulos argues that 68a and b could be viewed as a letter and accompanying poem similar to the relation between Catullus 65 and 66.

The poem begins as a letter addressed to a friend and quickly delves into topics such as friendship and his tortured romantic life. He uses the myth of Laodamia and Protesilaus to transition from themes of love and loyalty to grief over his brother's death. Arthur Wheeler describes Catullus' thematic progression in the poem: "He works through the friendship to the love and so to the sorrow and then back again in reverse order: sorrow, love, friendship. The structure may be represented by the letters A B C B A, and the parts also of each main theme are arranged with equal symmetry…To me it appears to be an extreme development of the old Homeric digression of the tale within the tale…."

== Connections to Homer and Greek myth ==
Central to this poem is the story of Protesilaus and Laodamia from the Trojan cycle. Protesilaus and Laodamia were married shortly before the Trojan War, in which he was the first Greek to die. In her grief, Laodamia committed suicide by jumping onto the fire that destroyed a bronze statue of her late husband. Daniel Garrison connects this story to Catullus' relationship with Lesbia saying, "Catullus was separated from Lesbia by his brother's death near Troy, Protesilaus from Laodamia by his own death in the Trojan War." This connection that Garrison draws explains Catullus' transition to the death of his brother, who died where the Romans believed Troy to be. Catullus returns to the theme of Lesbia's infidelity when he compares her behavior to Laodamia's faithfulness in lines 117 and 131.

Overall, Catullus portrays Troy as a negative place calling it "ill-omened", "obscene", and "ill-fated". His negative description of Troy is not limited to his grief for his brother's death but extends to his allusions of the entire war. Theodorakopoulos explains, "In both poems 64 and 68 it is clear that Troy is an abomination, not the glory that contemporary Romans may have been seeking to gain from connection with it. Troy stands for the strangeness of death, for the remoteness of the world of the dead from that of the living."

A metaphoric connection has been made to the poem's reference to Hercules, whose painful death by burning led to his apotheosis and marriage to the goddess Hebe, leading him to achieve eternal happiness. In comparison, Catullus' burning passion for Lesbia leads only to adultery with the implication that his family line has died with his brother.
