= Elmer Truesdell Merrill =

Elmer Truesdell Merrill (1860 – 20 April 1936) was an American Latin scholar, born at Millville, Massachusetts. Merrill graduated from Wesleyan University in 1881. He is primarily remembered for his student edition of the Roman poet Catullus and for his studies on the text and tradition of the Letters of Pliny the Younger, culminating in his 1914 Teubner edition, which constituted an important basis for the works of later scholars.

Merrill taught at the Massachusetts State Normal School, Westfield, Massachusetts (1882–83), at Wesleyan University (1883–86), at University of Southern California (1887–88), again at Wesleyan (1888–1905) as professor of Latin language and literature, and at Trinity College, Hartford, Connecticut (1905–08). In 1908 he became professor of Latin at the University of Chicago, where he taught until his retirement in 1925.

In 1898–99, he was professor, in 1899–1900, acting chairman, in 1900–01, chairman of the work of the American School of Classical Studies in Rome. After 1906 he was associate editor of Classical Philology, and in 1906–07 he served as president of the American Philological Association. He was ordained a priest in the Episcopal Church in 1895 and received an LL.D from the University of St. Andrews in 1911.

In 1923, the Bibliotheca Teubneriana published Merrill's scholarly edition of Catullus. His effort was not well received by fellow Classicists, most notably the poet and scholar A. E. Housman, who offered a particularly scathing review. Merrill's student edition of Catullus remained a standard in American classrooms for much of the twentieth century.

== Works ==
- Poems of Catullus (1893)
- Fragments of Roman Satire (1897)
- Selected Letters of the Younger Pliny (1903)
- C. Plini Caecili Secundi Epistularum Libri Novem (Teubner, 1914)
- Catulli Veronesis liber (Teubner, 1923)
- Essays in Early Christian History (1924)
