= Catullus =

Roman poet (c. 84 – c. 54 BC)

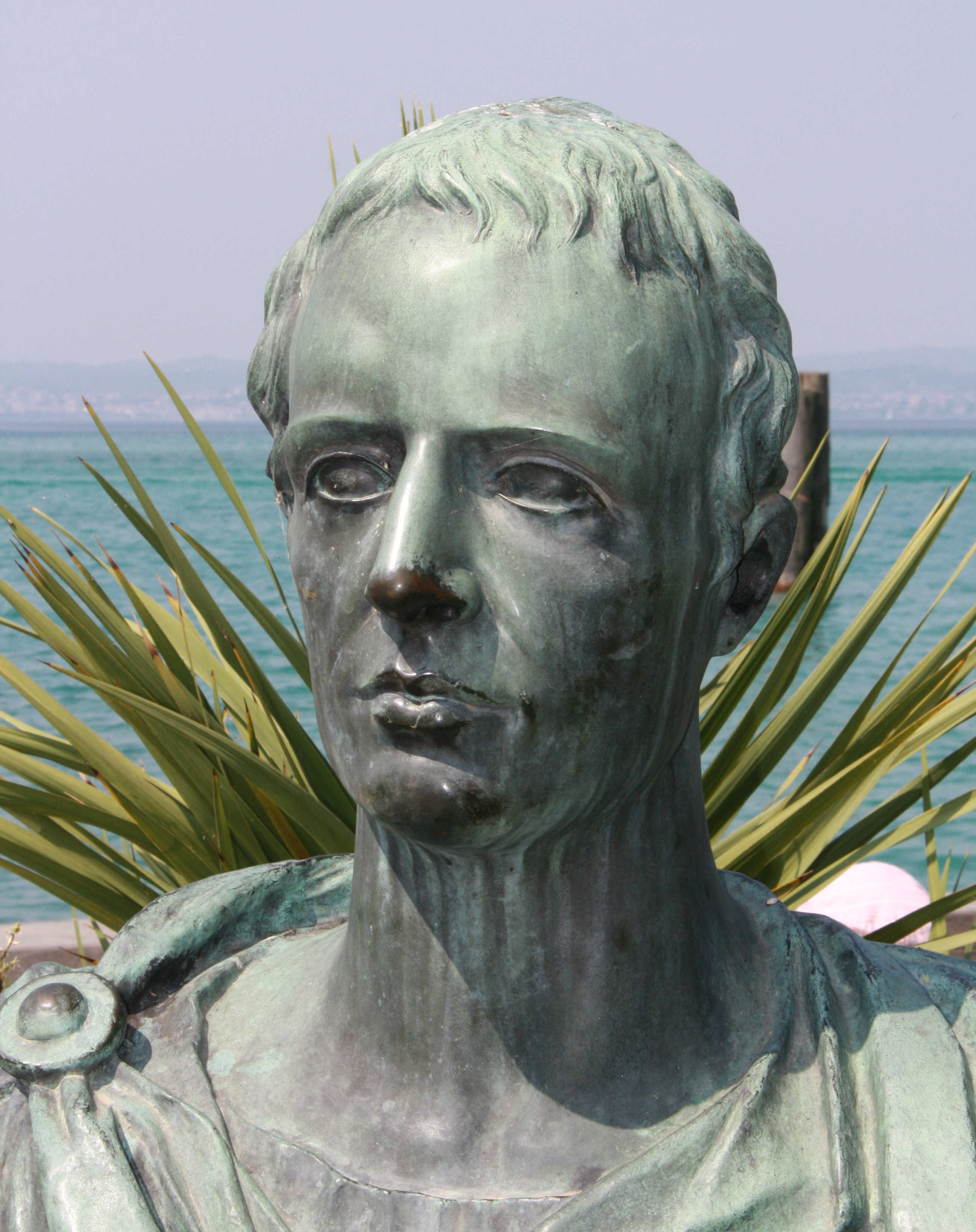
- 20th-century bust of Catullus on the Piazza Carducci in Sirmione
- Born: Gaius Valerius Catullus c. 84 BC; Verona, Italy, Roman Republic
- Died: c. 54 BC (age 29–30); Rome, Italy, Roman Republic
- Occupation: Poet
- Writing career
- Language: Latin
- Genre: Lyric poetry

Gaius Valerius Catullus (Classical Latin: [ˈɡaːius waˈlɛrius kaˈtullus]; c. 84 – c. 54 BC), known as Catullus (/kəˈtʌləs/ kə-TUL-əs), was a Latin neoteric poet of the late Roman Republic. His surviving works remain widely read due to their popularity as teaching tools and because of their personal or sexual themes.

== Life ==
Gāius Valerius Catullus was born to a leading equestrian family of Verona, in Cisalpine Gaul. The social prominence of his family allowed his father to entertain Julius Caesar when he was the Promagistrate (proconsul) of both Gallic provinces. In poem 31, Catullus describes his happy homecoming to the family villa at Sirmio, a peninsula on Lake Garda, near Verona, at a site known today as the Grottoes of Catullus. Catullus or his family also owned a villa near the resort of Tibur (modern Tivoli).

Catullus appears to have spent most of his young adult years in Rome. His friends there included the poets Licinius Calvus and Helvius Cinna, Quintus Hortensius (son of the orator and rival of Cicero), and the biographer Cornelius Nepos, to whom Catullus dedicated a libellus of poems, the relation of which to the extant collection remains a matter of debate. He appears to have been acquainted with the poet Marcus Furius Bibaculus. A number of prominent contemporaries appear in his poetry, including Cicero, Caesar and Pompey. Cicero wrote in scorn about the "new poets", a group that can probably be identified with the circle of Catullus. According to an anecdote preserved by Suetonius, Caesar did not deny that Catullus's lampoons left an indelible stain on his reputation, but when Catullus apologized, he invited the poet for dinner the very same day.

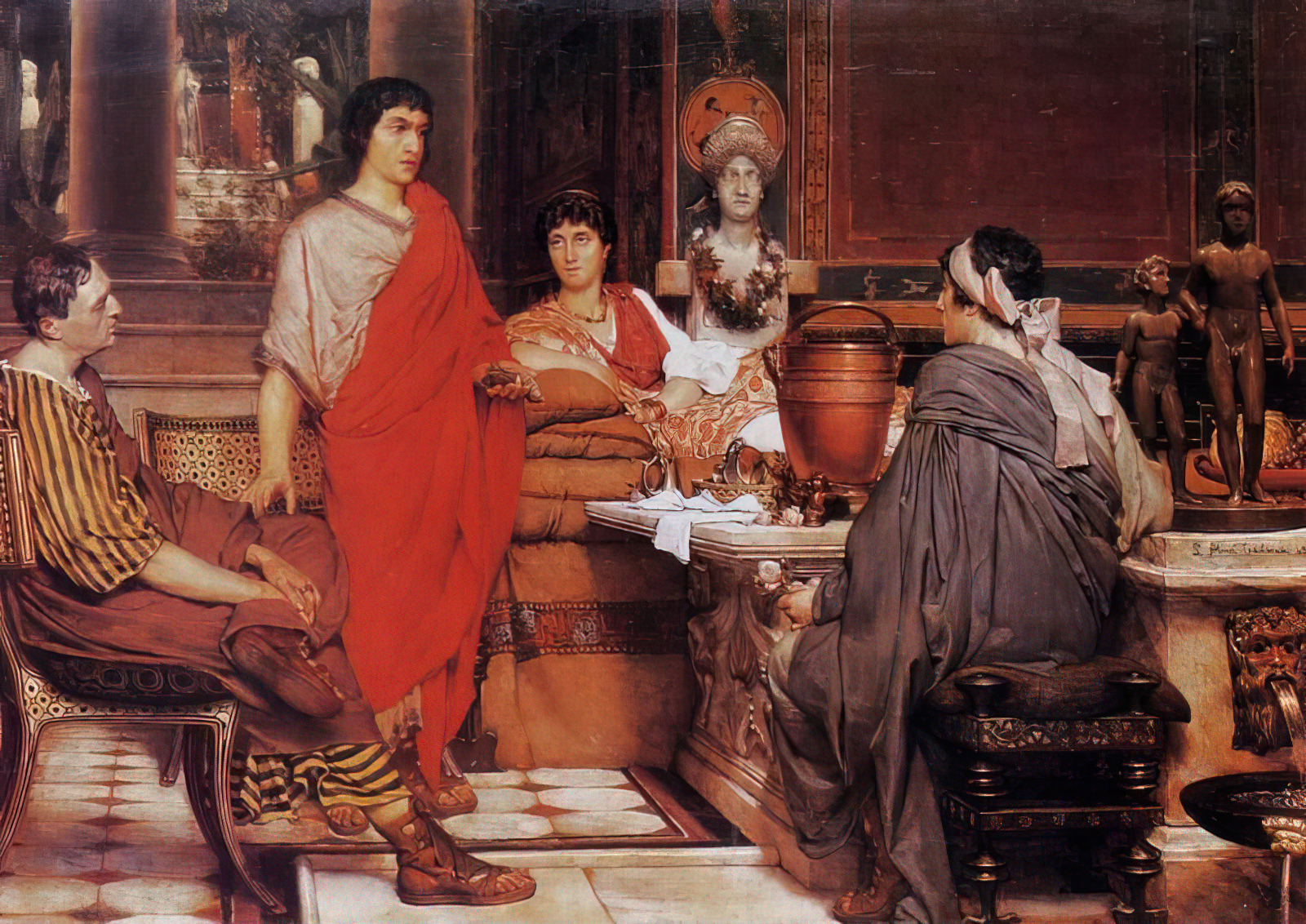
Catullus at Lesbia's by Sir Lawrence Alma-Tadema

The "Lesbia" of his poems is usually identified with Clodia Metelli, a sophisticated woman from the aristocratic house of patrician family Claudii Pulchri, sister of the infamous Publius Clodius Pulcher, and wife to Quintus Caecilius Metellus Celer (consul of 60 BC). The Roman writer Apuleius said that Lesbia was a certain Clodia. In his poems Catullus describes several stages of their relationship: initial euphoria, doubts, separation, and his wrenching feelings of loss. Clodia had several other partners; "From the poems one can adduce no fewer than five lovers in addition to Catullus: Egnatius (poem 37), Gellius (poem 91), Quintius (poem 82), Rufus (poem 77), and Lesbius (poem 79)." There is also some question surrounding her husband's mysterious death in 59 BC: in his speech Pro Caelio Cicero hints that he may have been poisoned. However, a sensitive and passionate Catullus could not relinquish his flame for Clodia, regardless of her obvious indifference to his desire for a deep and permanent relationship. In his poems, Catullus wavers between devout, sweltering love and bitter, scornful insults that he directs at her blatant infidelity (as demonstrated in poems 11 and 58). His passion for her is unrelenting—yet it is unclear when exactly the couple split up for good. Catullus's poems about the relationship display striking depth and psychological insight.

Bithynia within the Roman Empire

He spent the year from summer 57 to summer 56 BC in Bithynia on the staff of the commander Gaius Memmius. While in the East, he traveled to the Troad to perform rites at his brother's tomb, an event recorded in a moving poem (101).

No ancient biography of Catullus has survived. His life has to be pieced together from scattered references to him in other ancient authors and from his poems. Thus it is uncertain when he was born and when he died. Jerome stated that he was born in 87 BC and died in Rome in his 30th year. However, Catullus's poems include references to events of 55 BC. Since the Roman consular fasti make it somewhat easy to confuse 87–57 BC with 84–54 BC, some scholars accept the dates 84–54 BC, supposing that his latest poems and the publication of his libellus coincided with the year of his death. Other authors suggest 52 or 51 BC as the year of the poet's death. Though upon his brother's death Catullus lamented that their "whole house was buried along" with the deceased, the existence (and prominence) of Valerii Catulli is attested in the following centuries. T. P. Wiseman argues that after the brother's death Catullus could have married, and that, in this case, the later Valerii Catulli may have been his descendants.

== Poetry ==
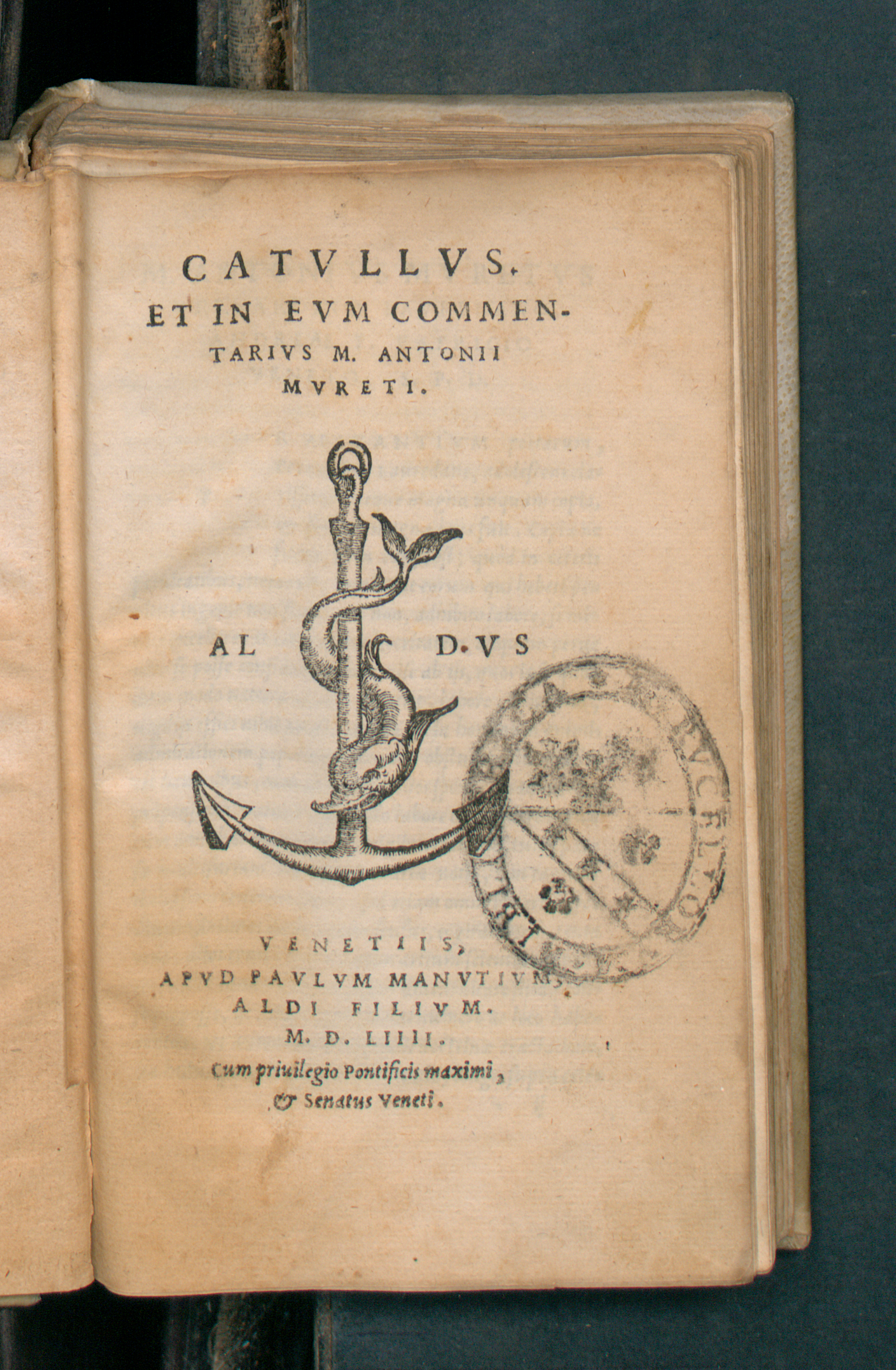
Catullus et in eum commentarius (1554)

=== Sources and organization ===
Catullus's poems have been preserved in an anthology of 116 carmina (the actual number of poems may slightly vary in various editions), which can be divided into three parts according to their form: approximately sixty short poems in varying meters, called polymetra, nine longer poems, and forty-eight epigrams in elegiac couplets. Each of these three parts – approximately 860 (or more), 1136, and 330 lines, respectively – would fit onto a single scroll.

The text used today is based on a manuscript that surfaced in Verona in 1305. After the late 2^{nd} century CE, Catullus’ poetry was relatively unknown. St. Jerome, Boethius and others include references to his poetry. In 1305 the Verona (or V) manuscript was discovered, but again disappeared. Two copies were made. One is now in the Bodleian Library, Oxford. The other, probably owned by Petrarch, was copied and then it too disappeared.

There is no scholarly consensus on whether Catullus himself arranged the order of the poems, but there are arguments for a Catullan arrangement based on external and aesthetic interpretations. One question is about which poem was first. Poem 2 begins with the word passer, sparrow, and Martial mentions a book of light verse known as Passer. Since collections were usually known from the first poem's first words, The passer poem should be first. But a dedication poem begins this libellus, little book.

Two signs of intentional ordering in the collection are thematic groupings of some sections and the pairing of poems with one of contrasting content. But these are not conclusive. For instance, there is a grouping of Lesbia poems (2, 3, 5, 7, 8, and 11 that speak of the course of the affair) but these are not the only Lesbia poems in the corpus.

The longer poems often lack Catullus’s lyrical style. They differ from the polymetra and the epigrams not only in length but also in their subjects: several of them are based on the theme of marriage. 61 and 62 are traditional marriage hymns. The poems promote Roman ideals of marriage. Poem 64 is his longest poem. It is a miniature epic, or 'epyllion'. The longest (64) of 408 lines, contains two myths (the abandonment of Ariadne and the marriage of Peleus and Thetis), one story included inside the other. The poem says that this marriage is the last time the gods visited mortals. Poem 64 was written in dactylic hexameter, the epic meter. This poem demonstrates an important trait of Neoteric poetry: chronological dislocations (order of events is less important than compositional balance).. Collectively the longer poems show the presiding influence of Hellenistic Alexandria and Callimachus in particular (Poem 66 translates his Coma Berenices). Poem 68 marks the invention or prologue of the genre of Roman Erotic Elegy as later developed by Gallus, Tibullus, Propertius and Ovid.

The polymetra and the epigrams can be divided into four major thematic groups (ignoring a rather large number of poems that elude such categorization):

- poems to and about his friends (e.g., an invitation like poem 13).
- erotic poems: some of them about his attraction for a boy named Juventius, but others about women, especially "Lesbia". This is likely the sister of Publius Clodius, a married woman named Clodia. "Lesbia" served as a source of inspiration for many of his poems. Clodia was educated and sophisticated.
- invectives: often rude and sometimes downright obscene poems targeted at friends-turned-traitors (e.g., poem 16), other lovers of Lesbia, well-known poets, and politicians (e.g., Julius Caesar and Cicero).
- condolences: some poems of Catullus are solemn in nature. 96 comforts a friend in the death of a loved one; several others, most famously 101, lament the death of his brother.

Above all other qualities, Catullus seems to have valued venustas, or charm, in his acquaintances, a theme which he explores in a number of his poems.

=== Intellectual influences ===
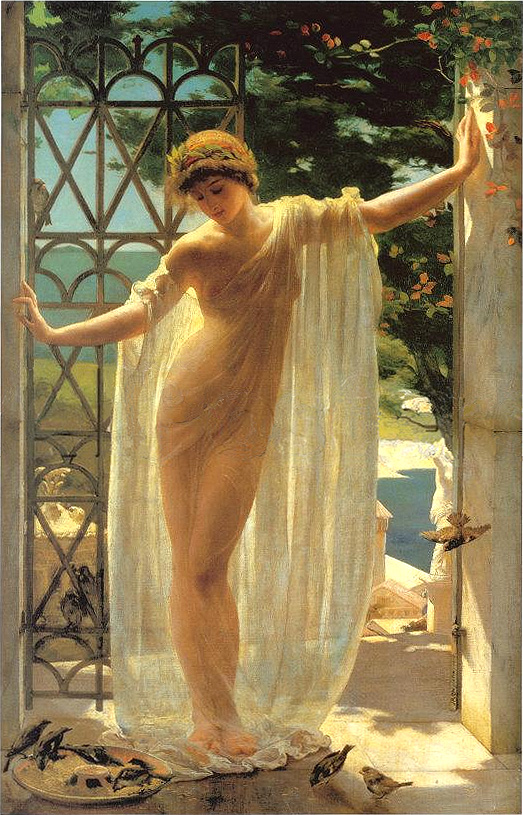
Lesbia, 1878 painting by John Reinhard Weguelin inspired by the poems of Catullus

Catullus's poetry was influenced by the innovative poetry of the Hellenistic Age, and especially by Callimachus and the Alexandrian school, which had propagated a new style of poetry that deliberately turned away from the classical epic poetry in the tradition of Homer. Cicero called these local innovators neoteroi (νεώτεροι) or "moderns" (in Latin poetae novi or 'new poets'), in that they cast off the heroic model handed down from Ennius in order to strike new ground and ring a contemporary note - see especially W.R. Johnson's essay "Neoteric Poetics". Catullus and Callimachus did not describe the feats of ancient heroes and gods (except perhaps in re-evaluating and predominantly artistic circumstances, e.g. poem 64), focusing instead on small-scale personal themes. Although these poems sometimes seem quite superficial and their subjects often are mere everyday concerns, they are accomplished works of art. Catullus described his work as expolitum, or polished, to show that the language he used was very carefully and artistically composed.

Catullus was also an admirer of Sappho, a female poet of the seventh century BC. Catullus 51 partly translates, partly imitates, and transforms Sappho 31. Catullus twice used a meter that Sappho was known for, called the Sapphic stanza, in poems 11 and 51, perhaps prompting his successor Horace's interest in the form.

Catullus, as was common to his era, was greatly influenced by stories from Greek and Roman myth. His longer poems—such as 63, 64, 65, 66, and 68—allude to mythology in various ways. Some stories he refers to are the wedding of Peleus and Thetis, the departure of the Argonauts, Theseus and the Minotaur, Ariadne's abandonment, Tereus and Procne, as well as Protesilaus and Laodamia.

=== Style ===
Catullus wrote in many different meters including hendecasyllabic verse and elegiac couplets (common in love poetry). A great part of his poetry shows strong and occasionally wild emotions, especially in regard to Lesbia (e.g., poems 5 and 7). His love poems are very emotional and ardent, and are relatable to this day. Catullus describes his Lesbia as having multiple suitors and often showing little affection towards him. He also demonstrates a great sense of humour such as in Catullus 13.

=== Poets influenced by Catullus ===
The rebirth of Catullus’ poetry following the discovery of the Verona manuscript influenced writers as diverse as John Milton, Robert Herrick, Petrarch, William Butler Yeats, Robert Frost, and Ezra Pound. Ezra Pound saw his time as a period of artistic collapse and drew on poets like Catullus to recreate the artistic culture. He believed that poetry could only move forward by reexamining classical poems. Catullus was Robert Frost's favorite Roman poet. His poem “For Once, Then, Something” (1920) was written in hendecasyllables. Tennyson also admired Catullus and used the hendecasyllable meter in two poems.

== Musical settings ==
The Hungarian-born British composer Mátyás Seiber set Catullus 31 (Sirmio) for unaccompanied mixed chorus (1956). The American composer Ned Rorem’s song “Catullus: On the Burial of His Brother” sets poem 101 for voice and piano.

Pulitzer winning American composer Dominick Argento set verses of Catullus for mixed chorus and percussion in 1981. I Hate and I Love presents about 50 lines of text over eight movements using the composer's own translation into English. The Dale Warland Singers, who commissioned the work, recorded it, as did Robert Shaw with his Festival Chorus.

Catullus Dreams (2011) is a song cycle by David Glaser set to texts of Catullus, scored for soprano and eight instruments; it premiered at Symphony Space in New York by soprano Linda Larson and Sequitur Ensemble. Carmina Catulli is a song cycle arranged from 17 of Catullus's poems by American composer Michael Linton. The cycle was recorded in December 2013 and premiered at Carnegie Hall's Weill Recital Hall in March 2014 by French baritone Edwin Crossley-Mercer and pianist Jason Paul Peterson.

Thomas Campion also wrote a lute-song entitled "My Sweetest Lesbia" dating from 1601 using his own translation of the first six lines of Catullus 5 followed by two verses of his own; the translation by Richard Crashaw was set to music in a four-part glee by Samuel Webbe Jr. It was also set to music, in a three-part glee by John Stafford Smith.

Catullus 5, the love poem Vivamus mea Lesbia atque amemus, in the translation by Ben Jonson, was set to music in 1606, (lute accompanied song) by Alfonso Ferrabosco the younger. Dutch composer Bertha Tideman-Wijers used Catullus's text for her composition Variations on Valerius's "Where that one already turns or turns" (1929). The Icelandic composer Jóhann Jóhannsson set Catullus 85 to music; entitled Odi Et Amo, the song is found on Jóhannsson's album Englabörn, and is sung through a vocoder, and the music is played by a string quartet and piano. Catulli Carmina is a cantata by Carl Orff dating from 1943 that sets texts from Catullus to music. Finnish jazz singer Reine Rimón has recorded poems of Catullus set to standard jazz tunes.

== Cultural depictions ==
- Catullus's love poems inspired the painting Catullus at Lesbia's by Lawrence Alma-Tadema (1865).
- The 1888 play Lesbia by Richard Davey depicts the relationship between Catullus and Lesbia, based on incidents from Catullus's poems.
- Both Catullus and Clodia appear as major characters in Thornton Wilder's 1948 epistolary novel The Ides of March. Several excerpts from Catullus's poems are included.
- Catullus was the main protagonist of the historical novel Farewell, Catullus (1953) by Pierson Dixon. The novel shows the corruption of Roman society.
- Vladimir Nabokov's 1955 novel Lolita makes multiple explicit and implicit allusions to Catullus's work.
- W. G. Hardy's novel The City of Libertines (1957) tells the fictionalized story of Catullus and a love affair during the time of Julius Caesar. The Financial Post described the book as "an authentic story of an absorbing era".
- A poem by Catullus is being recited to Cleopatra in the eponymous 1963 film when Julius Caesar comes to visit her; they talk about him (Cleopatra: "Catullus doesn't approve of you. Why haven't you had him killed?" Caesar: "Because I approve of him.") and Caesar then recites other poems by him.
- The American poet Louis Zukofsky in 1969 wrote a set of homophonic translations of Catullus that attempted in English to replicate the sound as primary emphasis, rather than the more common emphasis on sense of the originals (although the relationship between sound and sense there is often misrepresented and has been clarified by careful study); his Catullus versions have had extensive influence on contemporary innovative poetry and homophonic translation, including the work of poets Robert Duncan, Robert Kelly, and Charles Bernstein.
- Robert de Maria wrote a fictional account of Catullus's life in his 1965 novel Clodia.
- Catullus was referenced by Baxter Slate in Joseph Wambaugh's 1975 novel The Choirboys.
- Catullus is the protagonist of Tom Holland's 1995 novel Attis.
- Catullus appears in Steven Saylor's 1995 novel The Venus Throw as the embittered ex-lover of Clodia, sister of Publius Clodius Pulcher, whom he calls Lesbia.

== See also ==
- Poetry of Catullus
- List of poems by Catullus
- Codex Vaticanus Ottobonianus Latinus 1829
- Prosody (Latin)
