= Ludwig Schwabe =

German classical philologist (1835–1908)

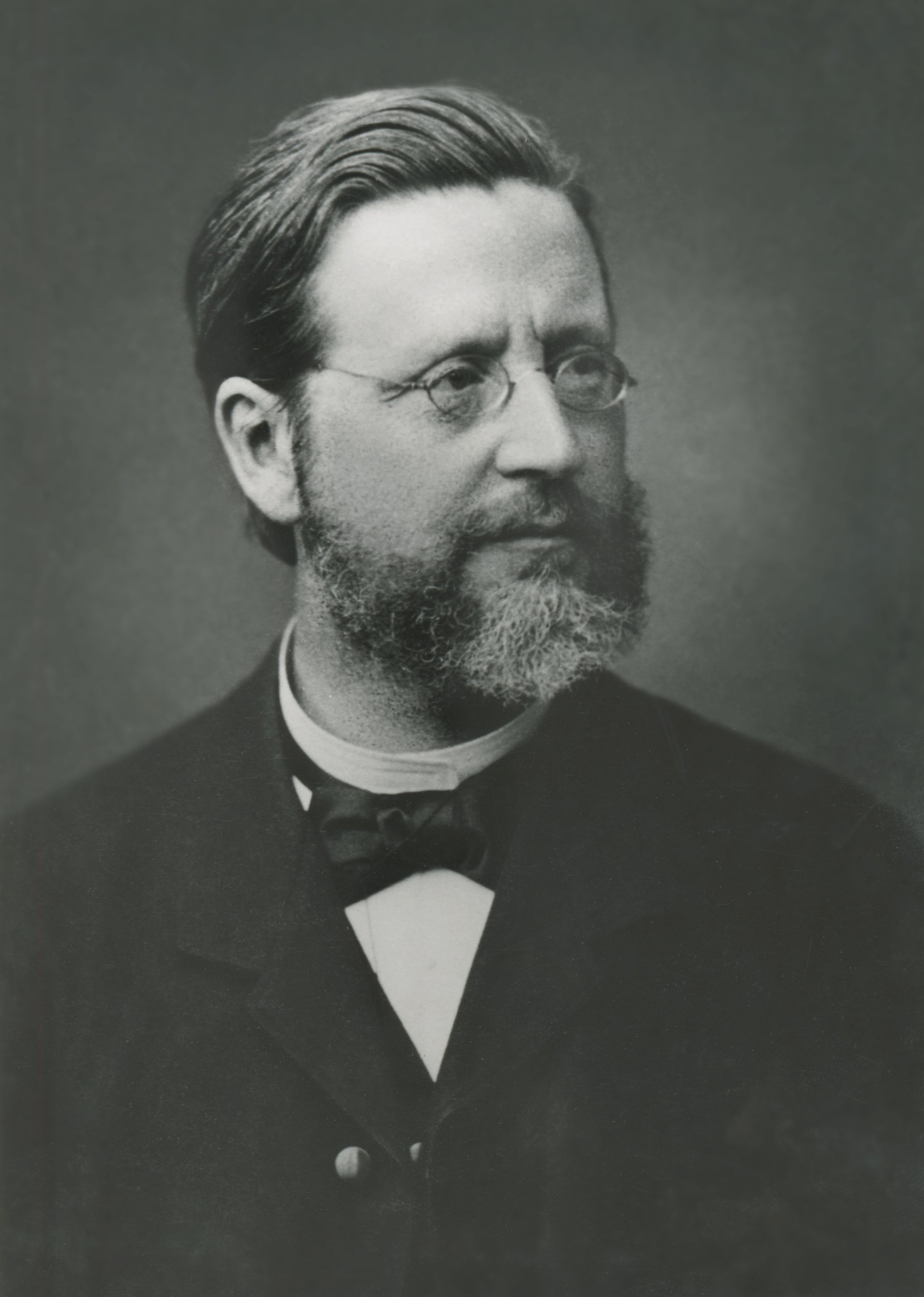
- Born: July 24, 1835; Giessen
- Died: February 20, 1908 (aged 72)

Academic background
- Education: University of Giessen; University of Göttingen

Academic work
- Discipline: Classical studies
- Institutions: University of Tübingen

Ludwig Schwabe (June 24, 1835 – February 20, 1908) was a German classical philologist and professor of classical archaeology born in Giessen.

He studied classical philology and archaeology at the Universities of Giessen and Göttingen, receiving his doctorate in 1857 at Giessen. In 1863 he became an associate professor at Giessen, and soon afterwards relocated to the Imperial University of Dorpat as a professor of classical philology. In 1872 he was appointed professor of classical philology and chair of classical archaeology at the University of Tübingen, where in 1881–82 he was university rector.

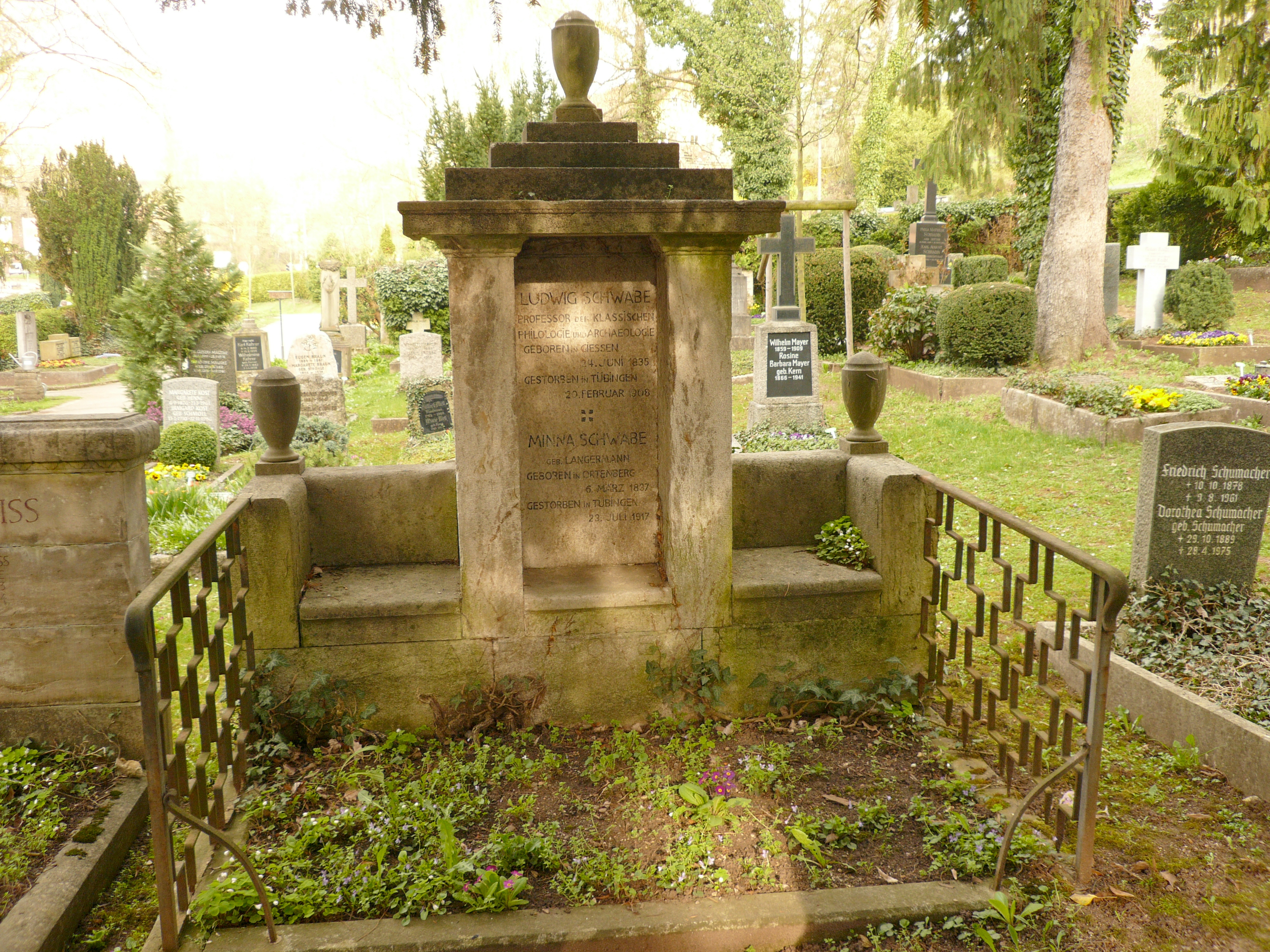
Tomb of Ludwig Schwabe in Tübingen

== Literary works ==
Among his written works was a revision of Wilhelm Siegmund Teuffel's Geschichte der römischen Literatur (1882). Other noted publications by Schwabe include:

- Schwabe, Ludwig (1862). Quaestiones Catullianae [Catullan Questions]. C. Valerii Catulli Liber (in Latin). Vol. 1. Giessen: J. Ricker. OCLC 18915264.
- Ludovici Schwabii In Cirin carmen Observationes pars I, 1871
- Zu Plautus Menaechmen, 1872
- Ludovici Schwabii de Musaeo Nonni imitator liber, 1876
- Pergamon und seine Kunst, 1882
- Die kaiserlichen Dezennalien und die alexandrinischen Münzen, 1896

In Quaestiones Catullianae, Schwabe argued that the Lesbia, described in the works of the Roman poet Catullus as his adulterous lover, should be identified as Clodia Metelli. He connected Catullus's portrayal of Lesbia to Clodia Metelli's unhappy relationship with her husband, Quintus Caecilius Metellus Celer, and her reputation for adultery, both of which were claimed by the advocate Cicero, who castigated Clodia's character in his defence speech (the Pro Caelio) for her ex-lover Marcus Caelius Rufus in a court case of April 56 BCE.

== Works cited ==
- Dyson, Julia T. (2007). "The Lesbia Poems". In Skinner, Marilyn B. (ed.). A Companion to Catullus. Chichester: Blackwell. pp. 254–275. doi:10.1002/9780470751565.ch14. ISBN 978-1-4051-3533-7.
- Wiseman, Timothy Peter (2022). Catullan Questions Revisited. Cambridge University Press. doi:10.1017/9781009235761. ISBN 978-1-009-23576-1.
