= Lesbia =

Character in the works of the Roman poet Catullus

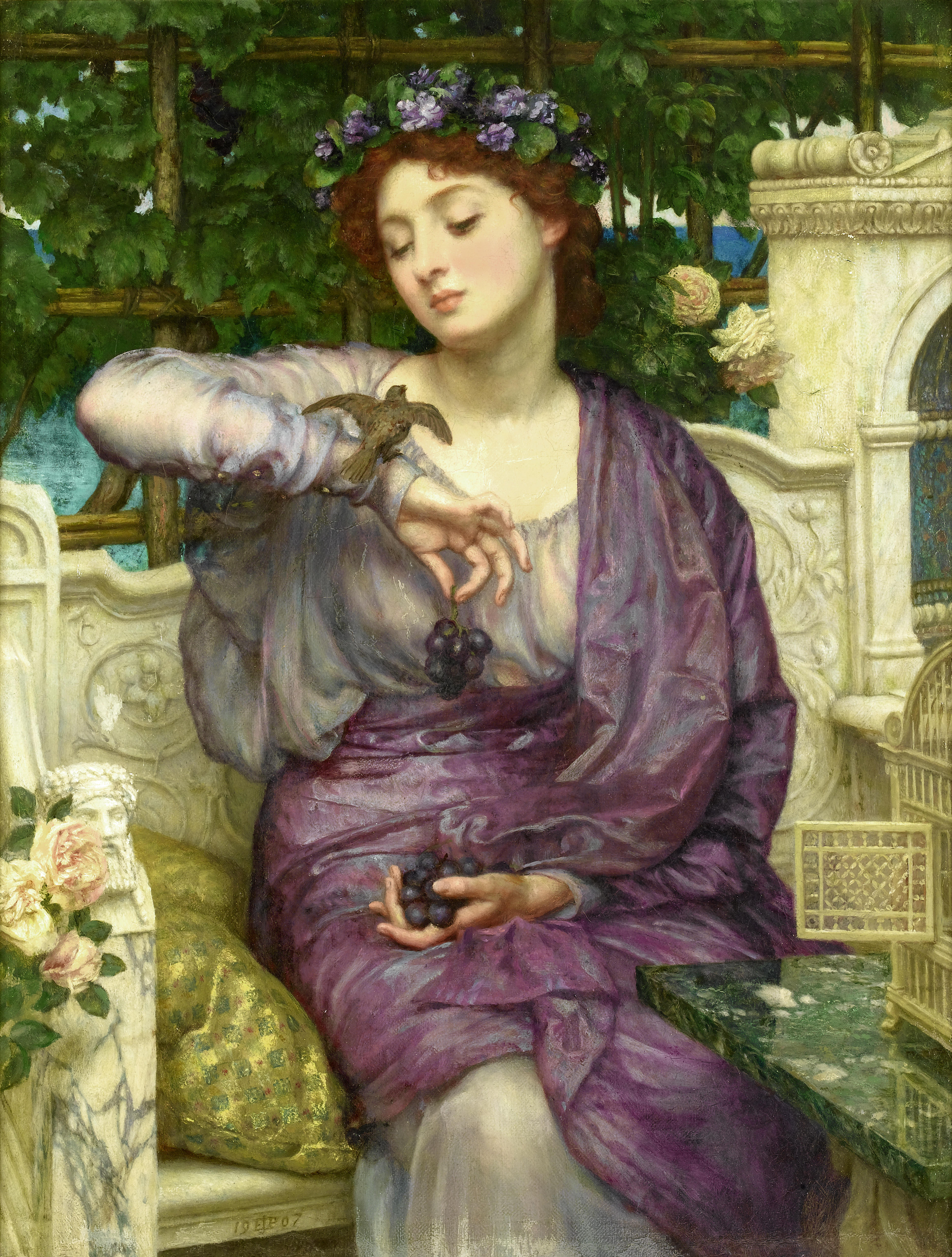
An imaginary depiction of Lesbia and her sparrow – the focus of Catullus's poems 2 and 3 – painted by Edward Poynter in 1907

In several works by the first century–BCE Roman poet Catullus, Lesbia is named as a woman with whom the poet engages in a passionate love affair. Her name is considered a pseudonym, which associated her with the Greek poetess Sappho, a native of Lesbos and a major influence on Catullus. As Catullus constructs her, Lesbia is a beautiful married woman, attractive to him both for her physical beauty and her intellectual charm. His poems include expressions of passionate desire for Lesbia, misery at her rejection and perceived betrayal of him, and bitter attacks on her and other men for her infidelity and sexual activities.

Elizabeth Marie Young calls Lesbia "an ongoing obsession" of Catullus's poetry. His portrayal of her inverts traditional Roman gender norms: she is portrayed as the more active participant in their relationship, while he often portrays himself as her powerless victim. Several aspects of her characterisation, perhaps including her name, recall tropes associated with hetaerae (high-class courtesans) in Graeco-Roman culture. Catullus's poems about her include 5 and 7, which centre around asking her for an impossibly large number of kisses; she is also taken to be the subject of poems 2 and 3, about a sparrow belonging to Catullus's beloved.

Since antiquity, "Lesbia" has been argued to have been a pseudonym for a woman named Clodia, most often Clodia Metelli, a sister of the politician and demagogue Publius Clodius Pulcher. Clodia Metelli was denigrated by the orator Cicero in the Pro Caelio, a speech in defence of her lover Marcus Caelius Rufus, and Ludwig Schwabe identified her as Lesbia in 1862 partly on the basis of the correspondences between Cicero's portrayal of her and the insults levelled at her by Catullus in his poems. Although this has remained the most common hypothesis into the twenty-first century, other scholars have suggested an identification with one of Clodius's other sisters, or with other members of the Clodian family. It has also been suggested that Catullus's depiction of Lesbia may be partly or largely fictionalised, based on literary tropes rather than biographical reality.

Receptions of Lesbia featured only occasionally in post-classical culture until the late eighteenth century, though Catullus's poems about her were influential on writers in English, Italian, Latin and French. Exceptions included the English poet Thomas Campion's 1601 air "My Sweetest Lesbia", which sanitised Catullus's desire for her, and a French romantic novel, Les Amours de Catulle ("The Loves of Catullus"), published by Jean de La Chapelle in 1680–1681. As Catullus gained greater acceptance as a canonical author from the end of the eighteenth century, Lesbia became more prominent in artistic culture, and has featured in poetry, prose, painting, sculpture and musical compositions. Catullus's poems to her were adapted, among others, by the poets William Wordsworth, Lord Byron and John Keats, and she was depicted by painters including Joshua Reynolds, Lawrence Alma-Tadema and John Reinhard Weguelin. In the twentieth and twenty-first centuries, responses to Lesbia have interrogated and reconsidered the relationship between her and Catullus, often attempting to reconstruct her psychology and voice, largely missing from Catullus's works. These include Thornton Wilder's 1948 epistolary novel The Ides of March, Dorothy Parker's satirical 1928 poem "From a Letter from Lesbia", and the 1962 choral piece Lament for a Sparrow by Alan Rawsthorne.

== In Catullus's poetry ==
=== Name ===
The name Lesbia literally means "the woman of Lesbos". The name identifies Lesbia with the ancient Greek poetess Sappho, a native of Lesbos who wrote at the end of the seventh century BCE, and whose poetry was a major influence on that of Catullus. William Fitzgerald considers the name a nod to Lesbia's educated nature. Ellen Greene argues that the association of Lesbia with Sappho, who wrote love poems towards other women and was typically portrayed as masculine in Latin poetry, played a part in Catullus's characterisation of Lesbia as cruel, unfaithful and domineering, and of himself as subordinate and playing a traditionally feminine role. She further argues that Catullus blurs the distinction between Lesbia and Sappho, such that his depictions of the effects of his desire for Lesbia can be read as equally invoking the effect of his reading of Sappho's verse. For John W. Zarker, the choice of the name "Lesbia" indicates Lesbia's literary interest and ability, and underscores the fundamentally intellectual (rather than physical) basis of Catullus's attraction to her.

=== Characterisation ===
You ask how many of your mega-kisses
Would more than satisfy me, Lesbia.
Great as the sum of Libyssan sand lying
In silphiophorous Cyrene
From the oracle of torrid Jove
To old Battus' Holy Sepulchre,
Or many as the stars, when night is silent,
That watch the stolen loves of humans—
To kiss you just so many kisses
Would more than satisfy mad Catullus;
The inquisitive couldn't count them all
Nor evil tongue bring them bad luck.

Quaeris, quot mihi basiationes
tuae, Lesbia, sint satis superque.
quam magnus numerus Libyssae harenae
lasarpiciferis iacet Cyrenis
oraclum Iovis inter aestuosi
et Batti veteris sacrum sepulcrum;
aut quam sidera multa, cum tacet nox,
furtivos hominum vident amores:
tam te basia multa basiare
vesano satis et super Catullo est,
quae nec pernumerare curiosi
possint nec mala fascinare lingua

— Catullus 7, translated by Guy Lee from the original Latin

Elizabeth Marie Young calls Lesbia "an ongoing obsession" of Catullus's poetry; Catullus's poems to her outnumber any known corpus addressed to a single lover by any earlier poet. (Note: Oade 2024, p. 42 (with the caveat that many works by earlier poets are no longer extant).) Andrea Harbach and Ton Tromp describe her as "arguably one of the most alluring literary characters from antiquity".

Catullus portrays Lesbia as being married; in poem 68, he describes her as coming to him from her husband's bed, and he depicts her in poem 83 as insulting him in front of her husband. (Note: The Latin word Catullus uses is vir, 'man', which can also refer to the partner of a prostitute.) Catullus offers no direct description of her appearance, though he calls her physically beautiful. H. D. Rankin argues that the unfavourable contrast he draws in poems 43 and 86 between Lesbia and two other women indicate that he conceived of her as having a well-proportioned body, dark eyes, elegant feet, and a well-formed mouth and nose, though he also suggests that Catullus's description was intended to convey Lesbia's spiritual beauty rather than to be a literal physical description. Similarly, Fitzgerald reads poem 86, which compares a woman named Quintia negatively to Lesbia in that the former possesses neither venustas ('charm') nor sal ('wit'; literally, 'salt'), as marking Lesbia out as possessing particular urbanitas: urbane, educated charm. Julia T. Dyson writes that Catullus was the first author to depict a heterosexual relationship as a "meeting of minds" between social and intellectual equals. Catullus's poetry contains nothing that can securely be attributed to Lesbia's voice, (Note: Judith P. Hallett suggests that at least two passages of Catullus's poetry (the fragmentary poem 2b and the final stanza of poem 51, where the speaker may be considered uncertain, may be interpreted as Lesbia's words.) only indirect reports of her words in the poet's, and offers little attempt to portray her psychology or mental state: William S. Anderson has called this "a central clue" as to why the relationship failed, while Harbach and Tromp see it as an assertion of Lesbia's "enigmatic independence" from Catullus, which is itself part of her allure.

The poet and scholar Raoul Schrott sees Lesbia as a symbol of the self-awareness of Roman women in the first half of the first century BCE, and Catullus's depiction of their relationship as a means of defining romantic "passion", for which no specific word existed in Latin. He argues that Catullus seeks to give the concept value and legitimacy by casting it as a form of foedus (legal and moral pact), rather than as furor (destructive madness), as which the poet Virgil, Catullus's contemporary, defines it. (Note: Preface to Schrott 1999, cited in Ziolkowski 2020, pp. 124–126) Catullus frequently applies language to his relationship with Lesbia more usually found in the spheres of political and aristocratic deal-making and obligations. Young compares Lesbia with the character Pamphilia who appears in a surviving poem of Valerius Aedituus, a Roman poet who may have written around 150 BCE, in that both are female objects of desire where most previous Graeco-Roman love poets had focused on homoerotic relationships, and that both have names which connect them to love or love poetry. (Note: "Pamphilia" is close to the Ancient Greek words πᾶν (pan, 'all') and φιλία (philia, 'love'); Young loosely translates it as "The Total Lady-Lover".)

Stephen Harrison draws parallels between Catullus's portrayal of Lesbia and that of the hetaera (high-class courtesan) Thaïs, the lover of Ptolemy I Soter of Egypt, in a play by the fourth-century BCE Athenian comic playwright Menander. Niklas Holzberg similarly suggests that Catullus's portrayal of Lesbia follows the tropes of the stock character of the hetaera in Hellenistic (323–30 BCE) comedy and later Latin love elegy. In later Roman poetry, such as that of Horace and Martial, "Lesbia" is a stock name for a hetaera, and carries connotations of erotic skill, with which the women of Lesbos were associated. (Note: Holzberg 2013, p. 31, citing Horace, Epodes 12.17 and Martial, 2.50.) In Greek, the name had been used since the fifth century BCE, in its literal meaning of "woman from Lesbos", as a term for a sexually active and shameless woman. Holzberg states that it would specifically lead Roman audiences to identify Lesbia as a fellatrix; a woman performing fellatio, considered deviant in ancient Rome. Indeed, the Greek verb lesbiazein, cognate with the name Lesbia, meant "to perform fellatio", and Shane Hawkins suggests that a possible allusion to the playwright Euripides in Catullus's poem 60 would have portrayed Lesbia as a fellatrix. Catullus frequently uses the word puella (lit. 'girl') to refer to Lesbia. This word could have various connotations in Latin: it could indicate youth, be used neutrally as "girlfriend", or carry a pejorative meaning as "prostitute". Christopher Nappa, despite considering that Catullus's Lesbia is not literally a prostitute, writes that Catullus establishes her as one of the bellae puellae (lit. 'beautiful girls'), mostly prostitutes, who refuse the romantic attentions of the malodorous Rufus in poem 69. Maria Marsilio considers the unnamed woman described in poem 37 as playing host in a salax taberna ("randy inn") to be Lesbia, and Catullus's characterisation of her to draw on tropes associated with Roman pantomime. (Note: Marsilio 2016, pp. 203–204. For the translation of salax taberna, see Lee (ed.) 2008, pp. 38–39.)

=== Relationship with Catullus ===
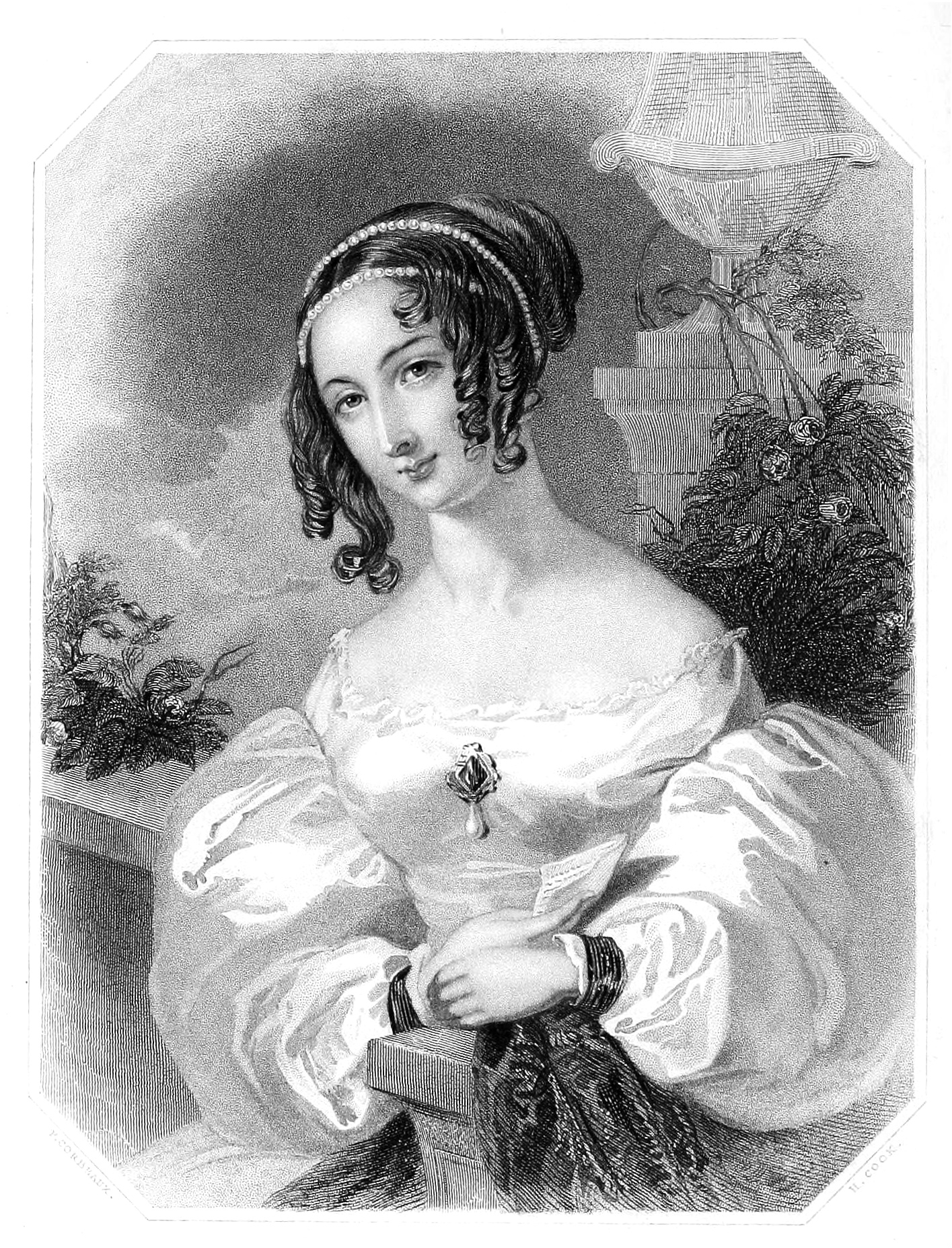
Lesbia, by the English artist Fanny Corbaux, printed to illustrate the poet Lord Byron's "To Lesbia"

Catullus unfolds his literary relationship with Lesbia in a poetic cycle, a series of short poems which develop the story of the affair in stages. This technique was inspired by the Greek poet Meleager, Catullus's approximate contemporary, and elsewhere used by Catullus for his relationship with a young man he names as Juventius. Dyson describes the Lesbia cycle as the "dramatic core" of Catullus's work, and as "giving meaning and coherence to the whole". Lesbia is named in thirteen of Catullus's poems, (Note: These are poems 5, 7, 43, 51, 58, 72, 75, 79, 83, 86, 87, 92, and 107.) and scholars have interpreted at least twelve more, which do not name her directly, as referring to her. (Note: For instance, Helen Dettmer treats the mea puella ('my girl') mentioned in poems 13 and 36 as Lesbia, while Maxine Lewis does the same for the owner of the sparrow that forms the subject of poems 2 and 3, and the unnamed puella that is the focus of poem 8.) Geoffrey Hutchinson considers that the strong association in the poems between Lesbia and Catullus's desire would draw readers to assume that any unnamed woman similarly portrayed as being desired by Catullus would be likely to be her.

Catullus's liber (lit. 'book'), or single-volume published opus, divides into three consecutive parts: the polymetrics (shorter poems in a variety of metres), eight longer poems (the carmina maiora) themed around marriage, and the epigrams (short poems, often obscene or abusive ones in iambic metres). Within this, Catullus presents, out of chronological order, a narrative of a relationship in which his love for Lesbia awakens, turns into extreme passion, is broken by rejection and betrayal, (Note: Micaela Janan notes that it is unclear whether Catullus's poetry conceives of one breakup, or several, in his relationship with Lesbia.) and which involves at least one episode of reconciliation. Lesbia is named as the object of poem 51, largely a translation of an earlier work by Sappho, considered among Catullus's earliest writings. Kenneth Quinn suggests that Catullus invented the name for this poem, and that the latter was the first poem he showed to Lesbia, intended as a "feeler" to gauge the possibility of a romantic relationship between the two. T. P. Wiseman dates two of the Lesbia poems, 36 and 11, respectively to after 56 BCE and to the second half of 55 BCE or later. Based on the identification of Lesbia with Clodia Metelli, Rankin suggests that their relationship began at some point before 61 BCE, reached "a high point of intensity" around that year, and thereafter settled into a pattern of "alternations of hatred and passionate love" until Catullus's death around 54 BCE. In the late nineteenth and early twentieth century, it was common for editions of Catullus's poetry to re-order the Lesbia poems into what the editor considered the "biographical" chronology of the relationship.

Catullus's depiction of his relationship with Lesbia involves extreme swings of contradictory emotion. Poems 5 and 7 exuberantly express his desire for Lesbia, through the conceit of asking how many kisses with her will satisfy him. In several poems, including 68b, she is explicitly or implicitly compared with goddesses, particularly Juno and Cybele. In poem 67, Wiseman reads Catullus's depiction of Ariadne, who is abandoned on the island of Naxos by the hero Theseus, as "Catullus himself with very little disguise", and therefore as drawing parallels between Theseus and Lesbia. Poem 68 additionally compares her with the god Jupiter, connecting the two via Jupiter's numerous extramarital affairs. In poem 11, Catullus complains of Lesbia's infidelity, and upbraids himself for continuing to feel desire for her. He calls on his friends, Furius and Aurelius, to deliver an insulting message to Lesbia, whom he portrays, invoking Roman stereotypes of female sexual incontinence, as maintaining three hundred adulterous lovers. Poem 70 turns an apparent expression of fidelity from Catullus's lover, who can be inferred to be Lesbia, into a general complaint that women's words cannot be trusted. Dyson observes a contrast in the portrayal of Lesbia between the polymetric and iambic poems: where the polymetrics' varied depictions of Lesbia are united by what Dyson calls "wildly indulgent sensuality", the iambics present a more abstracted view of her dominated by the metaphors of marriage and political alliance.

Lesbia is the only named woman portrayed as an object of Catullus's desire in his poetry. Catullus's presentation of Lesbia and himself inverts his usual portrayal of male and female sexuality: his own sexual emotion is more heavily emphasised than his sexual action in his poems on their relationship, while the reverse is true of Lesbia. In poem 72, he claims to have loved Lesbia like a father loves a child. (Note: Lewis 2018, p. 144, citing Catullus 72.3–4.) In 1995, Fitzgerald wrote that it had become "a commonplace of Catullan criticism that Lesbia was unable to comprehend Catullus's conception of love". Sharon Lynn James wrote in 2003 that "a reading from Lesbia's perspective might well argue that she surely understood it – she just didn't share it".

== Identity ==
Lesbia (1872) by the French painter Louis Hector Leroux

The Roman poet Ovid, in his Tristia (published in parts between 9 and 12 CE), wrote that Catullus used falsum nomen Lesbia ("the false name 'Lesbia'") and confessed to being an adulterer. (Note: Lewis 2018, p. 130, n. 11, citing Ovid, Tristia 2.427–430.) In 158 or 159 CE, the north African Latin-language writer Apuleius invoked Lesbia in his Apologia, a courtroom speech in which he defended himself against the charge of using magic. Apuleius, having been accused of using pseudonyms to hide the identity of boys addressed in his love poems, states that earlier poets did the same with the objects of their desires: he asserts that Catullus used the name Lesbia for a woman named Clodia. (Note: Gale 2021, p. 30, citing Apuleius, Apology 10.) T. P. Wiseman suggests that he may have acquired this identification from an earlier source, such as the biographer Suetonius's De Poetis ("On the Poets"), dated around the turn of the second century CE, or from an older work in the same genre by Gaius Julius Hyginus, who came to Rome around 47 BCE.

The identification of Lesbia as a woman named Clodia was known to the Venetian nobleman Marino Sanuto the Younger, who mentioned it in an account of a journey near Catullus's native Sirmio in 1483. The French humanist Marcus Antonius Muretus wrote in 1552 that Lesbia was one of the three women, all named Clodia, (Note: In Roman naming conventions, aristocratic women were named by the feminine form of their nomen gentilicum, or family name. Accordingly, all of the women in the same family shared a name.) who were sisters of Publius Clodius Pulcher, a politician and demagogue prominent in the 50s BCE. Dyson argues that it is "nearly certain" that this identification is correct. In poem 79, Catullus writes of "Lesbius" (the masculine form of Lesbia, as Clodius is the masculine form of Clodia) as being pulcher ("beautiful"), echoing Clodius's cognomen.

In 1955, R. G. C. Levens wrote of the dangers of "biographical criticism", in which circular arguments were adduced for the identity of historical individuals with characters in Catullus's poetry, which became themselves reinforced by "knowledge" about those individuals based on their supposed portrayal in the poems. Fitzgerald wrote in 1995 that "few would now claim that the Lesbia poems reflect the history of a real love affair". In 1973, Colin McLeod argued that most of Catullus's poems should be read as (often parodic) fictions, albeit fictions which may have made use of real people in the telling. Although McLeod exempts the Lesbia poems from this, Fitzgerald argues that Catullus's poetic relationship with her cannot be separated from his expressions of desire towards male lovers in other poems which McLeod includes among these parodic fictions. Holzberg argues that "we cannot entirely rule out the possibility that there was a woman who in some measure inspired Catullus in his creation of Lesbia ... however, even if it is true, it can contribute nothing to our understanding of the Lesbia poems." Holzberg sees the portrayal of Lesbia as an example of "womanufacture" – the way in which ancient literary texts construct portrayals of women out of stereotypes and generic conventions – and as fundamentally a literary construct. (Note: Holzberg 2013, pp. 29–30. For "womanufacture", see Sharrock 1991, pp. 36–37.) Young sees the Lesbia of poem 51 as representing Sappho herself, and calls this equation "a translator's act of homage ... affirming the translator's devotion to his precursor by posing him as her doting admirer". She further suggests that the name would have drawn Roman readers to associate Catullus's desire with the potentially corrupting allure of the wealthy Greek east.

=== Clodia Metelli ===
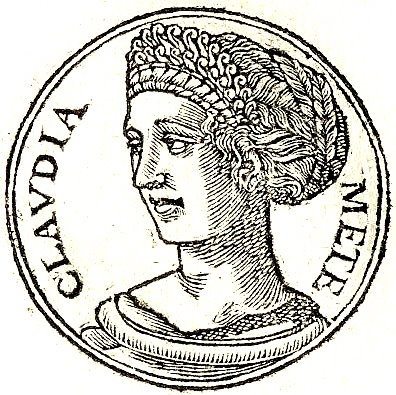
An imagined portrait of Clodia Metelli, published in Promptuarii Iconum Insigniorum by Guillaume Rouillé in 1553

Lesbia is frequently considered to have been Clodia Metelli, the eldest or second-eldest of Clodius's sisters and the wife of Quintus Caecilius Metellus Celer, (Note: On the birth order of Clodius's sisters, see Hillard 1973, esp. pp. 513–514.) who was consul (one of Rome's two chief magistrates) in 60 BCE. The identification dates at least to the sixteenth century: its first known exponent was the Italian humanist Piero Vettori, in his Variae lectiones ("Various Readings") of 1553. Other sixteenth-century scholars to endorse it included Marc-Antoine Muret in France and Aquiles Estaço in Portugal.

Moriz Haupt revived the identification of Clodia Metelli as Lesbia in a work of 1841. (Note: Haupt 1841, p. 8, cited by Schwabe 1862, p. 56. Haupt names Lesbia as "Clodia Quadrantaria", referencing a nickname of Clodia Metelli's reported by the Greek author Plutarch.) Ludwig Schwabe, as part of a wider attempt to reconstruct Catullus's biography, argued for it in his Quaestiones Catullianae ("Catullan Questions") of 1862. Schwabe connected Catullus's portrayal of Lesbia to Clodia's unhappy relationship with her husband, and her reputation for adultery, both of which were claimed by the advocate Cicero, who castigated Clodia's character in his defence speech (the Pro Caelio) for her ex-lover Marcus Caelius Rufus in a court case of April 56 BCE. Holzberg calls the traditional biographical narrative of Catullus's life, into which Schwabe's reconstruction of the relationship is set, the "Catullus Romance". Dyson defends Schwabe's equation of Lesbia with Clodia Metelli by the references in Catullus's poems to "Caelius" and "Rufus" as lovers (or the same lover) of Lesbia, which she considers to refer to Marcus Caelius Rufus. Hawkins further suggests that the first and last letters of the lines of poem 60 formed an acrostic and telestic reading natu ceu aes ("by birth like bronze"), which he takes to be a pun on the name Metellus, via the similar-sounding Latin word metallum ('mine', and in later Latin 'metal').

Since the name Lesbia is metrically equivalent to Clodia (both consisting of a dactyl: a "heavy" syllable followed by two "light" ones), knowledgeable readers of Catullus's poems could have replaced one with the other. If the identification of Lesbia with Clodia Metelli is correct, she would have been several years older than Catullus. (Note: Catullus is considered to have been born around 84 BCE, while Clodia Metelli was probably born before 90 BCE.) Schwabe considered that the relationship between Catullus and Clodia began in 61– 60 BCE, and ended, first temporarily and then (after a brief reconciliation) permanently, in 59–58 BCE.

==== Challenges to the Clodia Metelli hypothesis ====
While Clodia Metelli remains the favoured candidate for Lesbia in the twenty-first century, several scholars have opposed the identification as incompatible with the dates of Catullus's poems. The Scottish schoolmaster James Cranstoun, who published a translation of Catullus's poems in 1867, argued that Schwabe's identification of Lesbia as Clodia Metelli could not be correct, on the grounds that poems discussing Catullus's relationship with her, such as 11 and 43, must date to after Julius Caesar took up his Gallic command in 58 BCE; since Metellus died in 59, Clodia could not have been the married Lesbia. (Note: Poem 11 refers to the "monuments of great Caesar" (Caesaris monimenta magni) in the Alps, between Italy and Gaul.) Max Rothstein, in 1923, similarly argued that the association with Clodia Metelli was unsound, arguing that the dates of the Lesbia poems, which he considered to fall between 56 and 54 BCE, were incompatible with that of Metellus's death in 59 BCE. Wiseman similarly dates Catullus's oeuvre to the mid-50s BCE, and poem 36, set during a love affair, to the third quarter of 56 BCE; Clodia Metelli, according to Cicero in the Pro Caelio, remained unmarried at least until April 56, while Catullus always presents Lesbia as being married to another man.

Wiseman argues that the equation between Marcus Caelius Rufus and Catullus's "Rufus" is unsound, in part because Caelius Rufus was known as an elegant man and an excellent dancer, while Catullus's Rufus is described as having bad body odour and suffering from gout. Monica Gale further points out that Catullus, in poem 100, lists Caelius among the "flower of Veronese youth", while Cicero gives Caelius Rufus's native town as Interamnia Praetutiana in central Italy. Wiseman instead suggests that Catullus's Rufus may have been Quintus Pompeius Rufus or Quintus Numerius Rufus, both associates of Clodius, or one of many other noblemen by that cognomen known to have been active in Catullus's lifetime. Wilfried Stroh, writing on the Pro Caelio, argues that the relationship between Caelius Rufus and Clodia may have been invented by Cicero to suit his case, and consequently that Catullus's poems cannot securely be said to relate to the affair, since the identification of Cicero's Caelius and Catullus's Rufus hinges on the Pro Caelio.

=== Others ===
Massimo Lenchantin de Gubernatis, in his 1943 edition of Catullus, maintained that Lesbia must be one of the three sisters of Clodius Pulcher, but avoided giving a firm conclusion as to which one she was. Rothstein suggested that Clodia Metelli's younger sister, Clodia Luculli, was equally known for sexual promiscuity, Giacomo Giri argued in 1922 that Lesbia was most likely an otherwise unknown member of a minor branch of the Clodian family. (Note: Giri 1922, cited in Levens 1955, p. 285.) Wiseman wrote in 1974 that Clodia Luculli was the most likely candidate for Lesbia, and raised Clodia Tertia, the middle of the three sisters, as an alternative possibility. In 1979, Wilfried Stroh suggested that she may have been a former slave of the Clodian family, who would have taken the name "Clodia" on manumission. (Note: Stroh 1979, p. 332, n. 35, cited in Schmidt 1985, p. 103.)

John T. Ramsay, in an unpublished comment made to his fellow classicist J. Morgan in 2007, suggested that Lesbia was more likely one of the two daughters of Appius Claudius Pulcher, Clodius's elder brother. Morgan made this case on the grounds that Lesbia is portrayed by Catullus as a young bride. (Note: Hutchinson cites poems 2, 3 and 72 in support of this idea.). Wiseman endorsed this view in 2022, suggesting that the "Lesbius is pulcher" line of poem 79 may refer to Appius Claudius's nephew, adopted as a son, who used Pulcher as a praenomen (first name) to distinguish himself from his adopted brother.

== Reception ==
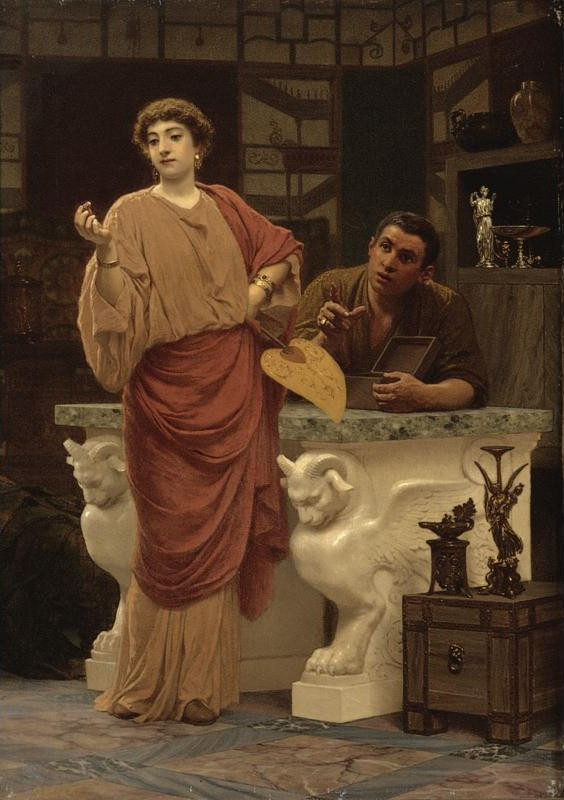
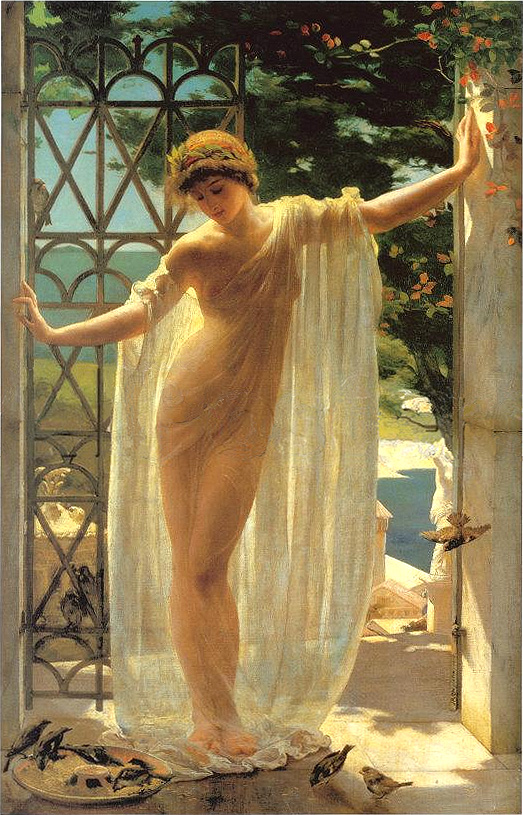
Little Luxury by Stefan Bakałowicz (left) and Lesbia (1878) by John Reinhard Weguelin. Harbach and Tromp describe these two images as showing the poles of nineteenth-century depictions of Lesbia, from Weguelin's erotic painting to Bakałowicz's "distant" portrayal.

The works of Catullus were known until the fifth century CE, but almost completely unknown from the sixth to the twelfth century. (Note: Tarrant 1983, p. 43. Berthold Ullman considers several medieval and late antique works to contain possible allusions to Catullus's poems, but finds few secure examples from the sixth century to the thirteenth.) They were rediscovered in a manuscript around 1305, and copies were made throughout the fourteenth and fifteenth centuries. A Renaissance manuscript of Catullus's works, possibly the copy owned by the poet Petrarch before 1375, included a marginal note incorrectly explaining that "Lesbia" meant "one who drinks at great expense", (Note: Wiseman 1985, p. 211: Lesbia damnose bibens interpretatur. On the identity of Petrarch's manuscript, see Thompson 1978, p. 28.) itself sourced from an eleventh-century dictionary by the Italian Papias. Micaela Janan writes that Lesbia "has been reified not only as the source of all Catullus’s woes but as a symptom of all the Late Roman Republic’s ills: greed, aristocratic pride, deception, and profligacy". Elena Theodorakopoulos argues that post-classical written portrayals of Lesbia, both in literature and criticism, generally create sympathy for Catullus at Lesbia's expense.

Latin editions of Catullus first arrived in Britain in the late fifteenth or early sixteenth century. Although Catullus's work was highly influential on poets writing in Italian, French, Latin and English in the seventeenth and eighteenth centuries, Lesbia herself attracted little interest during this period. A romantic novel, Les Amours de Catulle ("The Loves of Catullus"), was published in French by Jean de La Chapelle in 1680–1681, and anonymously translated into English in 1707; (Note: Wiseman 1985, p. 212. On Les Amours de Catulle, see Pursglove 2000, p. 239. On the reception of the poems in Latin-language verse, see Moul 2017, p. 5.) Wiseman remarks that it was unusual for its time in taking an interest in the relationship between Catullus and Lesbia, rather than simply in his poetry. Lesbia became increasingly popular as a subject from the late eighteenth century, corresponding with the increased acceptance of Catullus as a canonical Latin author.

In January 1801, at a lunch party at Sirmio to celebrate the taking of Peschiera del Garda during the War of the Second Coalition, the French general Jean-Pierre Lacombe-Saint-Michel gave an extemporised toast in which he claimed to be able to see plus d’une Lesbie ("more than one Lesbia") among the women present. Wiseman cites this as a notable exception to the general neglect of Lesbia in the culture of the period. Henry Stead writes that during the late seventeenth and early eighteenth centuries, when Catullus was considered an obscure poet in Britain, he was known there almost entirely for his relationship with Lesbia, and via translations of his poems about Lesbia's sparrow (2–3) and his "kiss poems" addressed to her (5 and 7).

=== In literature ===
==== Poetry ====
Then come, with whom alone I live,
A thousand kisses take and give,
Another thousand, to the store
Add hundreds, then a thousand more!
And when they to a million mount
Let Confusion take th’account—
That you (the number never knowing)
May continue still bestowing;
That I for joys may never pine
That never can again be mine.

— From William Wordsworth's "To Lesbia"

Although Catullus's "sparrow" poems (2 and 3) and his "kiss poems" (5 and 7) were highly influential on Italian, French and English verse of the sixteenth and seventeenth centuries, and widely imitated in Neo-Latin verse, Lesbia herself attracted little attention from poets. An exception was a 1539 poem by the Italian humanist and poet Marcantonio Flaminio, which mentioned Lesbia in connection with Catullus and Sirmio. (Note: Wiseman 1985, p. 212. The work is Carmina 4.1.) She is absent from the English writer Algernon Charles Swinburne's 1866 poem Dolores, which drew heavily on Catullus to depict a sinister sexual goddess but avoided mention of or allusion to Lesbia.

The sixteenth-century Dutch poet Joannes Secundus drew on Catullus's work in his collection Basia ("Kisses"), published around 1534–1536 and considered by Julia Haig Gaisser as "the most important Catullan poetry of the Renaissance". The sixteenth poem in Secundus's cycle asks his lover, Neaera, to give him "a hundred kisses ... as many kisses, as Lesbia gave / to the poet who wanted many". In 1795, the English poet Walter Savage Landor included several versions of Catullan poems in his first poetry collection; Stead credits Catullus as "one of Landor's first and undoubtedly his strongest" poetic influence. These included imitations of poems 2, 3, 5 and 7. In his verse preface to his 1821 translation of Catullus, the English poet and politician George Lamb imagines Catullus lying at Lesbia's side in Elysium, the home of the blessed dead in Graeco-Roman mythology.

William Wordsworth wrote an imitation of Catullus's poem 5, "To Lesbia", published by his friend Samuel Taylor Coleridge in The Morning Post in 1798. (Note: Stead 2016, p. 166. The poem appeared, as "Lines Imitated from Catullus" and under the pseudonym "Mortimer", in the edition of 11 April 1798.) Stead suggests that Wordsworth would have become familiar with Catullus's poetry while at school, and that he uses dramatic irony in foreshadowing the end of Catullus and Lesbia's relationship at the end of "To Lesbia". He also wrote a poem in 1786/7 in imitation of Catullus's poem 3, "The Death of a Starling". Wordsworth attached the epigraph sunt lacrimae rerum ("there is weeping for [the sadness of] things") to the poem, and Stead suggests that it responded to the death of Wordsworth's mother in 1778. Lord Byron wrote "To Lesbia" in his Fugitive Pieces of 1806 for Julia Leacroft, a girl from Southwell with whom he had had a flirtatious relationship, changing the title from "To Julia" to protect its subject's anonymity. (Note: Marchand 1957, pp. 116–117, 122. For the date of Fugitive Pieces, see Levy 2020, p. 144.) He later drew heavily on Catullus's Lesbia poems in an unpublished lament, written in Latin elegiac couplets, for John Edleston, a Cambridge choirboy and object of Byron's desire who died in 1811. (Note: Stead 2016, pp. 200–202. On Edleston, see Beaton 2013, p. 27.) John Keats alludes to Catullus's Lesbia poems in his portrayal of the goddess Diana, who appears to the title character in Book 1 of his 1818 poem Endymion. (Note: Stead 2016, pp. 279–280, citing Endymion 1.651–660.) Elsewhere, in his unpublished poem "Think" (written around 11 November 1817), Keats alludes to Catullus 3 in a verse conceived of as comforting the poet's beloved on the death of a pet. A translation of Catullus 101, on the death of the poet's brother, by the late nineteenth–century writer Aubrey Beardsley rendered the Latin fortuna as "She who now bestows and now denies"; Fitzgerald suggests that this creates an association between the concept (or goddess) and Lesbia.

In 1913, the British poet and critic Arthur Symons published a poem, "Lesbia in Old Age", which imagines an aged Lesbia reminiscing about the now-dead Catullus and asking his pity. The British writer C. H. Sisson's 1974 poem "Catullus" associates the poet with Christ, while describing Lesbia, with what Fitzgerald calls "an unhealthy dose of misogyny", as "resolved ... into splayed legs / and lubricity in the most popular places". Other poetic treatments attach greater agency to Lesbia. The American poet Dorothy Parker's satirical 1928 work "From a Letter from Lesbia" imagines Lesbia writing to a friend. (Note: Ziolkowski 2020, p. 101. For the poem's date, see Theodorakopoulos 2013, p. 275.) Parker's Lesbia, described by the poet and classicist Josephine Balmer as "subversive", advises her correspondent against relationships with poets, on the grounds that "all of them are queer" and turn every occasion into a poem. She writes that she "always hated birds" and found Catullus's poem on her sparrow's death (poem 3) "most unpleasant – gloomy, tedious". Elena Theodorakopoulos sees Parker's Lesbia as prefiguring the portrayal of the mythical Eurydice by Carol Ann Duffy, in that both seem to take relief from their male lover's temporary absence, and that both can be read as rebelling against their own status as what Theodorakopoulos calls "written women". (Note: Theodorakopoulos 2013, p. 275. Duffy's portrayal of Eurydice is found in her 1999 collection, The World's Wife.) The New Zealand poet Anna Jackson published a poetic series, I Clodia, in 2014, conceived as a set of poems written by Clodia Metelli. The classicist Maxine Lewis describes Jackson's decision to cast Clodia as a poet as a "powerful feminist gesture of reclamation". Several of the poems constitute responses to Catullus's Lesbia poems, taking them as an account of a real affair between Catullus and Clodia Metelli.

==== Prose ====
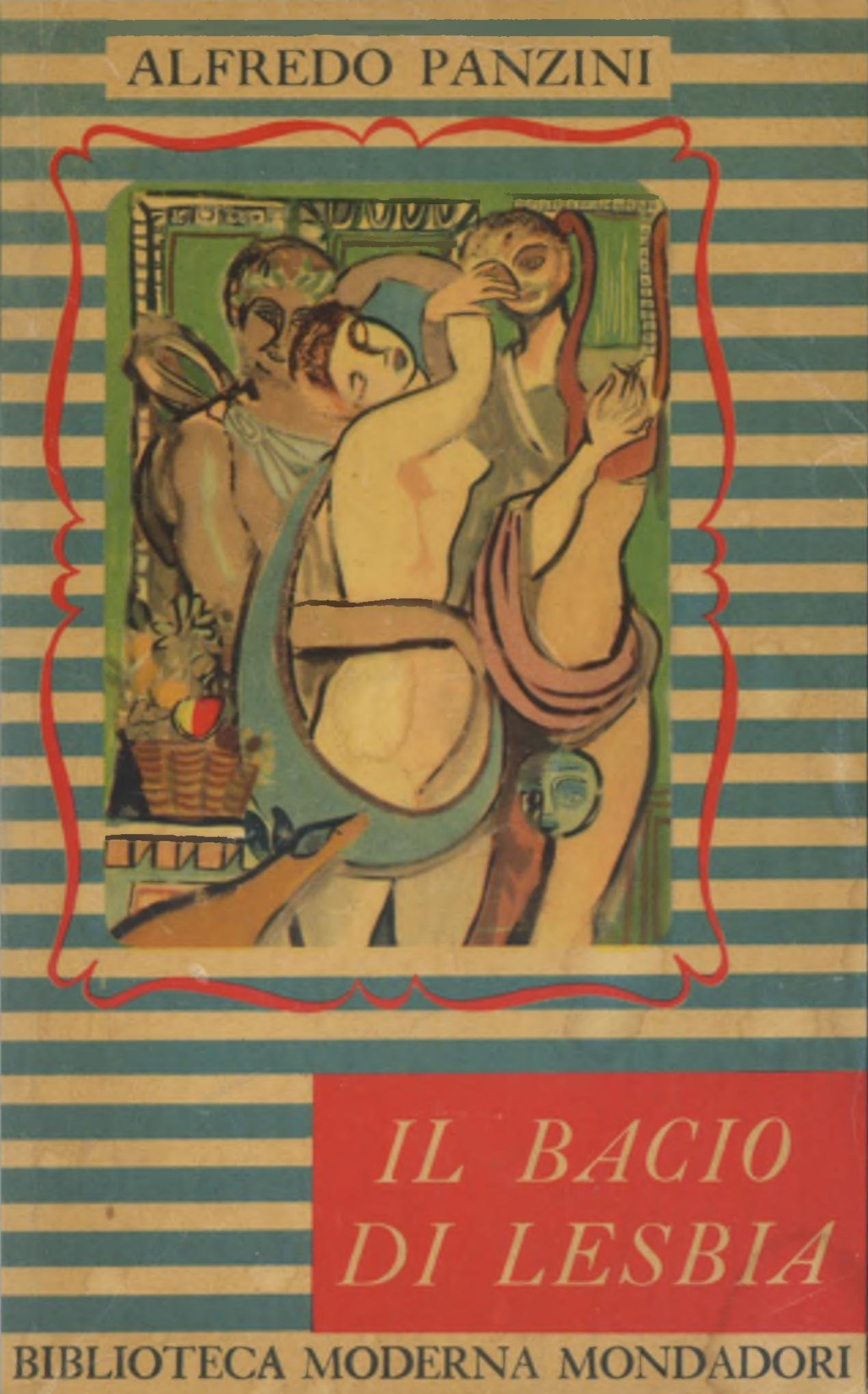
The front cover of Il bacio di Lesbia ("Lesbia's Kiss"), published by Alfredo Panzini in 1937

The Irish classical scholar Robert Yelverton Tyrrell expressed his regret, in an 1890 commentary on Cicero, that no historical romance had yet been written on the relationship between Catullus and Lesbia. Wiseman comments that the situation remained largely unchanged, at least among English-language novelists, thirty years later. The American writer A. C. E. Allinson wrote a 1913 short story, "The Estranger", which imagines Catullus's brother, named as Valerius, warning him about Lesbia's promiscuity: Catullus later finds Lesbia romantically entangled with Caelius, but decides to return to her when she calls for him, feeling that his desire for her beauty has been separated from any sense of respect for her fidelity. In 1937, the Italian novelist Alfredo Panzini published Il bacio di Lesbia ('Lesbia's Kiss'), which mixed Catullus's poems with autobiographical vignettes.

Literary treatments of Catullus and Lesbia have often taken as axiomatic the identity of Clodia Metelli as Lesbia. In his 1910 anthology Dead Letters, consisting of fictional letters written by historical and literary characters, Maurice Baring included one by the title Lesbia Illa ("That Lesbia", a quotation from Catullus's poem 58), from Clodia to Catullus. (Note: Wiseman 1985, p. 226. For Baring's letter, see Baring 1910, pp. 29–38.) Wiseman describes Baring's piece as a "tongue-in-cheek" letter, in which Catullus drunkenly interrupts a dinner party, at which Clodia, Julius Caesar and others are guests, to declaim an insulting poem about her. In Death on the Appian Way, written pseudonymously by the British MI6 officer Kenneth Benton in 1974, Catullus and Clodia have sex on a beach after he recites his poem 64, and he writes his Lesbia poems about her after she has ended their relationship in favour of Caelius. In The Venus Throw, published by the American novelist Steven Saylor in 1995, Catullus names Clodia and Clodius as Lesbia and Lesbius while drunkenly referencing allegations of incest between them; Clodia is also imagined as a lover of the Egnatius named in Catullus's poem 39 as brushing his teeth with urine. In the 1995 novel Attis, written by the historian Tom Holland and set in a twenty-first century city, Catullus and Clodia have sex in a nightclub called "Thiasos of Cybele"; she tells him, shortly after meeting him, that "sometimes [she] can be a bitch. A real bitch." Holland's Catullus publishes poems in a literary magazine whose editors believe that "there is only the poem ... in other words, Lesbia cannot exist outside the poem".

Several novelistic treatments of Lesbia have attempted to reinterpret the Catullus–Lesbia relationship against the narrative of the poems. In the American writer Thornton Wilder's 1948 epistolary novel The Ides of March, Clodia upbraids Catullus for expecting fidelity from her; she accuses him of confusing her with "that image of me lodged in your head whom I have no wish to confront". (Note: Quoted in Harbach & Tromp 2025, p. 205) In the Canadian W. G. Hardy's 1957 The City of Libertines, Clodia is portrayed, in the words of the classicist Theodore Ziolkowski, "not as a wanton but as a proud, passionate woman"; the text frequently quotes or alludes to Catullus's poems. The Key, published by Benita Kane Jaro in 1988, uses Caelius as its narrator. Jaro's Catullus participates in the ritual worship of the goddess Cybele in approximately 63 BCE, despite being warned by Julius Caesar that "she" (perhaps a reference to Cybele or to Clodia) is "not worth it"; after almost castrating himself during the ritual, Catullus rapes Clodia.

Helen Dunmore's 2008 novel Counting the Stars portrays Lesbia, identified as Clodia Metelli, as resisting a proposal from Catullus to marry him after Metellus's death, recasting the opening lines of Catullus's poem 70 as Lesbia's tactful means of resisting, in Harbach and Tromp's words, "binding herself to another husband". (Note: The lines in question are nulli se dicit mulier mea nubere malle / quam mihi non si se Iuppiter ipse petat, translated as "My beloved says that she would marry no one rather / than me, not even if Jupiter himself proposed to her.") Dunmore quotes from and alludes to Catullus's poetry throughout; Theodorakopoulos sees her novel as showing "how Catullus and Lesbia are products (and makers) of poetry, rather than historical figures". She recasts Catullus's poem 51 so that both Catullus and Clodia experience the physical effects of love, reinterpreting (in Theodorakopoulos's words) Catullus's work as depicting the merging of identities rather than his own emasculation.

=== In visual arts ===
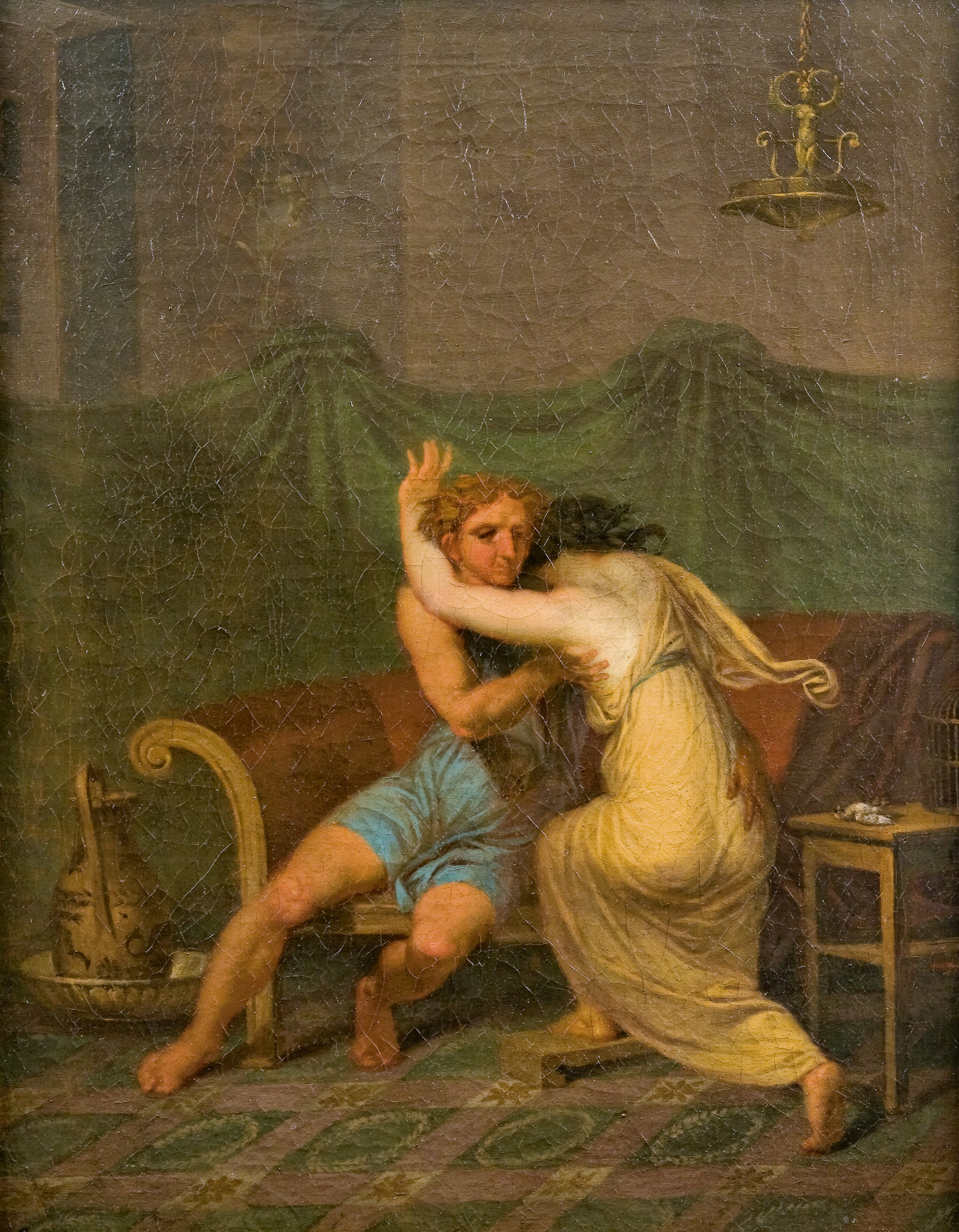
Nicolai Abildgaard's 1809 Catullus og Lesbia ("Catullus and Lesbia") depicts the poet comforting Lesbia on the death of her sparrow, which lies on the table to the viewer's right.

Lesbia is named as the subject of more than twenty works of post-classical visual art, more than any other character from Roman love elegy, and in several works of literature. Harbach and Tromp write that certain paintings, such as the nineteenth-century Little Luxury by Stefan Bakałowicz, which do not name Lesbia in their titles can be assumed to be depictions of her. Most artistic depictions of Lesbia depict her and the sparrow identified by Catullus as deliciae meae puellae ("my girl's delight") in poems 2 and 3. A version by the Swiss artist Angelica Kauffman, made before 1784, depicted Catullus as writing while Lesbia mourns her dead sparrow; the Danish painter Nicolai Abildgaard's 1809 Catullus og Lesbia ("Catullus and Lesbia") depicts her in a manner reminiscent of images of women in funerary mourning, being comforted by the poet.

The English painter Joshua Reynolds originally titled his 1786 portrait of a prepubescent girl, who plays with a bird on her right arm, "Lesbia". Although birds were often depicted in eighteenth-century art as pets for children, the erotic undertones of Catullus's poem and the expression of the girl, described by Łajkosz as "flirty looking", give the painting a sexualised undertone: it was renamed "Robinetta" (lit. 'little robin'), removing the association with Lesbia and Catullus, at some point after 1790. In British painting of the Victorian era (1837–1901), Catullus was primarily depicted through his relationship with Lesbia.

Harbach and Tromp comment that the portrayal of Lesbia in nineteenth-century art varies from erotic and sexualised depictions, such as John Reinhard Weguelin's 1878 painting Lesbia, to imagining her as a detached and emotionally indifferent character. They see this as a consequence of the ambivalence and ambiguity of Catullus's text, which allows for various interpretations and never presents Lesbia's words or perspective directly. Other eroticised depictions of Lesbia include Le Moineau de Lesbie ("Lesbia's Sparrow"), a marble statue made by the French sculptor François Truphème in the third quarter of the nineteenth century, which depicts Lesbia almost nude in the style of a classical Crouching Venus statue. The neoclassical sculpture Mädchen mit dem toten Vogel ("Girl with a Dead Bird") by Johann von Dannecker, also known as Lesbia and Her Sparrow, similarly depicts her in a similar costume to Hellenistic (323–30 BCE) depictions of Aphrodite, the ancient Greek equivalent of Venus.

The German neoclassical painter Anselm Feuerbach painted a lost Lesbia mit dem Vogel ("Lesbia with the Bird"), dated 1868; a 1904 edition of a biography of Feuerbach by Julius Allgeyer stated that he had been inspired by the 1855 German translation of Theodor Heyse. (Note: Calinski 2021, p. 54, n. 156; p. 467 (for the date). An earlier 1894 edition said that Feuerbach had been vermutlich ('probably') inspired by Heyse; this word was removed for the 1904 edition.) Calinski describes Heyse's translation as erotically toned down and "entirely harmless", (Note: Calinski 2021, p. 96: vollkommen harmlos.) and writes that Feuerbach added eroticism back into his painting by giving Lesbia's tunic an anachronistically low neckline, which revealed what Calinski calls "the most sensual décolletage he had ever brought to canvas", positioned in the centre of the composition. (Note: Calinski 2021, pp. 88–89: das sinnlichste Dekolleté, das er je auf eine Leinwand brachte.) He suggests that the eroticism of Feuerbach's painting came from his reading of Catullus's more explicit poems, as well as the influence of his lover and model Anna Risi. (Note: The face used for Lesbia mit dem Vogel was that of Lucia Brunacci, though Calinski suggests that Risi may have been the model for Lesbia's body and pose.) The nineteenth-century Belgian artist Félicien Rops made an etching, Le Moineau de Lesbie ("Lesbia's Sparrow"), purporting to be of a stone sculpture found at the Roman site of Herculaneum: it depicts a seated Lesbia leaning towards a winged phallus, (Note: It has been argued since the fifteenth century that Catullus's passer, 'sparrow', may have been intended as a double entendre for a phallus.) which Evanghélia Stead describes as ridiculing Catullus's "sparrow" poems.

The Dutch-born painter Lawrence Alma-Tadema painted two works featuring Catullus and Lesbia: 1865's Catullus at Lesbia's and 1870's Catullus Reading His Poems at Lesbia's House. The former contains several allusions to Catullus's life and poems, including a dead sparrow and the letter C for "Clodia" on the base of a woman's portrait statue. Rosemary Barrow writes that the painting is ultimately based on Catullus's poem 3, and that it "represents the Lesbia who emerges from the Catullan text: cultured, refined and liberated". It also depicts a wall-painting showing a satyr having sex with a goat, which Roksana Maria Łajkosz interprets as symbolising "Lesbia's erotic temptation". More broadly, she interprets Alma-Tadema's portrayal of Lesbia across the two paintings as invoking the domina rapax (lit. 'rapacious mistress') trope from Roman love elegy. His 1866 Lesbia and Sparrow depicts Lesbia alone with the body of her sparrow, fully covered in Roman-style clothing, and with a reserved but mournful expression. Łajkosz interprets the sparrow in Alma-Tadema's painting as symbolic of the loss of childlike innocence. Edward Poynter's 1907 Lesbia and Her Sparrow shows Lesbia teasing her sparrow with a bunch of grapes, echoing a motif from contemporary paintings such as John William Godward's The Pet Bullfinch (1890) and Poynter's own Chloe (1893). (Note: Barrow 2007, pp. 193–194. For the date of Poynter's Chloe, see Trumble 2001, p. 101.) Godward also painted one of the few post-Victorian depictions of Lesbia, in Lesbia with Her Sparrow (1916): Calinski notes that this is unusual in Godward's work as taking its inspiration from a literary theme, and that – unlike both Catullus's poem 2 and most of Godward's other paintings – it conveys lttle sexuality or sensuality.

Artistic works discussed in this section

Robinetta (1786) by Joshua Reynolds, originally titled Lesbia

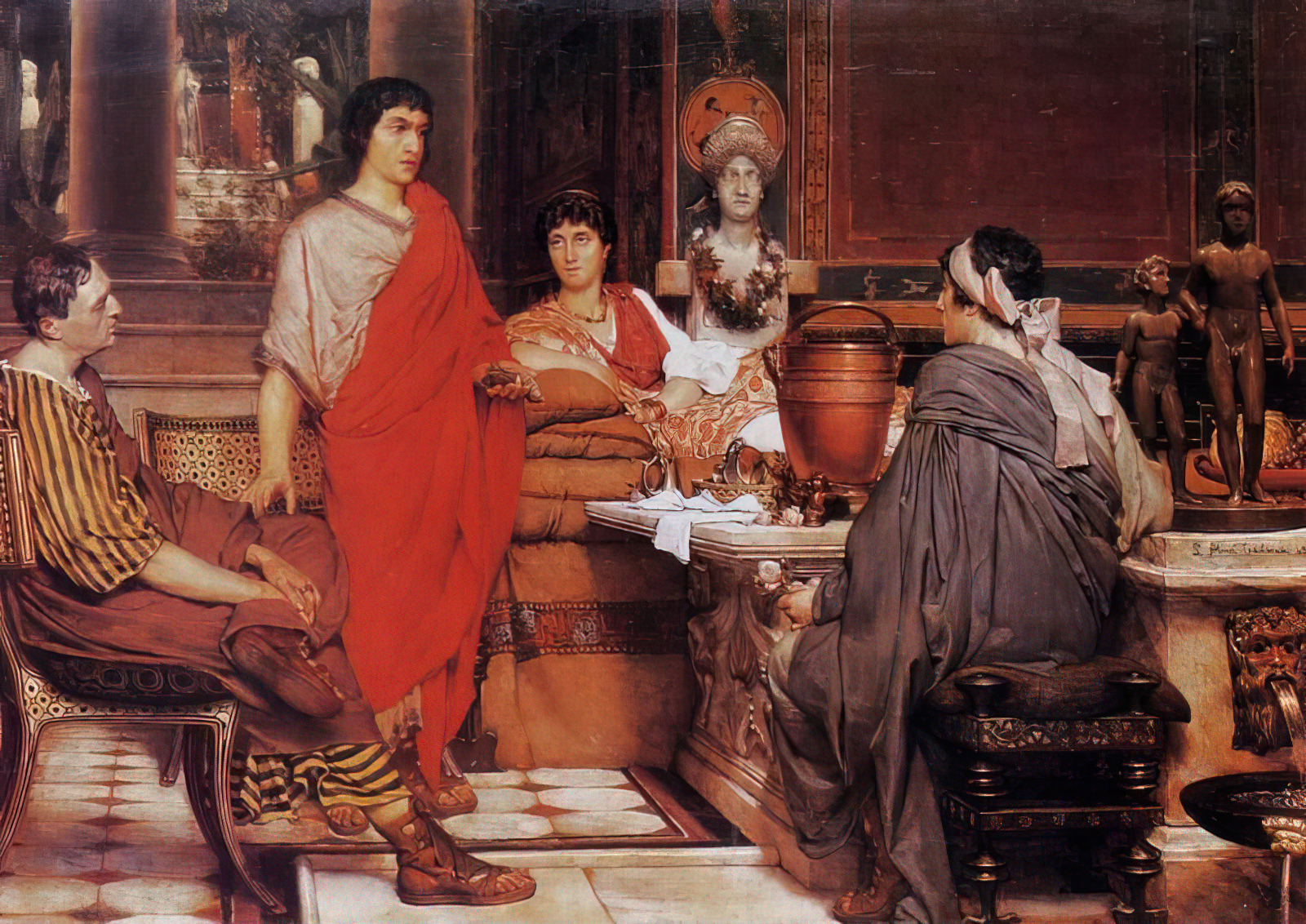
Catullus at Lesbia's (1865) by Lawrence Alma-Tadema

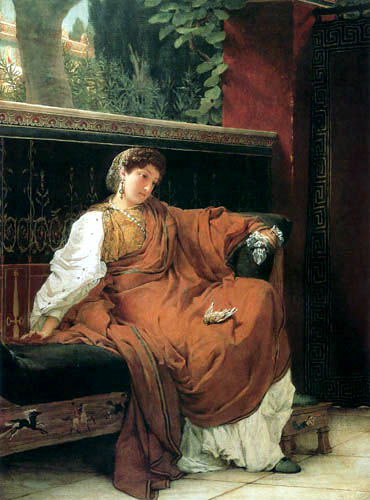
Lesbia and Sparrow (1866) by Lawrence Alma-Tadema

Anselm Feuerbach's 1866 Lesbia mit dem Vogel ("Lesbia with the Bird")

Catullus Reading His Poems at Lesbia's House (1870) by Lawrence Alma-Tadema

Le moineau de Lesbie "Lesbia's Sparrow") by Félicien Rops

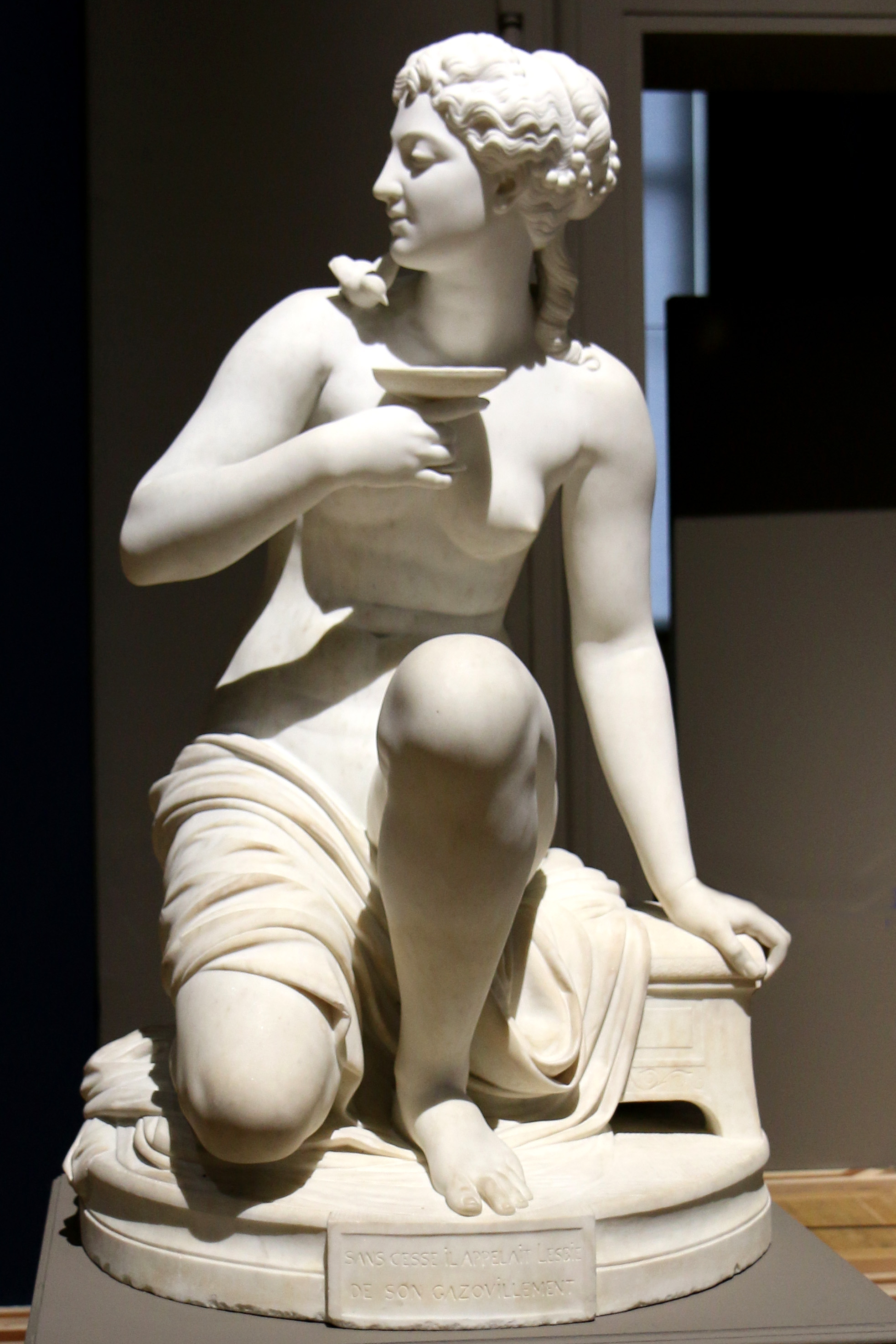
Le Moineau de Lesbie ("Lesbia's Sparrow"), by François Truphème

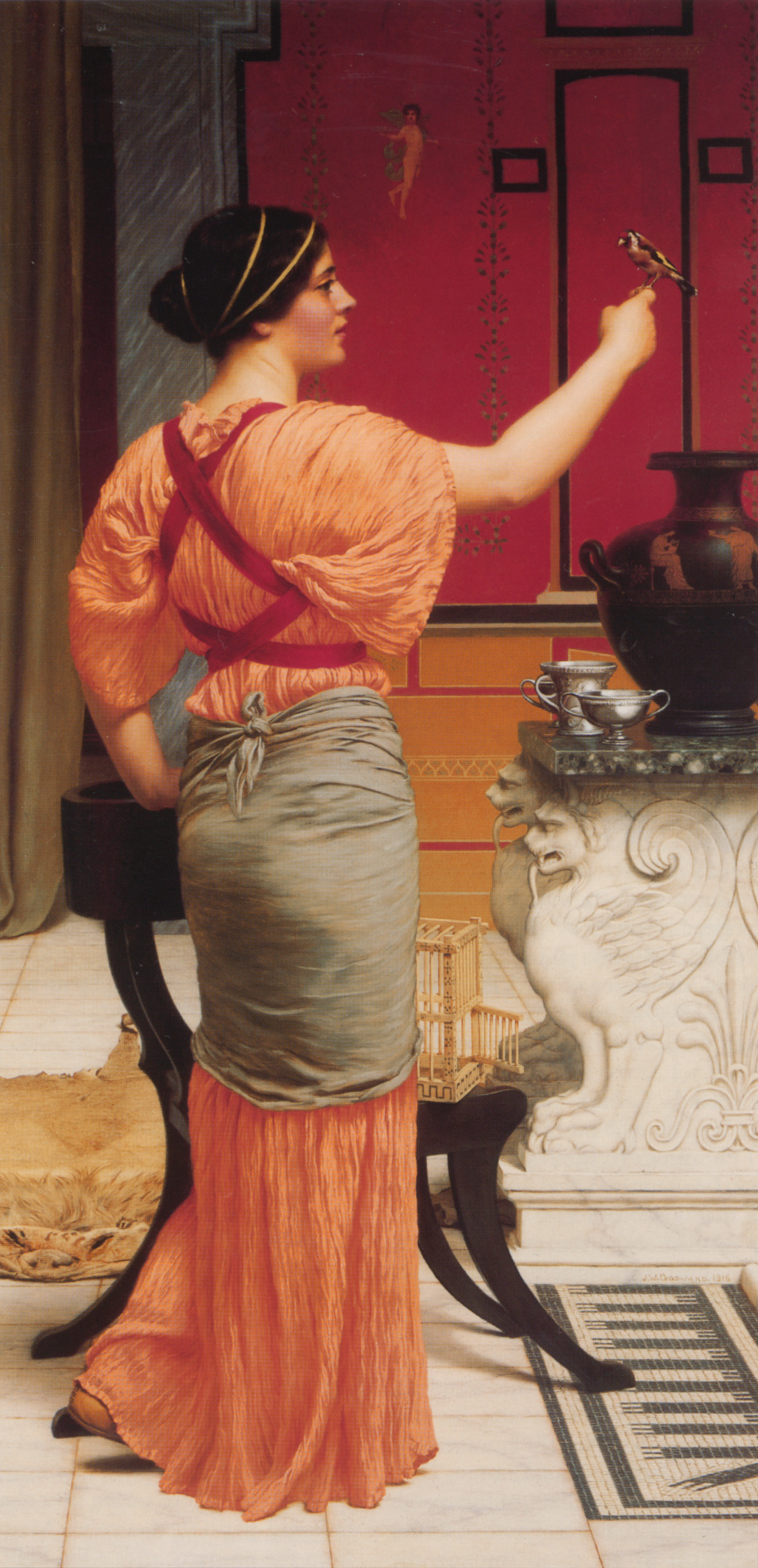
Lesbia with Her Sparrow (1916) by John William Godward

=== In music ===
Lesbia and the Sparrows (1909) by the English painter Charles Sims

Tobias Calinski traces the beginning of modern Catullan reception in music to the beginning of the sixteenth century. The Tyrolean composer Petrus Tritonius composed a setting of poem 5, published in August 1507, on the encouragement of his teacher Conrad Celtes; Calinski writes that this is the first known attempt to set Catullus's poetry to music. He further suggests that the project was probably motivated by either or both of a desire to teach the practice of scansion (analysing the metre of a poem) or to revive the classical practice by which poetry was sung rather than spoken. The Austrian organist Paul Hofhaimer included a setting of Catullus 13, in which Lesbia plays a minor role, in his posthumously published Harmoniae poeticae ("Poetic Harmonies") of 1539, though Calinski considers this choice to have been primarily driven by a desire to set a poem in the hendecasyllabic metre, and to show Hofhaimer's awareness of more obscure Catullan poems, rather than by interest in the poem's content.

The English poet Thomas Campion adapted Catullus 5 for the beginning of his air "My Sweetest Lesbia", published in 1601, though omitted Catullus's lengthy enumeration of kisses, in doing so – in Gordon Braden's phrasing – turning Catullus's "sensual, playful, and finally evanescent" love for Lesbia into an "almost saintly commitment". Campion's compatriot Ben Jonson reworked Catullus's poems 5 and 7 as a song for the title character of his comic play Volpone, first performed in 1605–1606; Volpone's song is presented as insincere, and he tries to rape its target, Celia, when it fails to charm her.

The French modernist composer Darius Milhaud set Catullus's poems 5, 70, 75 and 83, all concerning Lesbia, (Note: Lesbia is named in poems 5, 75 and 83; for poem 70 as referring to Lesbia, see e.g. Skinner 2011, p. 143.) as Quatre poèmes de Catulle ("Four Poems of Catullus") in 1923. (Note: Calinski 2021, p. 344. For the date, see Miller 2003, p. 258.) The poems were translated into French, with Lesbia's name omitted or replaced with generic terms, such as la femme que j’aime ('The woman whom I love') and ma chérie ('my darling'). The setting is for a violin and a single singing voice; the vocal part, which articulates the poet's words, is set within the range of a female soprano or a male tenor, and was sung by Vera Janacópulos in a performance of October 1923. (Note: Calinski 2021, pp. 344–346. For the possibility of a tenor singing the part, see "Review: Quatre poèmes de Catulle". Lyrica: revue de l ́art lyrique et de tous les arts (in French). 7: 960. 1927. For Janacópulos, see Wangermée (ed.) 1996, pp. 146–147.) Other twentieth-century settings of Catullus's Lesbia poems included the German Max Oberleithner's 1926 Liebeslieder des Catullus ("Love-Songs of Catullus"), which set German translations of poems 2, 5 and 7; the Italian Gian Francesco Malipiero's Passer mortuus est ("The Sparrow is Dead"), published in 1953; and the Czech Jan Novák's 1962 Passer Catulli ("Catullus's Sparrow") and 1968 Catulli Lesbia ("Catullus's Lesbia").

The German composer Carl Orff's staged cantata Catulli Carmina ("Catullus's Poems" or "Catullus's Songs") began as two song cycles, composed in two phases in 1930 and 1932; it was later expanded for publication in 1943. It traces the relationship between Catullus and Lesbia across twelve poems, sung by a choir divided into youths and old men and accompanied by an orchestra. Like Milhaud, Orff has a soprano sing Catullus's words, specifically those of poem 51. Orff rearranges Catullus's poems into a chronological account of the relationship, which ends with Catullus's repudiation of Lesbia in poem 8 before a combined setting of poems 75 and 87, which are taken to look back on the relationship after its end. Stephanie Oade writes that Orff avoids overtly characterising Lesbia, who physically appears on stage during his cantata, in line with the ambiguity of her character in Catullus's work. One of these appearances is in a dream sequence in which she embraces Caelius, added by Orff to poem 109; Orff has her sing the Italian phrase dormi ancora ("You're still sleeping") and the sound Ah.

The Swiss composer Franz Tischhauser's Amores ("Loves"), premiered in 1956, sets a selection of Catullus's poems into a narrative of his relationship with Lesbia: the piece opens with the name "Lesbia" being sung repeatedly over the playing of maracas, which Calinski reads as perhaps a reflection of Catullus's anxiety or of Lesbia's nagging. The musical setting of poem 8, titled Der Verlassene ("The Abandoned Man"), sets the line nunc iam illa non vult ("Now she no longer wants") at a rapid tempo, which Calinski reads as suggesting Lesbia's flight from him. When commissioned in 1961 by Oxford University Press to compose a short choral piece, the English composer Alan Rawsthorne chose to set Catullus 3, which he published in 1962 as Lament for a Sparrow with the subtitle "Lesbia's Sparrow". In the second section of the piece, narrating the speaker's memories of the sparrow (bars 41–66), the poem's lines are sung by female soprano and alto voices, which Oade suggests "may suggest a female persona ... of Lesbia voicing her own memories, taking them back after Catullus's appropriation of them". She further suggests that Rawsthorne's use of a choir, rather than a solo voice, allows the character of Lesbia to be universalised, and to stand for any woman in grief.

== Bibliography ==
- Adams, James Noel (1983). "Words for 'Prostitute' in Latin". Rheinisches Museum für Philologie. New Series. 126 (3/4): 321–358. JSTOR 41233491.
- Anderson, William S. (1995). "Aspects of Love in Ovid's Metamorphoses". The Classical Journal. 90 (3): 265–269. JSTOR 3297530.
- Balmer, Josephine (2013). Piecing Together the Fragments: Translating Classical Verse, Creating Contemporary Poetry. Classical Presences. Oxford University Press. ISBN 978-0-19-958509-0.
- Baring, Maurice (1910). Dead Letters. Boston and New York: Houghton Mifflin. OCLC 458623411.
- Barker, Roberta (2021). "Imaginary Invalids: The Symptom and the Stage from the Restoration to the Romantics". In Lawlor, Clark; Mangham, Andrew (eds.). Literature and Medicine: The Eighteenth Century. Cambridge University Press. pp. 70–90. doi:10.1017/9781108355476. ISBN 978-1-108-42086-0.
- Barrow, Rosemary Julia (2007). The Use of Classical Art and Literature by Victorian Painters, 1860–1912. With a Preface by Michael Liversidge. Lewiston: The Edwin Meller Press. ISBN 978-0-7734-5443-9.
- Beaton, Roderick (2013). Byron's War: Romantic Rebellion, Greek Revolution. Cambridge University Press. ISBN 978-1-107-03308-5.
- Braden, Gordon (1979). "'Vivamus, mea Lesbia' in the English Renaissance". English Literary Renaissance. 9 (2): 199–224. JSTOR 43446948.
- Calinski, Tobias (2021). Catull in Bild und Ton: Untersuchungen zur Catull-Rezeption in Malerei und Komposition [Catullus in Image and Sound: Studies on the Reception of Catullus in Painting and Composition] (in German). Darmstadt: WBG Academic. ISBN 978-3-534-40615-9.
- Dettmer, Helen (1986). "'Meros Amores': A Note on Catullus 13.9". Quaderni Urbinati di Cultura Classica. New Series. 23 (2): 87–91. JSTOR 20538929.
- Dyson, Julia T. (2007). "The Lesbia Poems". In Skinner, Marilyn B. (ed.). A Companion to Catullus. Chichester: Blackwell. pp. 254–275. doi:10.1002/9780470751565.ch14. ISBN 978-1-4051-3533-7.
- Fitzgerald, William (1995). Catullan Provocations: Lyric Poetry and the Drama of Position. Classics and Contemporary Thought. Vol. 1. Berkeley and Los Angeles: University of California Press. ISBN 0-520-20062-4.
- Fordyce, Christian James, ed. (1961). Catullus: A Commentary. Oxford University Press. OCLC 776592149.
- Gaisser, Julia Haig (2017). "Elegy". In Moul, Victoria (ed.). A Guide to Neo-Latin Literature. Cambridge University Press. pp. 113–130. doi:10.1017/9781139248914. ISBN 978-1-139-24891-4.
- Gale, Monica (2021). Catullus. Greece & Rome: New Surveys in the Classics. Vol. 51. Cambridge University Press. doi:10.1017/S0533245125000057. ISBN 978-1-009-70979-8.
- Giri, Giacomo (1922). "Se Lesbia di Catullo sia Clodia, la sorella di P. Clodio" [Whether Catullus's Lesbia is Clodia, the Sister of Publius Clodius]. Rivista Indo-Greco-Italiano di Filologia-Lingua-Antichita (in Italian). 6 (3): 1–16.
- Greene, Ellen (2007). "Catullus and Sappho". In Skinner, Marilyn B. (ed.). A Companion to Catullus. Chichester: Blackwell. pp. 131–150. doi:10.1002/9780470751565.ch8. ISBN 978-1-4051-3533-7.
- Hallett, Judith P. (2002). "Women's Voices and Catullus's Poetry". The Classical World. 95 (4): 421–424. JSTOR 10.2307/4352681.
- Harbach, Andrea; Tromp, Ton (2025). "He Says She Says: From Indirect Speech to a Voice of Her Own". Neohelicon. 52: 201–217. doi:10.1007/s11059-025-00800-0.
- Harrison, Stephen J. (2015). "Menander's Thaïs and Catullus' Lesbia". The Classical Quarterly. 65 (2): 887–888. doi:10.1017/S0009838815000026.
- Haupt, Moriz (1841). Observationes Criticae [Critical Observations] (in Latin). Leipzig: Weidmannsche Buchhandlung. OCLC 1473788192.
- Hawkins, Shane (2014). "Catullus 60: Lesbia, Medea, Clodia, Scylla". The American Journal of Philology. 135 (4): 559–597. JSTOR 24560467.
- Hillard, T. W. (1973). "The Sisters of Clodius Again". Latomus. 32 (3): 505–514. JSTOR 41529436.
- Holzberg, Niklas (2013). "Lesbia, the Poet, and the Two Faces of Sappho: 'Womanufacture' in Catullus". Proceedings of the Cambridge Philological Society. Second. 46: 28–44. doi:10.1017/S0068673500002431.
- Hooper, Richard W. (1985). "In Defence of Catullus's Dirty Sparrow". Greece & Rome. 32 (2): 162–178. JSTOR 642440.
- Hutchinson, Geoffrey O. (2012). "Booking Lovers: Desire and Design in Catullus". In Du Quesnay, Ian; Woodman, Tony (eds.). Catullus: Poems, Books, Readers. Cambridge University Press. pp. 48–78. doi:10.1017/CBO9780511733154.004. ISBN 978-0-511-73315-4.
- Inowlocki, Sabrina (2007). "Un trace de Genèse 11:1–9 dans les Fabulae attribuées à Hygin?" [A Trace of Genesis 11:1–19 in the Fabulae Attributed to Hyginus?]. Latomus (in French). 66 (2): 342–349. JSTOR 41545239.
- James, Sharon Lynn (2003). Learned Girls and Male Persuasion: Gender and Reading in Roman Love Elegy. Berkeley and Los Angeles: University of California Press. ISBN 0-520-23381-6.
- Janan, Micaela (1994). 'When the Lamp is Shattered': Desire and Narrative in Catullus. Carbondale and Edwardsville: Southern Illinois University Press. ISBN 0-8093-1765-6.
- Jocelyn, H. D. (1980). "On Some Unnecessarily Indecent Interpretations of Catullus 2 and 3". The American Journal of Philology. 101 (4): 421–441. JSTOR 293667.
- Kiss, Dániel (2024). "Review: Catullan Questions Revisited, by T. P. Wiseman" (PDF). Acta Classica. 67: 226–230.
- Łajkosz, Roksana Maria (2022). "Mistress of the Poet's Heart: On Reading Lesbia's Iconography". Quart: The Quarterly of the Institute of Art History at the University of Wrocław. 64 (2): 32–51.
- Lee, Guy, ed. (2008). Catullus: The Complete Poems. Oxford World's Classics. Oxford University Press. ISBN 978-0-19-953757-0.
- Levens, R. G. C. (1955). "Catullus". In Platnauer, Maurice (ed.). Fifty Years of Classical Scholarship. Oxford: Basil Blackwell. pp. 284–305. OCLC 250651824.
- Levy, Michelle (2020). Literary Manuscript Culture in Romantic Britain. Edinburgh University Press. ISBN 978-1-4744-5706-4.
- Lewis, Maxine (2018). "Anna Jackson's I, Clodia: Catullus, Women's Voices, and Feminist Implications". Classical Receptions Journal. 10 (2): 127–148. doi:10.1093/crj/clx018.
- Lindsay, Hugh (2009). "Suetonius's De Poetis: The Project and the Life of Vergil". Classicum. 35 (1): 2–7 – via Academia.edu.
- Kenney, E. J. (1982). "Predecessors". In Kenney, E. J.; Clausen, Wendell (eds.). The Cambridge History of Classical Literature. Vol. 2: Latin Literature. pp. 175–177. doi:10.1017/CHOL9780521210430. ISBN 0-521-21043-7.
- Marchand, Leslie A. (1957). Byron: A Biography. Vol. 1. New York: Alfred A. Knopf. OCLC 1338245205.
- Marsilio, Maria S. (2016). "Catullus 37: Lesbia, Egnatius, and Roman Mime". Acta Classica. 59: 203–214. JSTOR 26347108.
- Martin, Charles (1992). Catullus. New Haven: Yale University Press. ISBN 0-300-05200-6.
- McLeod, Colin (1973). "Parody and Personalities in Catullus". The Classical Quarterly. 23 (2): 294–303. JSTOR 638185.
- Miller, Catherine (2003). Jean Cocteau, Guillaume Apollinaire, Paul Claudel et le groupe des six: Rencontres poético-musicales autour des Mélodies et des Chansons [Jean Cocteau, Guillaume Apollinaire, Paul Claudel, and Les Six: Poetic-Musical Encounters Centered on Mélodies and Chansons] (in French). Sprimont: Mardaga. ISBN 2-87009-852-9.
- Moul, Victoria (2017). "Introduction". In Moul, Victoria (ed.). A Guide to Neo-Latin Literature. Cambridge University Press. pp. 1–14. doi:10.1017/9781139248914. ISBN 978-1-139-24891-4.
- Nappa, Christopher (1999). "The Goat, the Gout, and the Girl: Catullus 69, 71, and 77". Mnemosyne. Fourth. 52 (3): 266–276. JSTOR 4432976.
- Oade, Stephanie (2024). Catullus in Twentieth-Century Music: Lyrics and Lyricism. Oxford University Press. doi:10.1093/9780198918714.001.0001. ISBN 978-0-19-891868-4.
- Quinn, Kenneth (1973). Catullus: An Interpretation. New York: Barnes & Noble. SBN 06-495757-8.
- Quinn, Kenneth, ed. (1973). Catullus: The Poems (2nd ed.). Bristol Classical Press. ISBN 978-1-85399-497-5.
- Pursglove, Glyn (2000). "Catullus". In Classe, Olive (ed.). Encyclopedia of Literary Translation Into English. Vol. 1. London and Chicago: Fitzroy Dearborn. pp. 238–240. ISBN 1-884-964-36-2.
- Ramiro, Erastène, ed. (1887). Catalogue descriptif et analytique de l'œuvre gravé de Félicien Rops [Descriptive and Analytical Catalogue of the Engraved Works of Félicien Rops] (in French). Paris: Librairie Conquet. OCLC 902991262.
- Rankin, Herbert David (1969). "'Clodia II'". L'Antiquité Classique. 38 (2): 501–506.
- Rankin, Herbert David (1976). "Catullus and the 'Beauty' of Lesbia (Poems 43, 86 and 51)". Latomus. 35 (1): 3–11. JSTOR 41533478.
- Rebecchini, Guido (2002). Private Collectors in Mantua, 1500–1630. Roma: Edizioni di storia e letteratura. ISBN 88-8498-049-6.
- Rothstein, Max (1923). "Catull und Lesbia" [Catullus and Lesbia]. Philologus (in German). 78: 1–34.
- Sackville-West, Robert (2010). Inheritance: The Story of Knole and the Sackvilles. London: Bloomsbury. ISBN 978-1-4088-0338-7.
- Schmidt, Ernst August (1985). Catull [Catullus] (in German). Heidelberg: Carl Winter Universitätsverlag. ISBN 3-533-03432-1.
- Schrott, Raoul (1999). Die Erfindung der Poesie [The Invention of Poetry]. Die Andere Bibliothek (in German). Frankfurt am Main: Eichborn. ISBN 3-423-12703-1.
- Schwabe, Ludwig (1862). Quaestiones Catullianae [Catullan Questions]. C. Valerii Catulli Liber (in Latin). Vol. 1. Giessen: J. Ricker. OCLC 18915264.
- Sharrock, Alison R. (1991). "Womanufacture". Journal of Roman Studies. 81: 36–49. JSTOR 300487.
- Skinner, Marilyn B. (2011). Clodia Metelli: The Tribune's Sister. Oxford University Press. ISBN 978-0-19-537500-8.
- Skoie, Mathilde (2002). Reading Sulpicia: Commentaries, 1475–1990. Oxford University Press. ISBN 0-19-924573-8.
- Spentzou, Efrossini (2018). "Many Un/happy Returns from Eurydice". In Frangoulidis, Stavros; Harrison, Stephen (eds.). Life, Love and Death in Latin Poetry: Studies in Honor of Theodore D. Papanghelis. Berlin: De Gruyter. pp. 295–312. ISBN 978-3-11-058776-0.
- Stead, Evanghélia (2004). Le Monstre, Le Singe et Le Fœtus: Tératogonie et Décadence dans l'Europe fin-de-siècle [The Monster, the Monkey and the Foetus: Teratogony and Decadence in Fin-de-Siècle Europe] (in French). Geneva: Librairie Droz. ISBN 2-600-00921-3.
- Stead, Henry (2016). A Cockney Catullus: The Reception of Catullus in Romantic Britain, 1795–1821. Classical Presences. Oxford University Press. ISBN 978-0-19-874488-7.
- Stroh, Wilfried (1975). Taxis und Taktik: Die advokatische Dispositionskunst in Ciceros Gerichtsreden [Taxis and Tactics: The Art of Strategic Disposition in Cicero's Forensic Orations] (in German). Stuttgart: B. G. Teubner. doi:10.1515/9783110951318. ISBN 3-519-07406-0.
- Stroh, Wilfried (1979). "Ovids Liebeskunst und die Ehegesetze des Augustus" [Ovid's Art of Love and Augustus's Marriage Laws]. Gymnasium (in German). 86: 323–352.
- Tarrant, Richard J. (1983). "Catullus". In Reynolds, Leighton D. (ed.). Texts and Transmission: A Survey of the Latin Classics. Oxford University Press. pp. 43–45. ISBN 0-19-814456-3.
- Theodorakopoulos, Elena (2013). "Catullus and Lesbia Translated in Women's Historical Novels". In Hardwick, Lorna; Harrison, Stephen (eds.). Classics in the Modern World: A "Democratic Turn"?. Oxford University Press. pp. 275–286. ISBN 978-0-19-967392-6.
- Thompson, Douglas Ferguson Scott (1978). "Introduction". In Thompson, Douglas Ferguson Scott (ed.). Catullus: A Critical Edition. Chapel Hill: University of North Carolina Press. pp. 3–43. ISBN 0-8078-1323-0.
- Trumble, Angus (2001). Love & Death: Art in the Age of Queen Victoria. Adelaide: Art Gallery of South Australia. ISBN 0-7308-3076-4.
- Ullman, Berthold Louis (1960). "The Transmission of the Text of Catullus". Studi in onore di Luigi Castiglioni. Florence: Sansoni. pp. 1027–1057. OCLC 10195072.
- Wangermée, Robert, ed. (1996). Paul Collaer: Correspondance aves des amis musiciens [Paul Collaer: Correspondence with Musician Friends] (in French). Sprimont: Pierre Mardaga. ISBN 2-87009-606-2.
- Williams, Gareth (2006). "Ovid's Exile Poetry: Tristia, Epistulae ex Ponto and Ibis". In Hardie, Philip (ed.). The Cambridge Companion to Ovid. Cambridge University Press. pp. 233–245. doi:10.1017/CCOL0521772818. ISBN 978-0-511-99896-6.
- Wilkinson, L. P. (1977). "Catullus 11.11–12". Proceedings of the Cambridge Philological Society. 23: 133–134. doi:10.1017/S0068673500003965.
- Wiseman, Timothy Peter (1974). 'Cinna the Poet' and Other Roman Essays. Leicester University Press. ISBN 0-7185-1120-4.
- Wiseman, Timothy Peter (1985). Catullus and His World: A Reappraisal. Cambridge University Press. OCLC 922579930.
- Wiseman, Timothy Peter (1987). "The Masters of Sirmio". Roman Studies, Literary and Historical. Liverpool and Wolfeboro, New Hampshire: Francis Cairns. pp. 311–372. ISBN 0-905205-62-6.
- Wiseman, Timothy Peter (2022). Catullan Questions Revisited. Cambridge University Press. doi:10.1017/9781009235761. ISBN 978-1-009-23576-1.
- Young, Elizabeth Marie (2015). Translation as Muse: Poetic Translation in Catullus's Rome. University of Chicago Press. ISBN 978-0-226-27991-6.
- Ypsilanti, Maria (2005). "Literary Loves as Cycles: From Meleager to Ovid". L'Antiquité Classique. 74: 83–110. JSTOR 41666128.
- Zarker, John W. (1973). "Lesbia's Charms". The Classical Journal. 68 (2): 107–115. JSTOR 3295822.
- Ziolkowski, Theodore (2020). Roman Poets in Modern Guise: The Reception of Roman Poetry Since World War I. Rochester, New York: Camden House. ISBN 978-1-78744-874-2.
