= Catullus 7 =

Latin poem by Catullus

Catullus 7 in Latin and English

Catullus 7 in Latin

Catullus 7 is a poem by Roman poet Gaius Valerius Catullus (c. 84–c. 54 BCE) addressed to his mistress Lesbia. Similarly to Catullus 5, the poem revels in counting kisses, with a touch of stellar voyeurism.

The meter of this poem is hendecasyllabic, a common form in Catullus' poetry.

== Latin text and translation ==
Latin text

quaeris quot mihi basiationes
tuae Lesbia sint satis superque
quam magnus numerus Libyssae harenae
lasarpiciferis iacet Cyrenis
oraclum Iovis inter aestuosi
et Batti veteris sacrum sepulcrum
aut quam sidera multa cum tacet nox
furtivos hominum vident amores
tam te basia multa basiare
vesano satis et super Catullo est
quae nec pernumerare curiosi
possint nec mala fascinare lingua

Translation:
English translation

You ask how many kisses
Of yours, Lesbia, would be enough and more for me.
As great as the number of Libyan sands
That lie at Cyrene producing silphium
Between the oracle of sweltering Jupiter
And the sacred tomb of old Battus, (Note: There are several mythological and historical figures called Battus, and it is unclear to which one Catullus was referring.)
Or as many as the stars that, when the night is silent,
See the secret love affairs of men:
For you to kiss so many kisses
is more than enough for crazy Catullus,
These kisses which neither the curious can count
Nor an evil tongue bewitch.

== Poetic themes and effects ==
Catullus 7 is considered to follow Catullus 5 "both literally and thematically," and collectively the two poems (sometimes alongside Catullus 48) may be referred to as the basia (kiss) poems. However, although the themes of passion and kissing are repeated, the mood differs. Where Catullus 5 is "eager," using simple, urgent language, Catullus 7 is full of "learned details" and "highly elaborate language."

== Bibliography ==
- Johnston, PA (1993). "Love and Laserpicium in Catullus 7". Classical Philology. 88 (4): 328–329. doi:10.1086/367376. S2CID 162290715.
- Arkins, B (1979). "Catullus 7". L'Antiqué Classique. 48 (2): 630–635. doi:10.3406/antiq.1979.1954.
- Segal, C (1974). "More Alexandrianism in Catullus VII?". Mnemosyne. 27 (2): 139–143. doi:10.1163/156852574X00836.
- Segal, C (1968). "Catullus 5 and 7: A Study in Complementaries". American Journal of Philology. 89 (3): 284–301. doi:10.2307/293446. JSTOR 293446.
- Moorhouse, AC (1963). "Two Adjectives in Catullus 7". American Journal of Philology. 84 (4): 417–418. doi:10.2307/293237. JSTOR 293237.
