= Pro Caelio =

Speech by Cicero, 56 BC

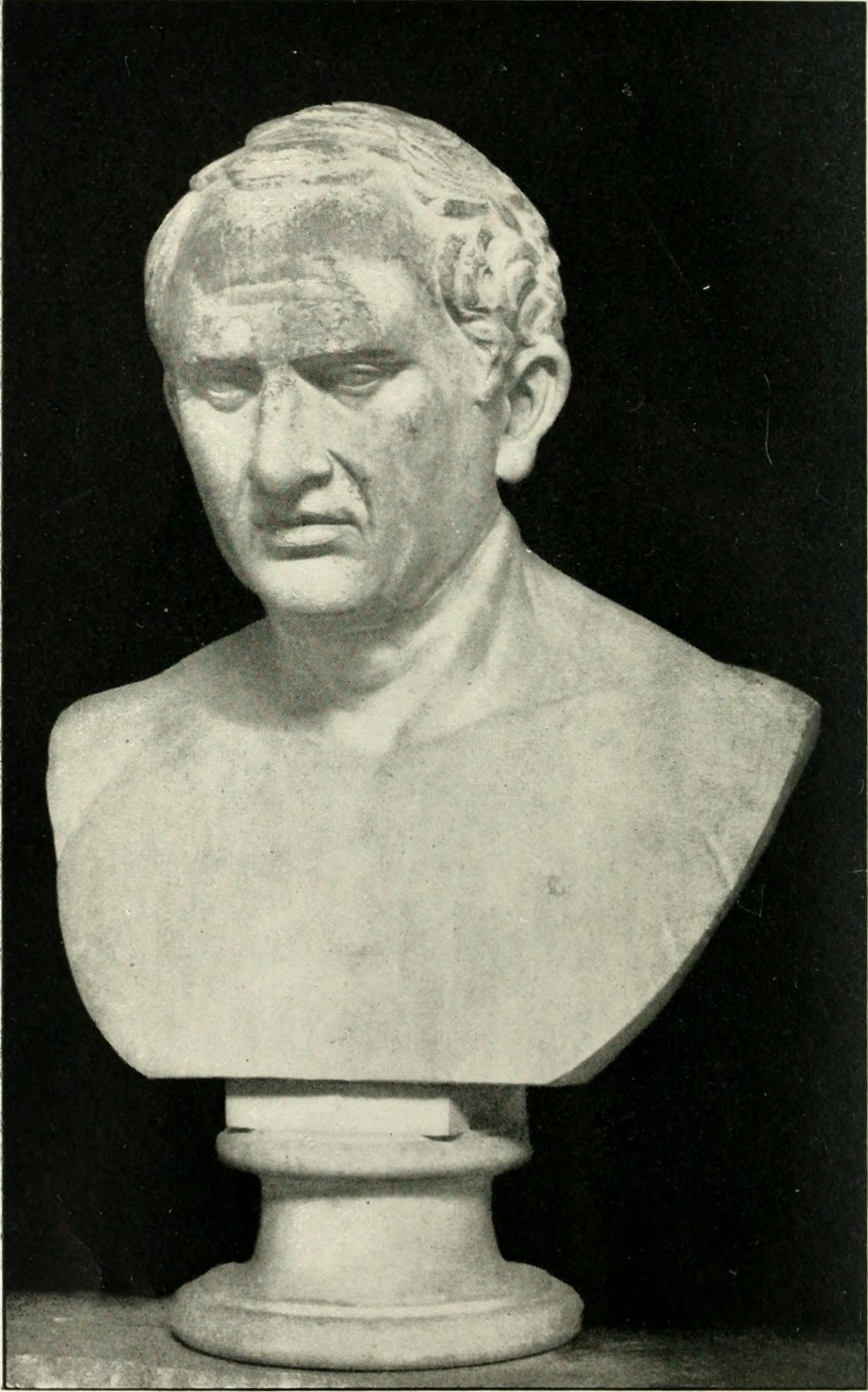
A bust of Cicero, depicted at the age of around 60

Pro Caelio is a speech given on 4 April 56 BC, by the famed Roman orator Marcus Tullius Cicero in defence of Marcus Caelius Rufus, who had once been Cicero's pupil but more recently had become estranged from him. Cicero's reasons for defending Caelius are uncertain, but one motive may have been his hatred of Publius Clodius Pulcher, who two years earlier had passed a law which had forced Cicero into exile, and whose sister Cicero attacks mercilessly in this speech.

The speech is regarded as one of Cicero's most brilliant and entertaining orations. It was also famous in ancient times, being quoted by Petronius, Aulus Gellius, Fronto, Quintilian, and Jerome. For modern readers it is of interest in that Clodia has been identified with some probability with the poet Catullus's Lesbia.

Caelius was charged with vis (political violence), one of the most serious crimes in Republican Rome. Caelius' prosecutors, Lucius Sempronius Atratinus, Publius Clodius (probably not Publius Clodius Pulcher, but more likely a relative), and Lucius Herennius Balbus, charged him with the following crimes:

1. Inciting civil disturbances at Naples;
2. Assault on the Alexandrians at Puteoli;
3. Damage to the property of Palla (little is known of this but it has been suggested that Palla was mother-in-law of Atratinus's adoptive sister);
4. Involvement in the murder of Dio of Alexandria, using gold obtained from Clodia.
5. Preparing poison for use against Clodia.

Caelius spoke first in his own defense and asked Marcus Licinius Crassus to defend him during the trial. Cicero's speech was the last of the defense speeches, dealing with the last two charges. The magistrate Gnaeus Domitius presided over the trial.

== Background and trial ==
Marcus Caelius Rufus was probably born in 82 BC, at Interamnia in Picenum, where his father was a member of the equites (knight) class, a wealthy middle class placed just below the patrician upper class. From 66 to 63 BC, Caelius served a political apprenticeship under Crassus and Cicero. Throughout that apprenticeship, he became familiar with life in the Roman Forum. In 63 BC, Caelius turned his back on Cicero to support Catiline, who was running for consulship. It is unclear whether or not Caelius supported Catiline after the latter had lost the election and taken up arms, but he was not among the people prosecuted for their involvement in the conspiracy.

From 62 to 60, Caelius left Rome to serve with the governor of Africa, Quintus Pompeius Rufus. As a young man, that was a very good opportunity for Caelius to see the world and make a little money. However, Caelius still wanted to make a name for himself in Rome, and in April 59 BC, he brought a prosecution against Gaius Antonius Hybrida, Cicero's colleague in the consulship of 63 BC, for extortion. Cicero disapproved of the prosecution and took up Hybrida's defense. However, Caelius won the trial and gained recognition among Roman citizens.

As a result, Caelius was able to move to the Palatine Hill, where he rented an apartment from Publius Clodius Pulcher. His apartment was located near Clodius's sister, Clodia, who was then 36 and recently widowed. Caelius and Clodia soon became lovers. In late 57 or early 56 BC, Caelius broke from the Clodii for some unknown reason. Clodius and Clodia were determined to punish Caelius for leaving them.

On February 11, 56 BC, Caelius charged Atratinus's father Lucius Calpurnius Bestia with electoral malpractice in the elections for praetor in 57 BC; he also insinuated that Bestia had poisoned his wives with aconite. Cicero came to Bestia's defense and saw him acquitted. However, Caelius would not admit defeat and made a second charge against Bestia, who was running for the praetorship once again in the elections of 56 BC. Bestia's 17-year-old son, Lucius Sempronius Atratinus, did not want his father's trial to take place and so he made a charge against Caelius. If Caelius was convicted, he could not proceed with his prosecution against Bestia. Atratinus charged Caelius in the violence court (quaestio de vi) to prevent any delay in the proceedings of the trial. A certain Publius Clodius and Lucius Herennius Balbus came to Atratinus's assistance.

=== Charges ===
The charges made against Caelius were linked to the attempt of Pharaoh Ptolemy XII Auletes to recover his throne after being deposed in 59 BC. After he had been deposed, Ptolemy fled to Rome, where he pleaded with the Roman Senate to give him an army so that he might reclaim his throne. However, the Alexandrians were not interested in giving Ptolemy back the throne of Egypt and sent a deputation of 100 citizens, led by the philosopher Dio, to the Senate to hear their case. Ptolemy reacted by bribing, intimidating and even murdering members of the deputation, which angered Roman citizens.

Despite Ptolemy's efforts, Dio successfully made it to Rome and stayed in the house of Titus Coponius, a member of the Senate. In 57 BC, the consul Publius Cornelius Lentulus Spinther decreed that Ptolemy should be restored to the throne of Egypt. However, an oracle was found in the Sibylline Books that forbade Ptolemy's restoration, and the Senate was forced to rescind its decree. Exhausted from his attempts to reclaim his throne, Ptolemy retired to Ephesus. In Rome, Pompey waited for the command to claim the throne of Egypt.

In 57 BC, Dio was murdered by one Publius Asicius. The public directed most of their anger toward Pompey, whom they believed to be responsible for the murder. At first, Publius Asicius, who was supposedly an agent of Pompey, was prosecuted for the murder of Dio. However, after Cicero successfully defended him, Asicius was acquitted, and Caelius was prosecuted for the murder.

=== Trial ===
The actual trial took place April 3–4, 56 BC. The prosecution spoke first, and Atratinus attacked Caelius's character and morals, Clodius described the charges in detail, and Balbus spoke against Caelius's behavior and morality.

The defence speeches began with Caelius making witty jeers at Clodia. Then, Crassus defended against the first three charges, and finally, Cicero, after dealing briefly with the murder of Dio, attacked Clodia. Cicero's speech took place on April 4, the second day of the trial. He made accusations that Clodia was no better than a prostitute and claimed that Caelius was a smart man to disassociate himself from her. By centering his speech on attacking Clodia, Cicero avoided setting himself against public opinion or damaging his relationship with Pompey. In the end, Caelius was acquitted of all of the charges.

=== Aftermath ===
Caelius was now free to continue with his career. He became tribune of the plebs in 52 BC, and closely allied to the politician Titus Annius Milo, who, despite Cicero's famous defence (pro Milone), was condemned in that year for the murder of Publius Clodius and went into exile. In the following year, 51 BC, Cicero was sent to Cilicia as governor of the province. Before he left, he arranged with Caelius to send him political news from Rome. 17 letters from Caelius to Cicero survive, of which it has been said: "His style is one of the most interesting in Latin literature, vivid, dramatic, elliptical, familiar, and the whole collection is particularly valuable as exemplifying the type of writing fashionable among the bright young men of the day, besides expressing the writer's personality in a way that nothing else could do." In 51 Caelius became curule aedile, and made a vigorous speech arguing against abuses of Rome's water supply. Gradually he began to support Julius Caesar. In 49 BC, after voting against the senate's demand that Caesar should surrender his army, Caelius fled north to join Caesar. Eventually, however, he fell out with Caesar and died in a scuffle against Caesarian troops in Thurii in southern Italy in 48 BC.

As for the 17-year-old Atratinus, though he lost the case, at least Caelius refrained from prosecuting his father again. He went on to have a distinguished career, becoming consul in 34 BC, and governor of the province of Africa in 23 BC. He died in AD 7 at the age of 78.

== Summary of the speech ==
In some speeches there is a narratio following the exordium but in this speech there is a long section (praemunitio) devoted to clearing away some of the insinuations and aspersions on the character of Caelius made by the prosecutors. The narration is briefly found in §30 and then again in sketchy form in §51.

The speech may be summarised as follows:

Exordium

1–2 Cicero reminds the jurors that it is a public holiday; the court is one concerning a charge of political violence, but Caelius has not committed a crime within the competence of the court. The real reason for the trial is a certain woman.

Praemunitio

3–5 It is not true that Caelius has disrespected his father, nor that he is out of favour with the people of his home town, who have sent a delegation in his support.

6–9 The criticisms of Caelius's way of life in his youth are baseless; Cicero feels sorry for Atratinus in having to make this part of the accusation. In fact Caelius was a pupil of Cicero himself, at his father's request.

10–14 Caelius has also been criticised for associating with Catiline; yet Catiline deceived many people, even Cicero himself for a time.

15–18 Cicero claims that it is quite untrue that Caelius supported Catiline's conspiracy; Caelius is also innocent of bribery and corruption. There is no proof that he was in debt; and the rent he paid for his house has been exaggerated. It was on his father's advice that he went to live in Rome; and it is a pity he did so for there he met his "Medea".

19–22 The senator who will be produced alleging that Caelius beat him up, and the witnesses who allege that Caelius assaulted their wives after a dinner-party can be dismissed straightaway. The truth cannot be discovered in this way.

23–24 Crassus has already dealt with the other accusations; it is a pity he did not deal with the murder of Dio. But the murder of Dio is completely irrelevant to the present proceedings.

25–30 Herennius's speech scolding Caelius on his sinful behaviour can also be dismissed as absurd. Herennius spoke much about the dissipation of young people in general, but the jurors must not let this prejudice them in this particular case.

30–32 The real charges are two: one about some gold, and the other about some poison. Both are connected with Clodia, who is Caelius's real enemy.

33–34 Cicero imagines what her famous ancestor Appius Claudius Caecus might say to her: "Are you not moved, Clodia, by the memory of your father, uncle, and other ancestors, both male and female, or of your distinguished husband Quintus Metellus? How come you became so intimate with this Caelius? Was it not just foolishness and lust?"

35–36 Cicero admits that the old man might be equally severe with Caelius; but he says he will deal with Caelius later. For now he imagines what her younger brother Publius Clodius Pulcher, with whom she is so "intimate", might say to her: "Why are you so worried about losing this handsome young man, sister? You have some gardens right next to the Tiber, where all the young men go to swim: you can pick up another one there any day!"

37–38 How should Cicero deal with Caelius? Should he imagine one of those stern fathers from the comedies of Caecilius? Or should he speak to him like the indulgent father in Terence's Adelphoe? But could anyone blame Caelius when Clodia's behaviour is like that of a courtesan?

39–42 Perhaps people will blame Cicero for Caelius's behaviour, since Caelius was my pupil. But that strictness of the past is obsolete these days. A young man should be allowed to have his fling, provided he does not do it to excess.

43–47 One could mention many well-known men who misbehaved in their youth. But Caelius is a man of good character. The jurors should not believe everything they hear about him; these charges stem from Clodia.

48–50 When the lady is of easy virtue, what reason is there for complaint? The jurors can draw their own conclusions from her conduct.

Argumentatio

51–55 There are two main charges, of gold and of poison. Caelius is alleged to have told Clodia that he wanted some gold to pay for some games, but in reality to bribe the slaves of Lucceius, with whom Dio was staying. This can be refuted by hearing the witness statement of Lucceius himself. (Testimony of Lucceius).

56–60 As for the poison, why should Caelius have wanted to poison Clodia? There is nothing consistent in the story. And Clodia would do better not to mention poisons in view of the sudden and tragic death of her husband Metellus the previous year!

61–69 The prosecutors allege that the poison was given to Publius Licinius, to be handed over to Clodia's slaves in a public bathhouse; that the slaves told their mistress, who arranged for some young men to catch Licinius when he handed over the poison. And yet these men allowed Licinius to get away! The whole thing is a farce. And why did Clodia free those slaves, if not to cover something up? It is scarcely surprising that there was a story in connection with the flask which is too obscene to mention but he is sure the jurors will understand what he means! This story would not have been believed if it did not fit the character of the woman it was told about.

Peroratio

70–80 The jurors can see how Caelius has been victimised. It is quite wrong to accuse him under the lex Lutatia, whose purpose is to curb major uprisings against the state, not to satisfy the vengefulness of a woman. He is an honourable and hard-working young man, as his whole life shows. Cicero begs the jurors to preserve him for the State and for his unhappy father. When in the last few days a true criminal such as Sextus Cloelius, who destroyed Cicero's house and burnt his brother's, has been acquitted, it is fitting that the jurors should acquit a man of good character such as Caelius. He promises that they will reap a rich reward in future from Caelius's services.

== Scholarly observations ==
=== Cicero's ulterior motive ===
In T. A. Dorey's article "Cicero, Clodia, & the ‘Pro Caelio'", Dorey argued that although Cicero stressed Clodia's involvement in the case against Caelius as an important role, she played only a secondary part. In fact, Herennius stated that the case against Caelius would not have been made without the prosecution against Bestia. Dorey claimed that the prosecution of Caelius was an attempt at delaying the second charge against Bestia, and was caused by Caelius' new attack against the family of Bestia and Atratinus.

Throughout the speech, Cicero displaced the cause of the attack on Clodia, instead of an attack on Atratinus, to build his defense of Caelius. Dorey claims that cannot be believed, however, because an orator and a historian in Ancient Rome were not the same since an orator's job was "to win his case" and a historian's was to tell "the truth". In his article, Dorey claims that the prosecution's aim was that "even if Caelius were acquitted, there was the chance of his emerging so discredited as seriously to jeopardize his prospects of success in his renewed action against Bestia". To do so, the prosecution charged him with two attempted murders. The charges would have been indisputable because Clodia had previously provided Caelius with funds before, and there was "little doubt" that Caelius had taken part in the intimidation and persecution of the Alexandrian envoys; Cicero even admitted it in his speech. Even though Cicero tried to "ridicule" Licinius and the slaves of Clodia's rendezvous at the baths to defend Caelius, there was no doubt that the event took place and that "a casket containing some substance to be administered to Clodia" was exchanged.

Dorey argued in the article that Clodia's involvement in the trial as "vindictive spite and the desire to revenge herself on Caelius for casting her off" was a part of Cicero's strategy in his defense of Caelius. By proving that Clodia was attacking Caelius out of spite, he proved Caelius's innocence. In fact, the prosecution's strategy hinged on the jury's acceptance of Clodia's evidence. Cicero's strategy then depended on his ability to disprove Clodia in three ways: by proving that the case was brought against Caelius because Clodia was being vindictive, by casting doubt on the reliability of witnesses and by discrediting Clodia completely. Therefore, Cicero unleashed a cruel attack against Clodia in his defense, but the attack had been provoked. Clodia had helped loot Cicero's house during his exile after the Catiline events, and in 60 BC, Cicero wrote a letter to Atticus in which he "[indulged] in an extremely lewd witticism at Clodia's expense".

=== Identification of Clodia as Lesbia ===
Among Cicero's orations, Pro Caelio is particularly celebrated for its connections to the poetry of Catullus. Popular critical consensus has long identified Clodia Metelli, who features so prominently in the speech, as Catullus's famed lover Lesbia. However, recent critics have assailed that connection with various degrees of success. In his book Catullan Questions, T. P. Wiseman argues that the identification of Lesbia as one of Clodius Pulcher's three sisters is undeniable. The 2nd-century writer Apuleius claimed that Catullus gave his lover Clodia the pseudonym Lesbia; Wiseman traces Apuleius's source for this claim to the historian Suetonius, and Suetonius' sources to Gaius Julius Hyginus's De Vita Rebusque Illustrium Virorum. Hyginus had contact with several men associated with Catullus, who very likely knew Lesbia's true identity. They include Helvius Cinna, Pollio, Nepos, Varro and even Cicero himself. Moreover, scholars agree that the repeated word pulcher, meaning "pretty", in Catullus's poem 79 is a pun on Clodius's cognomen, Pulcher. Thus, the Lesbius in that poem is Clodius Pulcher, and Lesbia must be one of his three sisters. However, all three sisters possessed the name Clodia and so difficulties arise in proving that Catullus's lover must have been the Clodia featured in Pro Caelio. The most common evidence for that connection is the implied charge of incest usually detected in Catullus 79 in comparison to the charges of incest against Clodia in Pro Caelio. However, Wiseman characterizes Cicero's rhetoric as remaining "on the level of mocking insinuation without proof or evidence" and notes that while there were whispers of Clodius committing incest with all three of his sisters, multiple disinterested sources exist only concerning his alleged relationship with the youngest sister, Clodia Luculli. Wiseman concludes that while it is certain Lesbia was one of Clodius's three sisters named Clodia, it is impossible to determine which of these she was.

=== Catullus and the Pro Caelio ===
Catullus addresses a Caelius in poems 58 and 100, and a Rufus in poems 69 and 77. There is also a Rufulus ('little Rufus') in poem 59 (although the text is uncertain). Poem 71 does not mention Rufus or Caelius by name, but the mention of a hircus 'he-goat' (i.e. bad smell) in the armpits of the unnamed lover in poem 71 clearly links it to a similar phrase in poem 69.

Scholars differ as to whether any of the six different poems above refer to Cicero's Caelius Rufus. Some, such as Wiseman, argue that none of them are Cicero's Caelius, some argue that all of them are, while others take an intermediate view; for example, Austin believes that poem 77 may refer to Cicero's Caelius. The Rufus of 77 is a one-time friend of Catullus, who has wronged him by stealing his happiness. Since Catullus and Caelius were of similar character and age, Austin thinks it possible, or even probable, that this second Rufus is to be identified with Cicero's Caelius.

One problem is that the Caelius of poem 100 is referred to as "Veronese"; for Austin and others this rules him out as the same man, since Cicero's Caelius is said in the Pro Caelio §5 to come from Interamnia in Picenum (but the text is uncertain). Other scholars, however, do not see this as an obstacle to identifying the two Caeliuses. A second, but lesser, objection is that the Caelius of 58 and 100 seems to be a friend of Catullus, whereas the Rufus of 59, 69, 71, and 77 is the target of derision and invective.

Despite these problems, Helena Dettmer believes that the chain of verbal and structural links connecting the six poems makes it clear that they all form part of a single cycle, and that they all refer to the same man, Cicero's Caelius Rufus. She also argues that the parallels between poems 58 and 59 indicate that the "Rufa the Bononian" (i.e. from Bologna) is a pseudonym for Lesbia. If this is correct, it appears that Catullus and Caelius were close friends until Caelius angered Catullus by stealing Lesbia from him.

Another poem of interest for this identification is 49, which is addressed to Cicero. Dettmer points out that the striking phrase Romuli nepotes 'grandsons of Romulus' at the beginning of 49 links it to Remi nepotes 'grandsons of Remus' at the end of 58, while the word patronus 'patron' at the end of 49 links it to Caeli 'Caelius' at the beginning of 58. Thus the Caelius of poem 58 is the Caelius defended by Cicero in the year 56 BC.

It has also been suggested that the mala bestia 'evil beast' of poem 69 (referring again to the "goat" or bad smell of Rufus's armpits), which Catullus urges Rufus to kill, is a pun on the name of Calpurnius Bestia, whom Caelius had attacked in a court case earlier in the year 56 BC.

=== Accusations of Clodia's incest in Cicero and Catullus ===
One major potential connection between Lesbia and Clodia is the similarity between implications of incest apparent in Catullus 79 (Note: A translation of Catullus 79 can be found here.) and the Cicero's charges of incest in the Pro Caelio. However, the association is weakened somewhat by James L. Butrica's argument in "Clodius the Pulcher in Catullus and Cicero". He emphasises the prominence of the word pulcher in Catullus's poem and acknowledges that it identifies the character Lesbius with Clodius Pulcher and Lesbia with Clodia. However, he goes on to argue that there are no overtones of incest in the poem. Rather, Catullus's reference to the reluctance of Clodius's associates to exchange with him a common social kiss implies connotations of fellatio. Butrica goes on to cite the 4th-century commentator Maurus Servius Honoratus, who noted that the word pulcher was sometimes used as an ironic euphemism for the word exoletus, which were Roman males raised as sex slaves from boyhood. Exoleti were characterised by effeminacy, sexual passivity, immorality and an insatiable carnal appetite. Thus, Butrica argues that the twist in Catullus 79 is the pun on Clodius's cognomen with a synonym for exoletus, and he connects that characterisation with fragments of lost Cicero speeches that attribute similar qualities to Clodius Pulcher. Butrica admits that the accusations of incest in the Pro Caelio are explicitly clear, but he characterises them as an escalation in Cicero's rhetoric against Clodius that go from merely mocking his sexual passivity to making serious charges of illegal sexual conduct with his own sister.

=== Cicero's use of tragedy ===
A. S. Hollis points out in an article written in 1998 that Cicero uses subtle references to popular tragedies that circulated around Rome at the time that Pro Caelio was given. For instance, Hollis quotes Cicero's use of equus Troianus and muliebre bellum, both of which were titles of popular tragedies contemporary with Cicero's oration. In fact, Equus Troianus was the name of the tragedy performed at the opening of Pompey's Theater just a couple years after Pro Caelio was given, as Hollis points out. There are a number of much more overt tragic metaphors that Cicero inserts into his oration. The most obvious is, of course, during the course of his vociferous assaults on Clodia, Cicero often compares her to Medea and also Clytemnestra. Finally, there are a few lines of Cicero's speech that Hollis identifies as being able to be syllabified into iambic line form and so there is even greater subtlety to Cicero's tragic references.

=== Cicero as patron, Cicero as father? ===
James M. May demonstrates Cicero's use of father/son imagery that is so prevalent in Cicero's speech, as it overlays the court room realities of Roman law, namely the patron-client relationship. From the beginning of the speech, Cicero's defense begins to present Caelius as if he were his son. May identifies and elaborates on what he views as the "boys will be boys" defense inherent to Cicero's argument. Cicero must first present Clodia as an unchaste, promiscuous woman, and he accomplishes that by his use of language associated with prostitution while he describes her. Caelius's relationship with her as the result of the former's naïveté and her seductive amoral ways. Earlier in the speech, Cicero carefully uses his advanced age and lofty reputation as an orator to defuse the usefulness of the arguments made by Atratinus, who was only 17 years old when he participated in the prosecution. Also, Cicero can defuse the connection between Caelius and Catiline by presenting the former as the rebellious son who had been seduced into false ways by corrupting influences. Finally, Cicero completes his destruction of the Caelius/Catiline connection by pronouncing that Caelius had nearly joined with Catiline, as May is quick to point out: "like father, like son!"

=== Domus motif ===
Anne Leen's article "Clodia Oppugnatrix: The Domus Motif in Cicero's Pro Caelio" argued that Cicero's use of the Roman institution of the domus, or home, established the respectable reputation of Caelius and the ghastly reputation of Clodia. The domus in Latin literature "is charged with precisely gendered social, cultural, and political significance". It is mentioned within the speech at least 27 times. Clodia's house is mentioned the most and it "a problematized space in which traditional Roman expectations of domestic behavior are egregiously violated". Leen then argued that to be a strategy of Cicero in which he attacked Clodia and defended Caelius. Each time that the domus is mentioned, the actual home should be understood as well as the immediate family and extended family. The décor and visitors of the domus and the family determined the owner's reputation, power and prestige in Republican Rome. Throughout the speech, Cicero resurrected Caelius's reputation by repeatedly placing him in prestigious Roman domus such as the homes of Crassus and Cicero.

In Latin literature, the domus was the sphere of influence for women that displayed the Roman qualities of "chastity, fidelity, and wifely obedience" to the husband. Clodia's household was, by default, in the wrong because there was no male present. Throughout the speech, Cicero did not try to disprove the allegations completely that Clodia had brought against Caelius, but he aimed to disprove her through destroying her reputation with the domus imagery. When Cicero described Clodia's household, he never mentioned Caelius being at her house at the same time as her. By doing so, Cicero cast Caelius on the "positive side of Roman values" and put Clodia in an "abyss of sexual license and its metonymic counterparts, public chaos and political anarchy".

Cicero also brought the history of the Clodian family into his speech to discredit Clodia by contrasting Clodia's present behavior with the behaviour of her "great Republican lineages".

Men in Ancient Rome were to have a full, busy household; however, women were not supposed to have a busy household like Clodia's domus. Her household reflected "personal disrepute, sexual misconduct, and social disorder". By having her own household, she was taking what was rightly owned by men in Ancient Rome and so she blurred the lines between men and women. Cicero claimed that was a threat to the Republic as a whole. Cicero then claimed that Clodia created these charges against Caelius and attacked the reputation of Lucceius, who was living in Dio's domus. Insulting a guest would hurt the host's reputation, and Cicero did not let Clodia forget that she had done so. Through Cicero's attack of Clodia, Caelius was established as the innocent victim; his innocence essentially convicted Clodia of the murder of Dio. Leen argued that the domus had developed a conscience through the ordeal, aided and abetted Clodia through the murder of Dio and convicted her of the crime afterwards. However, Cicero did not let the jury forget that he was the best witness of Clodia's schemes by telling his story at the end of the speech. His once-great house, which housed Caelius first, no longer existed after Clodia.
