= Battus =

Battus or Battos may refer to:

== Animals ==
- Battus (butterfly), a genus of butterfly of the family Papilionidae
- Battus (trilobite), a synonym for several agnostid trilobites, now assigned to other genera

== Mythology ==
- Battus (mythology), a figure in Greek mythology who witnessed Hermes stealing Apollo's cattle. He was punished by being turned into stone.

== People ==
- Battus of Malta, king of the island of Malta, protector of Anna Perenna in Ovid's Fasti
- Battus I of Cyrene (died 600 BC), founder of the Ancient Greek colony of Cyrene, Libya
- Battus II of Cyrene (fl. 583 to 560 BC), third Greek king of Cyrenaica and Cyrene
- Battus III of Cyrene (fl. 6th century BC), fifth Greek king of Cyrenaica
- Battus IV of Cyrene, (fl. 6th and 5th century BC), seventh Greek king of Cyrenaica
- Hugo Brandt Corstius (1935–2014), Dutch author
