= Catullus 5 =

Latin poem by Catullus

Catullus 5 in Latin and English

Catullus 5 is a poem by Gaius Valerius Catullus (c. 84–c. 54 BCE), a passionate ode to Lesbia that encourages lovers to disregard the snide comments of others, and to live only for each other, since life is brief and death brings a night of perpetual sleep. This poem has been translated and imitated many times and is one of his most famous poems.

The poem is written in the Phalaecian hendecasyllabic meter (Latin: hendecasyllabus phalaecius) which has verses of 11 syllables, a common form in Catullus' poetry.

== Text ==
Catullus 5 in Latin

=== Latin text ===
The metric scheme is ⏒ ⏒ | ‒ ⏑ ⏑ | ‒ ⏑ | ‒ ⏑ | ‒ ⏒.

Vīvāmus, mea Lesbia, atque amēmus,
rūmōrēsque senum sevēriōrum
omnēs ūnius aestimēmus assis!
sōlēs occidere et redīre possunt:
nōbīs, quum semel occidit brevis lūx,
nox est perpetua ūna dormienda.
Dā mī bāsia mīlle, deinde centum,
dein mīlle altera, dein secunda centum,
deinde ūsque altera mīlle, deinde centum;
dein, quum mīlia multa fēcerīmus,
conturbābimus illa, nē sciāmus,
aut nē quis malus invidēre possit,
quum tantum sciat esse bāsiōrum.

=== English translation ===
Let us live, my Lesbia, and let us love,
and count the rumours of rather stern old men
at a penny's fee!
Suns may set and rise again;
for us, when once the brief light has set,
an eternal night must be slept.
Give me a thousand kisses, then a hundred,
then another thousand, then a second hundred,
then yet another thousand, then a hundred;
then, when we have performed many thousands,
we shall shake them into confusion, in order that we might not know,
and in order not to let any evil person envy us,
when he knows that there are so many of our kisses.

== Poetic effects ==
In lines 2-3, Catullus first uses "hissing" sibilants to describe the rumors of "stern old men" -- rumoresque senum severiorum -- thus echoing the hissing of their conversations, then harsh sibilants in his evaluation of them to emphasize his disdain for these rumors.

Lines 4-6 contrast the continually rising and setting sun with the brevity of life, which once it ends, ends forever. Soles (suns) and nox ([eternal] night, or death) occupy parallel positions at the beginning of their lines, while the "brief light" of life (lux) is placed far from the suns and immediately before the eternal night, thus "conveying the brevity of life syntactically."

There is also a second chiasmus in these lines:

brevis	lux	nox	perpetua
A	B	B	A

In lines 7-9, the repetitious counting up of kisses by the thousands and hundreds have been noted as important by several authors. Some claim that it evokes the tallying of kisses with a Roman abacus, which had separate columns for tens, hundreds, and thousands places. In light of this imagery, the verb "conturbabimus" can imply a visualization of shaking up the abacus to conceal the exact number of tallied kisses, obfuscating the exact number and confusing those who might give the evil eye (lines 11-12). These lines have also been noted by critics for their "passion" and "simplicity."

Taken altogether, the poem can be viewed as a study of enumerated contrasts: between the briefness of life and eternity of death, between the numerous rumors and their low worth, between the "profusion" of kisses and the one number that sums them up. Use of language from finance and arithmetic is a consistent theme, with vocabulary like aestimus, assis, conturbabimus, and fecerimus peppered throughout. Through the "manipulation of traditional formulas and quasi-mathematical conceits" used in the poem's structure, Catullus implies strong romantic feelings by his apparent need to calculate and control them.

== Translations and adaptations ==
In 1601, the English composer, poet and physician Thomas Campion wrote this rhyming free translation of the first half (to which he added two verses of his own, and music, to create a lute song):

My sweetest Lesbia, let us live and love;
And though the sager sort our deeds reprove,
Let us not weigh them. Heaven's great lamps do dive
Into their west, and straight again revive,
But soon as once is set our little light,
Then must we sleep one ever-during night.

Ben Jonson drew on the poem in poems 5, "Song. To Celia", and 6, "Song. To the Same" in his collection The Forrest.

Soon thereafter, Sir Walter Raleigh included the following verse, apparently based on Campion's translation, in his The Historie of the World, which he wrote while imprisoned in the Tower of London:

The Sunne may set and rise
But we contrariwise
Sleepe after our short light
One everlasting night.

A 16th-century French translation by Jean-Antoine de Baïf was used by Reynaldo Hahn in the song "Vivons, mignarde, vivons". Also set in French, a translation by Georges Lafaye was composed by Darius Milhaud as song "Ma chérie, aimons‑nous".

Henry Purcell used an anonymous translation in his song "Let us, kind Lesbia, give away" (1684).

Dominick Argento used his English translation in his song "Let us live, my Clodia, and let us love".

== Bibliography ==
- Commager, S (1964). "The Structure of Catullus 5". The Classical Journal. 59: 361–364.
- Fredricksmeyer, EA (1970). "Observations on Catullus 5". American Journal of Philology. 91 (4): 431–445. doi:10.2307/293083. JSTOR 293083.
- Grimm, RE (1963). "Catullus 5 Again". The Classical Journal. 59: 16–21.
- Grummel, WC (1954). "Vivamus, mea Lesbia". Classical Bulletin. 31: 19–21.
- Pratt, NT (1956). "The Numerical Catullus 5". Classical Philology. 51 (2): 99–100. doi:10.1086/364015. S2CID 161200606.
- Segal, C (1968). "Catullus 5 and 7: A Study in Complementaries". American Journal of Philology. 89 (3): 284–301. doi:10.2307/293446. JSTOR 293446.
