= Wilfried Stroh =

German philologist and academic (1939–2025)

- Born: 26 December 1939; Stuttgart, Gau Württemberg-Hohenzollern, Germany
- Died: 15 July 2025 (aged 85); Munich, Bavaria, Germany
- Education: University of Tübingen; Heidelberg University
- Occupations: Philologist educator

Wilfried Stroh (26 December 1939 – 15 July 2025) was a German philologist and academic.

== Life and career ==
Born in Stuttgart on 26 December 1939, Stroh was the son of Hans Leopold Stroh and Rosemarie Wendel. He attended the University of Tübingen, LMU Munich, and the University of Vienna before earning a doctorate from Heidelberg University. His work primarily focused on Roman poetry and rhetoric, particularly Cicero. He published numerous works on the history of the Latin language and the history of rhetoric in Antiquity. He was heavily involved with the promotion of spoken Latin and encouraging the oral and sung practice of the language. His wide array of published works aimed to keep Latin alive in contemporary culture.

Wilfried Stroh died in Munich on 15 July 2025, at the age of 85.

== Works ==
- Ovid im Urteil der Nachwelt. Eine Testimoniensammlung (1969)
- Die römische Liebeselegie als werbende Dichtung (1971)
- Taxis und Taktik. Die advokatische Dispositionskunst in Ciceros Gerichtsreden (1972)
- Amor in Monte Docto. Gott Amor auf dem Domberg (1987)
- Apocrypha. Entlegene Schriften (2000)
- Musica poetica Latina. De versibus Latinis modulandis. Eine musikalische Lateinpoetik (2001)
- Baldeana. Untersuchungen zum Lebenswerk von Bayerns größtem Dichter (2004)
- Latein ist tot, es lebe Latein! Kleine Geschichte einer großen Sprache (2007)
- Proben lateinischer Verskunst (2007)
- Cicero. Redner, Staatsmann, Philosoph (2008)
- Die Macht der Rede. Eine kleine Geschichte der Rhetorik im alten Griechenland und Rom (2009)
- Christus und Cupido. Embleme aus Jacob Baldes Poetenklasse von 1628 (2012)
- Divus Augustus. Der erste römische Kaiser und seine Welt (2014)
