= T. P. Wiseman =

English classical scholar (born 1940)

Professor Timothy Peter Wiseman FBA
- Born: 3 February 1940 (age 86)
- Occupation: Classical scholar
- Awards: Kenyon Medal

Academic background
- Education: Manchester Grammar School; Balliol College, Oxford
- Thesis: Italian Senators: 139 B.C. – A.D. 14. (1967)

Academic work
- Institutions: University of Leicester; University of Exeter
- Notable students: J. K. Rowling

Timothy Peter Wiseman FBA (born 3 February 1940), who usually publishes as T. P. Wiseman and is named as Peter Wiseman in other sources, is a classical scholar and professor emeritus of the University of Exeter. He has published numerous books and articles, primarily on the literature and the social and political history of the late Roman Republic, but also the mythography of early Rome and Roman theatre.

Among Wiseman's students at Exeter was J. K. Rowling, about whose encounters with ancient authors he has written. Because of his connection with Rowling, Wiseman attracted brief pop-culture notoriety when media speculated that he was a model for the character of Albus Dumbledore in the Harry Potter series of books and movies.

== Early life and education ==
Wiseman was educated at the Manchester Grammar School, an all-boys private school in Manchester. He studied Literae Humaniores (classics) at Balliol College, Oxford, graduating with a Bachelor of Arts (BA) degree. He stayed at Balliol to undertake a Doctor of Philosophy (DPhil) degree, which he completed in 1967 with a doctoral thesis titled Italian Senators: 139 B.C. – A.D. 14.

== Academic career ==
From 1963 to 1976, Wiseman was a lecturer in classics at the University of Leicester. He was an assistant lecturer from 1963 to 1965, lecturer from 1965 to 1973, and Reader in Roman History from 1973 to 1976. While at Leicester, he spent a year teaching at the University of Toronto as a visiting associate professor from 1970 to 1971.

In 1977, he moved to the University of Exeter where he had been appointed Professor of Classics. He was head of the Department of Classics and Ancient History until 1990. He was Whitney J. Oates Fellow at Princeton University in 1988 and 2008. He retired from Exeter in 2001 and made emeritus professor.

Wiseman and his wife, Anne, also a classicist, have been married since 1962. The two collaborated on a translation of Julius Caesar's Gallic War commentaries published in 1980.

The conference "Myth, History, and Performance: A Celebration of the Work of T.P. Wiseman" was held at Exeter in March 2000 and was the basis for the book Myth, History, and Culture in Republican Rome: Studies in Honour of T.P. Wiseman (2003). In 2004, Wiseman's book The Myths of Rome won the Goodwin Award of Merit from the American Philological Association and was nominated for the British Academy Book Prize.

He was elected a Fellow of the British Academy in 1986 and served as its vice-president in 1992–94. In 2022, he was awarded the British Academy's Kenyon Medal "for his enormous contributions to the fields of Roman history and literature".

=== Assessment ===
In a review of Remembering the Roman People (2009), Mary Beard commented on Wiseman's methodology in trying to tease out a view of Roman populist politics from elite-dominated sources:

To find what he is looking for, Wiseman must read the sources against the grain, searching out hints of a different view of events, and looking for the cracks in the conservative story through which a glimpse of a popular tradition might be seen. He must look beyond the accounts of surviving ancient authors to the alternative versions that they were (consciously or unconsciously) concealing. In doing this, he not only depends on a rare familiarity with Roman literature, from the mainstream to its remotest byways, but also on a capacity for bold historical speculation that takes him right to the edge of (and in some cases beyond) what the surviving evidence can reliably tell us.

== The Harry Potter connection ==
Wiseman was a teacher of J.K. Rowling when she was a student at Exeter from 1983 to 1986. In 2000, when Rowling was presented with an honorary doctorate from Exeter, Wiseman gave the introductory speech. In 2002, he published the article "At Figulus … : J.K. Rowling and the ancient world," in which he presents, in his words, "the only accurate account of what ancient authors Harry Potter's creator encountered when she was a student at Exeter." The title refers to Nigidius Figulus, the friend of Cicero who was a praetor and Pythagorean scholar in the 1st century BC and took on a legendary status in the later European magic tradition; figulus is the Latin word for "potter."

Media, including daily newspapers and blogs, have speculated that Wiseman inspired the creation of the character Albus Dumbledore. The Scotsman published a protracted comparison of the real-life professor and the fictional wizard, headmaster of Hogwarts School of Witchcraft and Wizardry:

- Imposing, tall and thin figures with twinkling eyes and white whiskers;
- Academic leaders who are renowned for their serenity and gentle wisdom as well as their formidable intellects;
- Possessed of whimsical wit and paternal demeanour, commanding reverence and respect from generations of students;
- Have a sweet tooth and a predilection for enjoying confectionery between lectures.

Whether or not this comparison was meant to be tongue-in-cheek (Wiseman debunked the last point by declaring that he has "a rather dry taste; bitter beer, dry white wine"), it has been picked up not only in fan blogs and other websites, but by newspapers such as The Independent and by the BBC. A writer for The Guardian noted that Rowling "studied classics and French at Exeter University and is rumoured to have based Dumbledore on the splendidly bearded Peter Wiseman, Exeter's classics professor emeritus." Wiseman again demurred at the identification in a letter to the editor:

My beard makes no pretensions to splendour – and it was black (Snape's colouring, not Dumbledore's) when JKR was a student at Exeter.

== List of selected works ==
- "The Ambitions of Quintus Cicero." Journal of Roman Studies 56 (1966) 108–115.
- Catullan Questions (1969).
- New Men in the Roman Senate (1971).
- "Legendary Genealogies in Late-Republican Rome." Greece & Rome 21 (1974) 153–164.
- Cinna the Poet (1974).
- Clio's Cosmetics: Three Studies in Greco-Roman Literature (1979), limited preview online.
- The Battle for Gaul, a translation of Caesar's Bellum Gallicum with Anne Wiseman (1980).
- Catullus and His World (1985), limited preview online.
- Roman Political Life (1985).
- Roman Studies Literary and Historical (1987).
- A Short History of the British School at Rome (1990).
- Flavius Josephus: Death of an Emperor (1991), translation of Josephus's account of Caligula's assassination and commentary, limited preview online.
- Talking to Virgil (1992), limited preview online.
- Historiography and Imagination (1994).
- Remus: A Roman Myth (1995), limited preview online.
- "The Publication of De Bello Gallico." In Julius Caesar as Artful Reporter: The War Commentaries as Political Instruments. Edited by Kathryn Welch and Anton Powell. Classical Press of Wales, 1998.
- Roman Drama and Roman History (1998).
- “History, Poetry, and Annales.” In Clio and the Poets: Augustan Poetry and the Traditions of Ancient Historiography. Edited by D.S. Levine and D.P. Nelis. Leiden: Brill, 2002, pp. 331–362, limited preview online.
- 'At Figulus ... : J.K. Rowling and the Ancient World." The Classical Outlook 79 (2002) 93–96.
- The Myths of Rome (2004).
- "Roman History and the Ideological Vacuum," in Classics in Progress: Essays on Greece and Rome (Oxford University Press, 2006), pp. 285–310. limited preview online.
- Unwritten Rome (2008).
- Remembering the Roman People (2009), limited preview online.
- The House of Augustus: A Historical Detective Story (2019).
