= Broteas =

In Greek mythology, Broteas (Ancient Greek: Βροτέας, lit. 'mortal' or 'man') was the man who from a desire of death burned himself on a pyre.

== Mythology ==
The mythic rationale, that Broteas was a famous hunter who refused to honour Artemis and bragged that fire could not hurt him. The goddess then drove him mad, causing him to immolate himself. He can be compared to the hunter Actaeon, whose sacrifice is also justified as retribution.

Though the Scholiasts on Ovid described Broteas either as a son of Jupiter (Zeus), or as a son of Vulcan (Hephaestus) and Pallas (Athena), identical with Erichthonius. According to one of the Scholiasts, Broteas, the son of Zeus, was a very wicked man who was blinded by his father and loathing his life threw himself on a burning pyre. Meanwhile, the other Scholiasts recounted that Broteas, the son of Hephaestus and Athena, was despised for his ugliness and this so preyed on his mind that he preferred death by fire.

It seems not improbable that this legend contains a reminiscence of a human sacrifice or suicide by fire, such as occurs not infrequently in the traditions of western Asia and for the Asiatic traditions of a human sacrifice or suicide by fire.

== Brotheus and Renaissance invective ==
In literature of the Renaissance and later, Broteas is most often called "Brotheus" and described as a son of Vulcan who cast himself into the flames, sometimes specified as those of Mount Aetna, because of his deformity. The immediate source for the Renaissance trope of Brotheus and his self-immolation was Ovid's curse poem Ibis, an erudite rant of gruesome threats cataloguing the fates of numerous mythic and historical figures. Ovid's reference is minimal: "May you consign your body parts, set on fire, to the pyre to be cremated, as they say Broteas did out of a desire for death."

The Italian humanist and literary agitator Domizio Calderini, also known in Latin as Domitius Calderinus, appended the Ibis to his annotated edition of Martial (1474). Calderini's note says that Brotheus was the son of Vulcan and Minerva; scorned because of his ugliness, he cast himself into a burning pyre. The same year, drawing on his classical sources, Calderini published a Defensio adversus Brotheum ("Defense against Brotheus"), an attack on his literary rivals Angelo Sabino and Niccolò Perotti under the pseudonyms "Fidentinus," after the plagiarist in Book 1 of Martial's epigrams, and "Brotheus." The literary feud is mentioned in several sources, including Gyraldus, and its notoriety helped establish the predominant version of the myth in the 15th–18th centuries.

The idiosyncratic but enormously influential Mythologiae of Natalis Comes (1567) uses this version in a chapter on the aspects of Vulcan and his progeny: "Brotheus, who was mocked by everyone because of his ill-formed appearance, hurled himself into the fire, as if to escape libel by death." This description is repeated closely in The Anatomy of Melancholy (1621) by Robert Burton, and early 19th-century versions of Samuel Johnson's Dictionary specify that Brotheus "threw himself into Mount Ætna."

== 21st-century Brotheus ==
Broteas, under the Renaissance spelling Brotheus, is also a character in "Anakhronismos," a long-form poem with mock annotations by Mike Ladd. In the poem, Brotheus is called a philosopher and attends the cinema with the poem's speaker, the fictional Aponius Maso. The note identifies Brotheus as the "deformed son of Vulcan and Minerva who burned himself because of the ridicule he suffered."
