= Ibis (Ovid) =

Curse poem by the Roman poet Ovid

Ovid's Ibis is a highly artificial and history-bound product and does not make pleasant reading. But it is interesting, among other things, because it illustrates the writer's propensity for moving on more than one plane of reality. The poem contains elements from three distinct modes of reacting to the same outrage; of these, the first may be called realistic, the second romantic, and the third grotesque.

— Hermann Fränkel, Ovid: A Poet
between Two Worlds

Ibis is a curse poem by the Roman poet Ovid, written during his years in exile at the port of Tomis on the Black Sea (AD 8–14). It is "a stream of violent but extremely learned abuse", modeled on a lost poem of the same title by the Greek Alexandrian poet Callimachus.

== Identity of Ibis ==
The object of the poet's curses is left unnamed except for the pseudonym "Ibis", and no scholarly consensus has been reached concerning the figure to whom this pseudonym might refer. Gaius Ateius Capito, Hyginus, Cassius Severus, Titus Labienus, Thrasyllus of Mendes, Caninius Rebilus, Ovid's erstwhile friend Sabinus, and the emperor Augustus have all been proposed, as well as the possibility that "Ibis" might refer to more than one person, to nobody at all, or even to Ovid's own poetry.

It was conjectured by the Belgian scholar Raoul Verdière that Tristia 3.11 and 5.8, which like Ibis (line 40) address an anonymous enemy of Ovid with the word improbe 'shameless', were written in admonishment of the same person, a former friend of Ovid who dropped him when Ovid was relegated. Noting that the final letters of Tristia 5.8.1–4 read Atei, Verdière suggested that the person anonymously mentioned was the jurist Gaius Ateius Capito. Subsequently another Belgian scholar, Lucien Janssens, discovered acrostics and a telestic containing the names Ateius Capito in both Tristia 5.11 and in Ibis, which, if correct, would confirm Verdière's conjecture.

== Structure and themes ==
The 644-line poem, like all Ovid's extant work except the Metamorphoses, is written in elegiac couplets. It is thus an unusual, though not unique, example of invective poetry in antiquity written in elegiac form rather than the more common iambics or hendecasyllabics. The incantatory nature of the curses in the Ibis has sometimes led to comparisons with curse tablets (defixiones), though Ovid's are elaborately literary in expression; the poem has also been seen as a type of devotio.

Drawing on the encyclopedic store of knowledge he demonstrated in the Metamorphoses and his other work — presumably from memory, as he purportedly had few books with him in exile — Ovid threatens his enemy in the second section of the poem (lines 251–638) with a veritable catalogue of "gruesome and mutually incompatible fates" that befell various figures from myth and history, including laming, blinding, cannibalism, and death by pine cone. Ovid also declares in the poem's opening salvo that even if he dies in exile, his ghost will rise and rend Ibis's flesh.

The basic structure of the poem is as follows:

I. Introduction

1–66: Proem which lays out Ibis' crime and declares war
67–126: Prayers to the gods to inflict on Ibis poverty, hunger, and exile
127–208: The eternity of Ibis' torment, which will outlast both Ovid's death and Ibis' own
209–250: A biography of Ibis' infancy and a divine mandate given to Ovid to curse him

II. Catalogue

251–638: Catalogue of mythological and historical torments which Ibis should suffer

III. Coda

639–644: Promise of an iambic followup should Ibis not cease and desist

== Afterlife ==
The Ibis attracted a large number of scholia and was widely disseminated and referenced in Renaissance literature. In his annotated translation (1577), Thomas Underdowne found in Ibis a reference guide to "all manner of vices punished, all offenses corrected, and all misdeeds revenged." An English translator noted that "a full reference to each of the allusions to be found in this poem would suffice to fill a small volume."

== Online texts and translations ==
The editio princeps of Ovid's complete works, including the Ibis, was published in Italy in 1471. Full-text versions of the following Latin editions and English translations of the Ibis are available online.

=== Latin ===
- R. Ellis, P. Ovidii Nasonis Ibis, Oxford Classical Text, 1881.
- A. Riese, P. Ovidii Nasonis Carmina, vol. 3, 1899.

=== English translations ===
- Henry Thomas Riley, "The Invective Against the Ibis," prose, 1885.
- A. S. Kline, "Ovid - Ibis," Poetry in Translation, 2003

== See also ==
- Libel as a genre of invective poetry
