= Angelo Sabino =

15th-century Italian humanist and poet

Angelo Sabino or in Latin Angelus Sabinus (fl. 1460s–1470s) was an Italian Renaissance humanist, poet laureate, classical philologist, Ovidian impersonator, and putative rogue.

Sabino's real name was probably Angelo Sani di Cure, with the toponymic indicating that he was from Cure or Curi (ancient Cures), in formerly Sabine territory, hence his Latin appellation Sabinus. He wrote under a multitude of pen names, including Aulus Sabinus when he impersonated the Sabinus who was Ovid's friend, and Angelus Gnaeus Quirinus Sabinus, an allusion to Quirinus as an originally Sabine god of war in ancient Rome.

== As poet ==
Sabino advertised himself as a poet laureate on the title pages of his editions of ancient texts. It is unclear in whose court he held the position, or in what year, though one scholar conjectured 1469. At any rate, he was identified as such in the period 1469–1474, following the composition of his historical epic De excidio civitatis Leodiensis ("The Fall of the City of Liège"). Written in Latin hexameters and structured in six books, this 6,000-line poem gives historical background and narrates the siege, capture and destruction of Liège, in present-day Belgium, by Louis XI of France and Charles the Bold of Burgundy. Its subject matter was more expansive than the title might indicate, as the De excidio also includes a description of Charles' wedding to Margaret of York.

Sabino composed the poem at the request of Onofrio de Santa Croce, the papal legate who traveled to Liège in 1467 in an effort to negotiate a peace settlement. Onofrio failed in his embassy, and Sabino's poem was meant to provide an emotive and narrative context for understanding the conflict; or, as Onofrio himself acknowledged in his memoirs, the De excidio was an effort to justify his own conduct in the matter. Jozef IJsewijn thinks that Onofrio had taken Sabino with him to Liège and Maastricht, but elsewhere it is assumed that Onofrio commissioned the poem after his return. Whether or not the poet had firsthand knowledge, the De excidio is considered a significant historical source on the siege, and was used as such by the early 20th-century historian Godefroid Kurth throughout his classic La Cité de Liège au Moyen-Age. Sabino's epic was never published in his lifetime, as it soon lost its patrons and immediate purpose. Pope Paul II, for whom it was originally intended, died in 1471; Onofrio himself died without having returned to good standing in the papal court.

When Onofrio had traveled back to Rome from the Low Countries, he brought along the young Matthaeus Herbenus of Maastricht, a future historian, grammarian, and musician. Herbenus became a student of Niccolò Perotti, a friend of Sabino with whose name he was to become most closely associated. It was Herbenus who first brought the De excidio into wider circulation upon returning to his northern home, where its subject matter held more direct interest. He sent copies to Henry of Bergen, bishop of Cambrai, for whom Erasmus later served as secretary, and Lambert d'Oupeye, chancellor of the prince-bishop of Liège. The network through which Sabino's poem circulated is an example, if minor, of how Renaissance humanism proliferated.

Herbenus added a short poem and a prose prologue of his own. The manuscript for d'Oupeye ends with short argumenta or summaries of each book, composed by Paschacius Berselius (d. 1535), a Benedictine monk of St. Laurent's abbey near Liège.

The literary critic and poet Henri Bebel (d. ca. 1516), who advised readers to avoid stories that lack beauty and charm, listed Sabino among notable recent writers who ought to be taken seriously. Sabino called himself a vates, the Latin word meaning both "poet" and "prophet," divinely inspired to speak. Poets of the Augustan era sometimes assumed the persona of the vates, for instance Ovid in his Fasti. "Unfortunately," noted an early 20th-century historian who drew on Sabino's poem, "miraculous intervention, borrowed from paganism, long speeches and long poetic descriptions make it an exhausting read."

== As educator ==
In the fall of 1472, Sabino was offered a three-year appointment as master of the grammar school of Viterbo at an annual salary of 100 ducats, but he declined. He was a professor of rhetoric sometime in the early 1470s at the Studium Urbi. The English classical scholar William Lilye attended Sabino's lectures on grammar and rhetoric, as well as those of Sulpitius Verulanus and Pomponio Leto. By September 1474, for reasons that are unclear, Sabino was no longer a university professor.

== Literary feud ==
On 9 August 1474, Georg Sachsel and Bartholomæus Golsh published Sabino's commentary on the ancient Roman satirist Juvenal (Paradoxa in Iuvenalem), which he dedicated to his friend Niccolò Perotti. About the Paradoxa a 19th-century editor remarked "these commentaries are not lacking in insight and wit, but one looks for critical judgment and taste in vain. Consequently he [Sabino] strikes us as having fairly limited value for understanding the author."

According to Gyraldus and others, Sabino and Perotti were assailed by the irascible Domizio Calderini, who produced an edition of Juvenal the same year. Although Sabino's Paradoxa had been written long before they were published, Calderini attacked their editor as "Fidentinus", after the plagiarist in Martial's epigrams, and Perotti as "Brotheus", the son of Vulcan who threw himself into the fire because his imperfections exposed him to ridicule. Some sources identify Sabino as Brotheus, and Calderini may have used the nickname for both. Calderini had published an edition of Martial, to which he appended an annotated text of Ovid's gruesomely erudite curse poem Ibis, the source for the obscure figure Brotheus.

In the course of this literary feud, Calderini came to regard Sabino as one of his most bitter enemies, though hardly his only one. He accused Sabino of stealing the work of his students, admittedly not an unheard-of practice, while professor at the Studium Urbi. In his Defensio adversus Brotheum, which he attached to his own commentary on Juvenal, Calderini implies more than poor pedagogy when he says that Sabino (sub nomine Fidentinus) "teaches boys in the wrong way every day." The feud is also referred to in the Dialogue of Learned Men by Paul Cortese.

== Text critic ==
Sabino is credited with the editio princeps of the historian Ammianus Marcellinus, working from the manuscript Vaticanus Regiensis 1994. Sabino preserved the copyists' mistakes and the lacunae in the manuscript, a philosophy the text's subsequent editor did not share, instead favoring often baseless emendations. It was published 7 June 1474, by Sachsel and Golsh, under the name Angelus Eneus Sabinus. Sabino also edited the 2nd-century BC playwright Terence (1472), whose verse comedies he arranged as prose, and the early Christian theologian Lactantius (1474).

== Ovidian impersonations ==
Sabino is most often noted for his Ovidian forgeries. Renaissance editions of Ovid's Heroïdes, a collection of verse epistles each written in the person of a legendary woman to her absent male lover, include three poems attributed to A. Sabinus or "Aulus Sabinus, a celebrated Roman knight (eques) and poet." Ovid refers twice in his poetry to his friend Sabinus. He says that Sabinus wrote answers to six of the Heroïdes, which he enumerates as Ulysses to Penelope, in response to Heroïdes 1; Hippolytus to Phaedra (H. 4); Aeneas to Dido (H. 7); Demophoon to Phyllis (H. 2); Jason to Hypsipyle (H. 6); and Phaon to Sappho (H. 15). In his last letter from exile, Ovid refers again to Sabinus and mentions the letter from Ulysses.

Sabino took two of his imitations from this list, the letters from Ulysses and Demophoon, and added a third from Paris to Oenone, corresponding to Heroïdes 5. The three epistles continued to be published in editions of the Heroïdes as the authentic work of Ovid's friend until the era of post-Enlightenment literary studies, and can be found in some collections into the 1800s, long after Sabino had been revealed as the author.

Thomas Salusbury translated Sabino's three imitations of the Heroïdes into English, which can be found in a 1795 anthology of Ovid's verse epistles. Salusbury accepts the praenomen Aulus as the correct form of the ancient Sabinus's name and the poems as authentic, asserting that they express "a true poetic genius." He also says that they are included in "all the late and best editions. A separate epistle from Ulysses, also attributed to a Sabinus, appears in another humanist manuscript, and may be an earlier work by Sabino, or an effort by another imitator.

Sabino's authorship of the poems was detected, though not definitively proven, by J. G. Weller in 1763. But the three poems were in fact not intended to be "forgeries," as Sabino presented his authorship as a tease rather than a hoax. He had even identified himself as the author of Heroides imitations in his introduction to the Paradoxa. Dangling another clue, Sabino departed from Ovid's original list of poems by Sabinus and substituted a letter from the Trojan prince Paris.

The assumption of Latin or Greek identities by Renaissance men of letters was common, and adopting an Ovidian persona in writing Neo-Latin poetry had been a literary pose since the Middle Ages. As Peter E. Knox notes in A Companion to Ovid:

By observing classical norms in meter and diction and drawing on literary and mythographic resources, scholars such as Sabinus employed imitation as a means of working toward interpretation. Imposture was almost certainly not Sabinus' goal: he refers to his responses to Ovid's Heroides in the dedicatory letter of his Paradoxa dated 1467. Rather like similarly inspired efforts to flesh out and make sense of the narratives of classical literature — Maffeo Vegio's thirteenth book of the Aeneid … comes to mind — Sabinus takes up the implicit challenge of re-imagining Ovid. … Sabinus sought to interpret Ovid by reconfiguring his work, a form of reception that Ovid's works still inspire in contemporary artists and writers.

A few scholars have attempted to argue that the problematic letter from Sappho to Phaon in the Heroïdes, the authenticity of which as a work by Ovid has often been doubted, was another of Sabino's efforts.

Sabino had been one of the few poets inclined to question Penelope's utter chastity during her husband's two-decade absence, albeit through the voice of Ulysses himself, on the grounds that he must have wondered. The popularity of the Heroides edition containing Sabino's impersonations contributed to later portrayals that raise the question.

== Names ==
Following is a list, perhaps not comprehensive, of the many names under which Sabino can be found as author of his own work, in references by his contemporaries and historical sources, and in modern scholarship.

- Angelo Sabino and Angelus Sabinus, the most common forms of his name, the former Italian and the latter Latin.
- Angelus de Curribus Sabinis, "Angelo of Sabine Cures," as author of the De excidio; also de Curibus.
- A. Sabinus or Aulus Sabinus, as author of the three Ovidian verse epistles.
- Fidentinus, the pseudonym under which he was attacked by Calderini, and Brotheus, though the latter is used more often for Perotti.
- Ange de Viterbe, a French form used for the author of the De excidio linked to his time spent in Viterbo, not to be confused with at least one other Ange de Viterbe from the 14th century, nor with Annio da Viterbo, a fabricator of ancient texts.
- Angiolo Sabino, as author of the De excidio in Tiraboschi's Storia della letteratura italiana and others.
- Angelus Gnaeus Quirinus Sabinus or Cneus
- Angelus Eneus Sabinus, for his edition of Ammianus Marcellinus; it is unclear whether either Cneus or Eneus is an error for the other name, or whether each is a separate nom de plume.
- Angelus Croeus Sabinus, with Croeus possibly an error for Cnaeus, Cneus or Eneus.

== Selected bibliography ==
- Bacha, Eugène. "Deux écrits de Mathieu Herbenus sur la destruction de Liège par Charles-le-Téméraire." Bulletin de la Commission Royale d'Histoire (de la Belgique) 75 (1907) 385–390. Full text (in French) online.
- IJsewijn, Jozef. "The Coming of Humanism to the Low Countries." In Itinerarium Italicum: The Profile of the Italian Renaissance in the Mirror of Its European Transformations. Leiden: Brill, 1975, pp. 193–304. Limited preview online.
- Lancetti, Vincenzo. Memorie intorno ai poeti laureati d'ogni tempo e d'ogni nazione. Milan, 1839, pp. 170–172. Full text (in Italian) online.
- Lee, Egmont. Sixtus IV and Men of Letters. Rome 1978. Limited preview online.
- Meckelnborg, Christina, with Bernd Schneider. Odyssea Responsio Ulixis ad Penelopen: Die humanistische Odyssea decurtata der Berliner Handschrift Diez. B. Sant. 41. Leipzig, 2002. Presents the text of the separate Letter from Ulysses with introduction and commentary. Limited preview (in German) online.
