= Codex Romanus =

Codex Romanus may refer to:

- Codex Vaticanus Ottobonianus Latinus 1829, a manuscript of Catullus
- Vergilius Romanus (Codex Vaticanus Latinus 3867), an illuminated manuscript of Vergil's Aeneid

== See also ==
- Codex Vaticanus
