= Catullus 16 =

Poem by Gaius Valerius Catullus

Catullus 16 or Carmen 16 is a poem by Gaius Valerius Catullus (c. 84 BC – c. 54 BC). The poem, written in a hendecasyllabic (11-syllable) meter, was considered to be so sexually explicit following its rediscovery in the following centuries that a full English translation was not published until the 20th century. The first line, Pēdīcābō ego vōs et irrumābō ('I will sodomize and face-fuck you'), sometimes used as a title, has been called "one of the filthiest expressions ever written in Latin—or in any other language".

Carmen 16 is significant in literary history not only as an artistic work censored for its obscenity, but also because the poem raises questions about the proper relation of the poet, or his life, to the work. Subsequent Latin poets referenced the poem not for its invective, but as a work exemplary of freedom of speech and obscene subject matter that challenged the culturally prevalent decorum or moral orthodoxy of the period. Ovid, Pliny the Younger, Martial, and Apuleius all invoked the authority of Catullus in asserting that while the poet himself should be a respectable person, his poetry should not be constrained.

== Censored editions ==
Several editions of Catullus' works omit the more explicit parts of the poem. A noteworthy example is the 1924 Loeb edition: this omits lines 1 and 2 from the English translation, but includes them in the Latin; lines 7–14 are omitted from both Latin and English; a later Loeb edition gives the complete text in both languages. Other editions have been published with the explicit words blanked out.

NPR bleep censored the first line of Catullus 16, both in Latin and English translation in the radiophonic exchange between Guy Raz and Mary Beard in 2009. C. H. Sisson writes "the obscenity of Catullus has long been a stumbling block". He follows Loeb, omitting poem lines as non-sequitur:

because it seems to me that the poem is better without them (the last eight lines). In the shorter version, Catullus is making a point (as always): the additional lines are probably spurious. It is unlike Catullus to exalt the pornographic quality of what he wrote; his mind was too much on his subject.

Thomas Nelson Winter notes: "In the sense that this is the normal language of those to whom he directs the poem, it is not obscene. Obscenity, like beauty, is in the eyes of the beholder".

== Social and literary context ==
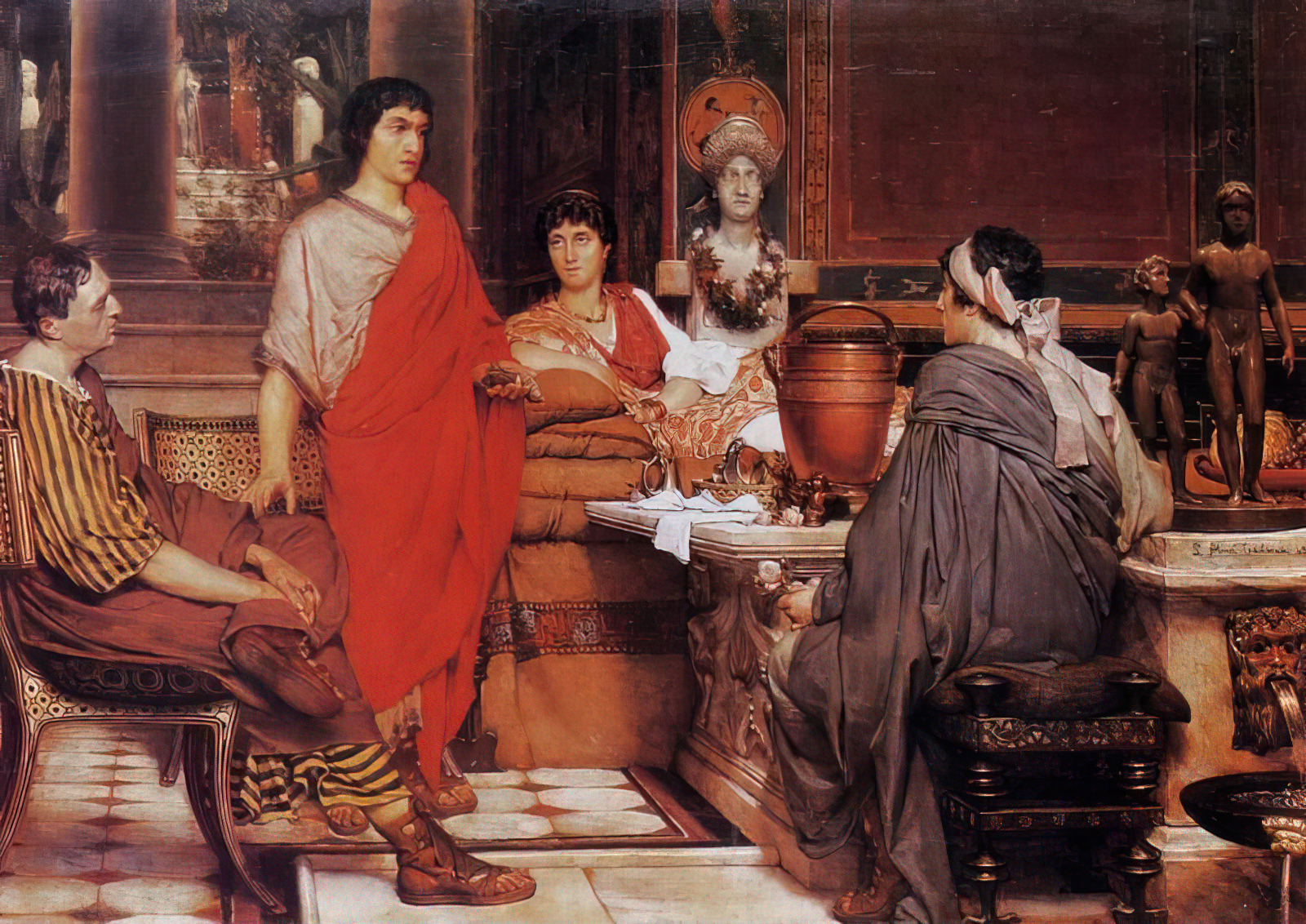
Catullus (left-center) by Alma-Tadema

The poem raises questions about the proper relation of the poet, or his life, to the work. Catullus addresses the poem to two men, Furius and Aurelius. Furius refers to Marcus Furius Bibaculus, a first-century BC poet who had an affair with Juventius, for whom Catullus had an unrequited passion. Aurelius is speculated to refer to Marcus Aurelius Cotta, praetor in 54 BC.

Those two men either together or singly also appear in so called Catullus' Furius and Aurelius "cycle", in poems 11, 15, 21, 23, 24 and 26. The cycle considers sexual themes and with the exception of Catullus 11 uses an abusive language toward the two. The two are described elsewhere as fellow members of Catullus' cohort of friends: comites Catulli. According to Catullus 16, Furius and Aurelius find Catullus's verses to be molliculi ("tender" or "delicate"), implicating that the author is an effeminate poet. According to T. P. Wiseman, Catullus speaks about himself in feminine terms even in his love poetry. Catullus's gentle attitude left him vulnerable in the cynical and cruel environment of Roman high society. The criticism of Furius and Aurelius was directed at Catullus 5, apparently from "many thousands of kisses" at line 13. Kenneth Quinn observes:

16.12 comes closest to the words of Poem 5, especially at 5.10. Comparing these two lines makes it extremely tempting to ascribe the reference to Poem 5 and to Poem 5 alone, especially since this assumption explains neatly the accusation, defense, and counter-accusation of Poem 16.

Catullus maligns the two and threatens them with rape. According to T. P. Wiseman, Catullus used the obscenity to get his message that "soft" poetry could be more arousing than explicit description to "sensibilities so much cruder than his own". According to Thomas Nelson Winter, Catullus could still claim that he has a pure life (79.16), despite the self evidence of pederasty (poems 14, 109) and his love of a married woman (poem 83 mentions Lesbia's husband).

Apparently Catullus and his contemporaries believed a man could do almost anything sexually and remain respectable, so long as he stayed within the masculine role. Thus Catullus' insistence on his own propriety and on his potent manhood is all one. Catullus is a proper man.

Craig Arthur Williams says Catullus 16 demonstrates that in Roman ideology of masculine vir, a man is not compromised by his penetration of other males, in fact his manhood status is bolstered. Mary Beard finds the poem's message to be ironic:

You can't tell a man from his verses. And 'pedicabo ego vos et irrumabo' for saying you can. But the joke is (or rather one of the jokes in this complicated little poem)—if you can't infer from his kiss-y verses that [Catullus] is effeminate, then neither can you infer from his poetic threats of violent penetration that he is capable of that either.

== Latin text and translation ==
Latin reading of Catullus 16

External audio
- Catullus 16 (English), read by Louis Zukofsky, PennSound

Line	Latin text	English trans.	Idiomatic American Eng. trans.
1	Pēdīcābō ego vōs et irrumābō,	I will sodomize you and face-fuck you,	Fuck you, boys, up the butt and in the mouth,
2	Aurēlī pathice et cinaede Fūrī,	bottom Aurelius and catamite Furius,	you queer Aurelius and you fag Furius!
3	quī mē ex versiculīs meīs putāstis,	you who think, because my poems	You size me up, on the basis of my poems,
4	quod sunt molliculī, parum pudīcum.	are sensitive, that I have no shame.	because they're a little sexy, as not really decent.
5	Nam castum esse decet pium poētam	For it's proper for a devoted poet to be moral	A poet has to live clean—
6	ipsum, versiculōs nihil necesse est;	himself, [but] in no way is it necessary for his poems.	but not his poems.
7	quī tum dēnique habent salem ac lepōrem,	In point of fact, these have wit and charm,	They only have spice and charm,
8	sī sint molliculī ac parum pudīcī	if they are sensitive and a little shameless,	if somewhat sexy and really not for children—
9	et quod prūriat incitāre possunt,	and can arouse an itch,	if, in fact, they cause body talk
10	nōn dīcō puerīs, sed hīs pilōsīs	and I don't mean in boys, but in those hairy old men	(I'm not talking in teenagers, but in hairy old men
11	quī dūrōs nequeunt movēre lumbōs.	who can't get it up. (Note: Literally, "who can't get their inflexible loins to move." Although lumbus, singular, can sometimes be a euphemism for the penis, in the classical Latin of Catullus, the plural form "in sexual contexts … for the most part occurs in descriptions of the movements of seduction or copulation," notes J.N. Adams, citing multiple examples, including this line, "where it should be taken in its original sense," that is, the loins. Durus, "hard," is thus a reference to the physical inflexibility of the aging body, not to the rigidity of the penis. Some English translators, however, find the predicament best expressed by the older male's difficulty in achieving an erection.)	who can barely move their stiff bums).
12	Vōs, quod mīlia multa bāsiōrum	Because you've read my countless kisses, (Note: Literally, "many thousands of kisses," usually taken as a reference to Carmina 5, Vivamus mea Lesbia atque amemus, and 7, Quaeris quot mihi basiationes.)	But you, because you happen to read about "many thousands of kisses,"
13	lēgistis male mē marem putātis?	you think less of me as a man?	you think I'm not a man?
14	Pēdīcābō ego vōs et irrumābō.	I will sodomize you and face-fuck you.	Fuck you, boys, up the butt and in the mouth!

== Sexual terminology ==
Latin is an exact language for obscene acts, such as pedicabo and irrumabo, which appear in the first and last lines of the poem. The term pedicare is a transitive verb, meaning to 'insert one's penis into another person's anus'. The term pathicus in line 2 refers to the 'bottom' person in that act, i.e., the one being penetrated. The term irrumare is likewise a transitive verb, meaning to 'insert one's penis into another person's mouth for suckling', and derives from the Latin word rūma, meaning 'udder' (as in: 'to give something to suck on'). A male who suckles a penis is denoted as a fellator or, equivalently, a pathicus (line 2). Catullus neither confirms nor denies the claim of Aurelius and Furius that he is "not a man", since, while the terms irrumare and pedicare have the literal meanings of sexual acts (that is, to receive fellatio and to bugger), they could also be employed as simple vulgarities meaning as little as go to hell.

== Pedagogy ==
Paul Allen Miller, Professor of Comparative Literature and Classics at the University of South Carolina, suggests Catullus 16 contains information regarding:

1. the historical mutability of socially accepted behavior
2. the constructed nature of sexual identity
3. the nature and function of gender
4. the omnipresence and play of both power and resistance
5. the admonitory and optative function of poetic art

== Musical settings ==
The poem is included as the sixteenth movement of Michael Linton's seventeen movement "Carmina Catulli", a song-cycle for bass-baritone and piano.
