= Domizio Calderini =

Italian humanist

- Portrait of Domizio Calderini, 1521-1552, Pinacoteca Civica di Palazzo Volpi, Como
- Born: Domenico Calderini; 1446; Torri del Benaco, Republic of Venice
- Died: June 1478 (aged 31–32); Rome, Papal States
- Occupation: Renaissance humanist

Domizio Calderini (Latin: Domitius Caldarinus; 1446 – June 1478) was an Italian Renaissance humanist and philologist.

== Life ==
Born in Torri del Benaco, Verona, in 1446, Calderini received his early education from Antonio Brognoligo in Verona. Around 1464, he moved to Venice to study under Benedetto Brugnoli. Two years later, he relocated to Rome, where he became secretary to Cardinal Bessarion and was appointed professor of rhetoric and Greek at the Studium Urbis. Over the next eight years Calderini established a reputation which for a while stood very high, even though it was soon eclipsed by his early death in 1478, and by the rising fame of Poliziano and Ermolao Barbaro. Calderini lectured with conspicuous success on a number of Latin authors. His students included Aldus Manutius, Marcus Antonius Coccius Sabellicus and Pietro Marso. In 1471, Calderini was appointed an apostolic secretary and the following year he accompanied Bessarion on a diplomatic journey to France, during which the cardinal died. Calderini claimed to have discovered in France the twelve books of Asconius Pedianus' lost Elegatiae, but his claim is considered a fabrication. Afer Bessarion's death, Calderini left Rome for Florence, where he befriended Marsilio Ficino and the young Angelo Poliziano, with whom he would later frequently find himself at odds. In 1476, Calderini accompanied Cardinal Giuliano della Rovere to Avignon. He died two years later in Rome during a plague outbreak.

== Work ==
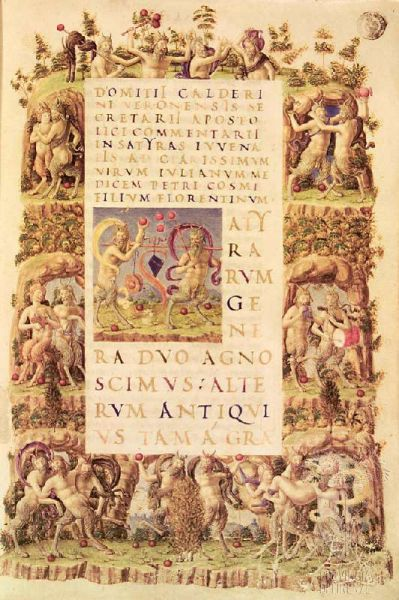
Calderini's commentary on Juvenal. BM Laurentiana, 53.2 f5r

Calderini is best known for his commentaries on the authors of the so-called 'Silver Age' of Latin literature. Although his work was occasionally criticised for its shortcomings, it was the first critical examination of these authors and had a profound influence on subsequent scholarship. In 1473, he published his commentary on Martial's Epigrams, which was first printed the following year. Calderini's work was the first humanistic commentary on a classical author to be printed. It was in direct competition with a commentary by Niccolò Perotti, published around the same time. Perotti, along with Georgius Merula and Poliziano, subjected Calderini's commentary to sharp criticism. Poliziano's critique likely brought an end to the friendship between the two scholars. Calderini engaged in an outright feud with Perotti, criticising several of his interpretations of Pliny the Elder's Naturalis Historia. In his writings, Calderini dubbed Perotti Broteas – the ugly son of Vulcan and Minerva who cast himself into a burning pyre because of his own hideousness. In 1474, Calderini published his commentary on Ovid's Ibis and completed his commentary on Juvenal, which was printed the following year. In the latter, he included a further attack on Perotti titled Defensio adversus Brotheum. Calderini's commentary was heavily criticised by both Perotti and Angelo Sabino. Over the following years, Calderini launched a series of harsh attacks on both Perotti and Sabino in his publications.

In 1475, Calderini published a collection of commentaries covering Statius’ Silvae, Ovid's Heroides 15 (Epistula Sapphus ad Phaonem), and various passages from Propertius. That same year, he published the editio princeps of three Declamationes attributed to Quintilian. Calderini planned to publish three books of Observationes on classical literature, but he was unable to complete the project before his death. His other works include unpublished commentaries on the Appendix Vergiliana, Cicero’s Epistulae ad Atticum and De Officiis, the works of Suetonius and Silius Italicus, and Ovid’s Fasti. Not all of these commentaries were finished by the time of his premature death, and some have been lost. Calderini also devoted himself to Greek literature, revising Jacopo d'Angelo’s translation of Ptolemy’s Geography and beginning a Latin translation of Pausanias' Description of Greece, though he died before completing either. Despite attacks from other humanists, many of Calderini's commentaries remained influential and continued to be used long after his death.

== Bibliography ==
- Perosa, Alessandro (1973). "CALDERINI, Domizio". Dizionario Biografico degli Italiani (in Italian). Vol. 16: Caccianiga–Caluso. Rome: Institute of the Italian Encyclopaedia. ISBN 978-88-12-00032-6.
