= Labiena gens =

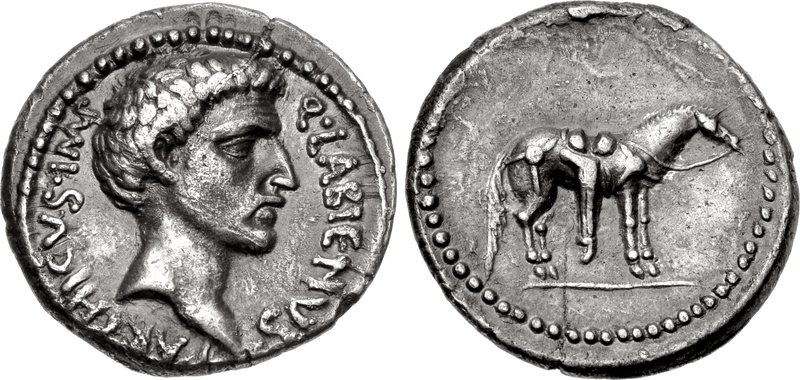
Denarius of Quintus Labienus, minted in Anatolia, 40 BC. Inscription "Q. Labienus Parthicus Imp." The horse on the reverse alludes to Labienus' Parthian cavalry.

The gens Labiena was a plebeian family at Rome. Members of this gens are first mentioned during the final century of the Republic.

== Origin ==
The Labieni were long supposed to have been part of the Atia gens, of which Labienus was supposed to be a cognomen. This first seems to have been proposed by the Ciceronian scholar Paulus Manutius, but his conjecture is not clearly supported by any ancient author, nor is there any other evidence that the Labieni were part of another gens. Notwithstanding the lack of evidence, many other scholars have continued to regard the Labieni as a family of the Atii.

== Members ==
This list includes abbreviated praenomina. For an explanation of this practice, see filiation.

- Quintus Labienus, one of the supporters of the tribune Lucius Appuleius Saturninus, who took refuge in the Capitol when Appuleius was declared a public enemy, and was stoned to death, along with Appuleius and his other supporters after their arrest.
- Titus Labienus, as tribune of the plebs, accused Gaius Rabirius of perduellio at the urging of Caesar, and helped repeal a law of Sulla, clearing the way for Caesar to be elected Pontifex Maximus. He served as Caesar's legate during the Gallic Wars, but was afterward seduced by the Pompeian party, and fought more with malice and cruelty than with ability, until he fell at Munda in 45 BC.
- Quintus Labienus Durus, a military tribune killed during Caesar's second expedition to Britain, is a mistake for Quintus Laberius Durus, whose name Orosius confused with that of Labienus, Caesar's legate. This error was followed by Bede and Geoffrey of Monmouth.
- Quintus Labienus T. f., a supporter of Brutus and Cassius after the murder of Caesar. Following the Battle of Philippi, he obtained the aid of Orodes II of Parthia, and took control of much of Anatolia, before he was defeated and put to flight by Publius Ventidius, the legate of Marcus Antonius. He was apprehended in Cilicia and put to death.
- Titus Labienus, the historian, was probably the son or grandson of Caesar's legate. He was a skilled orator, and an ardent opponent of Augustus, who did little to hinder his activities, although Labienus carefully avoided publishing materials that the emperor might deem libelous. Eventually the Senate decreed that all of his works should be burnt, and rather than suffer this indignity, he shut himself in his family's tombs, and perished.
- Labienus, who had taken part in the proscriptions of Sulla, was proscribed by the triumvirs in 43 BC. Rather than going into hiding, he sat in front of his house, and waited for his assassins.
- Labienus, likewise proscribed, concealed himself from the triumvirs. His freedmen refused to reveal his hiding place, even under torture.

== See also ==
- List of Roman gentes

== Bibliography ==
- Marcus Tullius Cicero, Pro Gaio Rabirio Perduellionis Reo.
- Titus Livius (Livy), Ab Urbe Condita (History of Rome).
- Marcus Velleius Paterculus, Compendium of Roman History.
- Plutarchus, Lives of the Noble Greeks and Romans.
- Florus, Epitome de T. Livio Bellorum Omnium Annorum DCC (Epitome of Livy: All the Wars of Seven Hundred Years).
- Appianus Alexandrinus (Appian), Bellum Civile (The Civil War).
- Marcus Junianus Justinus (Justin), Epitome de Cn. Pompeio Trogo Historiarum Philippicarum et Totius Mundi Originum et Terrae Situs (Epitome of Trogus' Philippic History and Origin of the Whole World and all of its Places).
- Lucius Cassius Dio Cocceianus (Cassius Dio), Roman History.
- Ambrosius Theodosius Macrobius, Saturnalia.
- Ezekiel, Freiherr von Spanheim, Disputationes de Usu et Praestantia Numismatum Antiquorum (Arguments concerning the Knowledge and Superiority of Ancient Coins), Rome, (1664).
- Joseph Hilarius Eckhel, Doctrina Numorum Veterum (The Study of Ancient Coins, 1792–1798).
- Johann Caspar von Orelli, Onomasticon Tullianum, Orell Füssli, Zürich (1826–1838).
- Dictionary of Greek and Roman Biography and Mythology, William Smith, ed., Little, Brown and Company, Boston (1849).
- T. Robert S. Broughton, The Magistrates of the Roman Republic, American Philological Association (1952).
