= Onofrio di Santa Croce =

Neapolitan cardinal and diplomat (died 1471)

Onofrio di Santa Croce (died 20 October 1471) was a cardinal and bishop of Tricarico within the Kingdom of Naples. He was born in Rome and died there. In 1467, he was sent as papal legate by Pope Paul II to mediate between the expanding Duchy of Burgundy and the Prince-Bishopric of Liège in the second Liège war over the desire of the latter for sovereignty. Onofrio had enjoyed previous successes as a diplomat and was armed with firsthand knowledge of the situation acquired when he accompanied the legate Paul Ferri to the city of Liège in 1463.

Despite "tireless efforts," Onofrio failed, and a third Liège war, in October 1468, saw Charles the Bold of Burgundy and Louis XI of France began a siege that would end in the destruction of Liège. Onofrio's memoir is considered "one of the most important 'outside' sources" on the war and events leading up to it. In another attempt to explain the circumstances and consequences of the war, he commissioned the Italian humanist poet Angelo Sabino to compose a historical epic, De excidio civitatis Leodiensis ("The Fall of the City of Liège"). Onofrius died without having regained his good standing at the papal court.

The name Onofrio (Latin Onofrius) will also be found as Onufrio (Onufrius).
