= Carl Darling Buck =

American philologist (1866–1955)

- Born: October 2, 1866; Hancock County, Maine, U.S.
- Died: February 8, 1955 (aged 88); Chicago, Illinois, U.S.
- Spouse: Clarinda Darling Swazey (m. 1889)

Academic work
- Discipline: Philologist

Carl Darling Buck (October 2, 1866 – February 8, 1955) was an American philologist.

== Biography ==
Buck was born on October 2, 1866, in Maine (either in Bucksport or in Orland).

He graduated from Yale in 1886, was a graduate student there for three years, and studied at the American School of Classical Studies in Athens from 1887 to 1889, and in Leipzig from 1889–1892. (Note: Buck's entry in the register of the University of Leipzig reads as follows: "Buck, Carl Darling; 24 Apr 1889; 17 Apr 1891; #301, #420; Orland, ME; 22; Prot Evang; Kaufman/ Fabricant; 1886 AB Yale, 1887-89 American S of Arch Athens Greece, Leipzig; philol. Prof Comp Philol Univ Chicago, 1923-24 Prof 1922-? Member Managing Committee Amer S Class Studies Athens. Wrote William R. Harper on Slavistic Studies at Leipzig in 1891. Eichler, “August Leskiens Wirken für die Slawistik,” 185. Zeil, “Robert Schlovin und sein Beitrag zur Slawistik,” 270. Richter, “100 Jahre deutsche Slawistik, Teil VII,” 541. Lord, 343, 359, 371.)

In 1892 he became professor of Sanskrit and Indo-European comparative philology at the University of Chicago, and was later named Martin A. Ryerson Distinguished Service Professor of Comparative Philology.

In his early career, he concentrated on the Italic dialects, including among his published work, Der Vocalismus der oskischen Sprache (1892), The Oscan-Umbrian Verb-System (1895), and Grammar of Oscan and Umbrian, with a collection of inscriptions and a glossary (1904), and a précis of the Italic languages in Johnson's Universal Cyclopaedia. He collaborated with W.G. Hale in the preparation of A Latin Grammar (1903).

Later, he worked extensively on the Greek dialects, publishing: The Greek dialects; grammar, selected inscriptions, glossary (1910), Comparative grammar of Greek and Latin (1933); and on more general Indo-European issues.

His Dictionary of Selected Synonyms in the Principal Indo-European Languages was called by Calvert Watkins "a treasure house of words, word origins, expressions, and ideas..., a monument to a great American scholar".

Buck was elected to the American Academy of Arts and Sciences in 1921 and the American Philosophical Society in 1923.

Upon his death, The New York Times reported that Buck spoke thirty languages. Many of Buck's books went through multiple editions, and several are still in print.

== Bibliography ==
- Buck, C.D. (1892). Der Vocalismus der oskischen Sprache. Leipzig: K. F. Koehler's Antiquarium.
- Buck, C.D. (1895). The Oscan-Umbrian verb-system. Chicago: University of Chicago Press.
- Buck, C.D. (1903). A sketch of the linguistic conditions of Chicago. Chicago: The University of Chicago Press.
- Buck, C.D. & Hale, W.G. (1903). A Latin grammar. New York: Mentzer, Bush.
- Buck, C.D. (1904). Grammar of Oscan and Umbrian. Boston: Ginn and Company.
- Buck, C.D. (1905). Elementarbuch der oskisch-umbrischen Dialekte. Heidelberg: C. Winter.
- Buck, C.D. (1910). Introduction to the study of the Greek dialects: grammar, selected inscriptions, glossary. Boston: Ginn and Company.
- Buck, C.D. (1933). Comparative grammar of Greek and Latin. Chicago: University of Chicago Press.
- Buck, C.D. & Petersen, W. (1945). A reverse index of Greek nouns and adjectives, arranged by terminations with brief historical introductions. Chicago: University of Chicago Press.
- Buck, C.D. (1949). A dictionary of selected synonyms in the principal Indo–European languages: a contribution to the history of ideas. Chicago: University of Chicago Press.
