= Stemma =

Stemma (plural stemmata) may refer to:

- In stemmatics, an approach to textual criticism, a stemma or stemma codicum is a diagram showing the relationships of the various versions of a text to earlier versions or manuscripts
- Tree-like diagrams representing sentence structure and syntax created by Lucien Tesnière
- Coat of arms or arms in the Italian language
- A family tree or recorded genealogy
- Stemmata refers to a class of simple eyes in arthropods
- Kind of imperial crown in the late Roman, the Byzantine and the Bulgarian empires
- Ensemble of pictures of ancestors hanged in the atrium of a patrician domus in ancient Rome. These pictures ("imagines") where connected among them with painted lines
