= William Gardner Hale =

American classical scholar

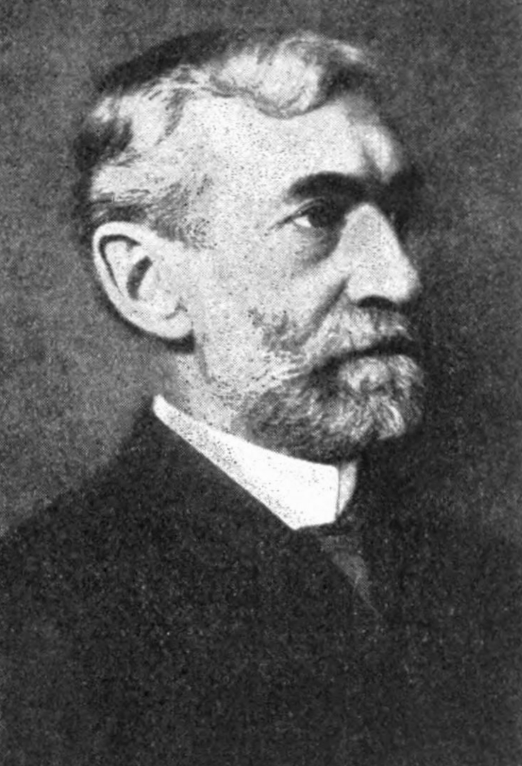
- Born: February 9, 1849; Savannah, Georgia
- Died: June 23, 1928 (aged 79); Stamford, Connecticut
- Education: Phillips Exeter Academy; Harvard University; University of Leipzig; University of Göttingen
- Occupation: Academic
- Spouse: Harriet K Swinburne (m. 1883)
- Children: 4

William Gardner Hale (February 9, 1849 – June 23, 1928) was an American classical scholar.

== Biography ==
William Gardner Hale was born in Savannah, Georgia to a resident New England family. He was a graduate of Phillips Exeter Academy. He graduated at Harvard University in 1870, and took a post-graduate course in philosophy there in 1874–1876; studied classical philology at Leipzig and Göttingen in 1876–1877; was tutor in Latin at Harvard from 1877 to 1880, and succeeding Tracy Peck as professor of Latin in Cornell University from 1880 to 1892, when he became professor of Latin and head of the Latin department of the University of Chicago. From 1894 to 1899 he was chairman and in 1895-1896 first director of the American School of Classical Studies at Rome. Hale held honorary degrees from Princeton, St. Andrew's and Aberdeen Universities.

He is best known as an original teacher on questions of syntax. In The cum-constructions: their history and functions, which appeared in Cornell University studies in classical philology (1888–1889; and in German version by Neizert in 1891), he attacked Hoffmann's distinction between absolute and relative temporal clauses as published in Lateinische Zeitpartikeln (1874); Hoffmann replied in 1891, and the best summary of the controversy is in Wetzel's Der Streit zwischen Hoffmann und Hale (1892). Hale wrote also The sequence of tenses in Latin (1887–1888), The anticipatory subjunctive in Greek and Latin (1894), and a Latin grammar (1903), to which the parts on sounds, inflection and word-formation were contributed by Carl Darling Buck.

After founding the American School of Classical Studies, Rome, 1905–06, Professor Hale served as its director and later, chairman of the board. Returning to Chicago, Hale was Editor, The Classical Quarterly in 1914. He continued his teaching and retired from the university in 1920, spending the next eight years conducting research on a manuscript of Catullus he discovered in Rome in 1896.

He died at his home in Stamford, Connecticut on June 23, 1928.

== Family ==
William Gardner Hale was son to William Hale and Elizabeth Jewett Scott of Peterboro, N.H. Professor Hale married Harriet K Swinburne (1853–1928) of Newport, Rhode Island, an 1873 graduate of Vassar College, on June 13, 1883. The couple had four children, including fresco painter and interior decorator Gardner Hale (1900–1931) of New York City, and Swinburne Hale (1884–1937), a prominent civil rights attorney and political activist of the 1920s. One daughter, Mrs. Vancil Foster, resided at Taos, New Mexico and another daughter, Miss Virginia Hall, resided in New York City.

== Multilateralist ==
When the German Empire invaded Belgium in 1914, Professor Hale was abroad in Europe. He cabled the New York Times from Le Havre, France, and permitted his name to be published with his cable recommending the United States declare war on Germany. Six months into the First World War, the Wilson Administration had succeeded in keeping the United States neutral. Professor Hale called for war in September 1914; in January 1915 he was in partial agreement with former President Theodore Roosevelt on the need to act against the German Empire. But like fellow progressive Alfred Hayes, Jr., William Gardner Hale viewed the American role as supporting the internationalist and multilateral position represented by the Hague Conventions. Roosevelt was defining the unilateralist tenet that would become a hallmark of 20th century Republican Party foreign policy doctrine.

In May 1916, Hale agreed to serve as an honorary vice president of the American Rights Committee during its Carnegie Hall memorial protest of the Lusitania sinking by a German Navy U-Boat. The purpose of the mass meeting was to organize a petition to President Woodrow Wilson demanding an end of diplomatic relations with the Imperial Court at Berlin. New York City Mayor John Purroy Mitchel succeeded in postponing the protest, in part to ameliorate worsening relations in the city between the pro-Allied and pro-German factions.

In the 1916 Presidential election, William Gardner Hale endorsed Woodrow Wilson over Charles Evans Hughes. Hale's position was based on his concern that Hughes would draw the United States into another war with the Republic of Mexico and that Wilson, while not supportive enough of the Allies in Europe, "had the high aim of building up a national life in which, while honest business shall have every opportunity, privilege shall not rule the poor and the weak. He has made of his party a truly progressive party." Hale was a member of the New England Anti-Imperialist League, as well as the Phi Beta Kappa Society, the German Archaeological Institute of Berlin, Athens and Rome, and the American Philological Association (APA). He was President of the APA from 1892 to 1893.

== Works ==
- Latin Composition. (1912).
- A Latin Grammar. (1903).
- The Art of Reading Latin: How to Teach It. (1902).
- The Cum-Constructions: Their History and Functions. (No. 1, Cornell Studies in Classical Philology)(Hale & Wheeler, eds.) (1889).
