= Cassius Severus =

Roman orator and teacher of rhetoric (died AD 32)

Titus Cassius Severus (died in AD 32) was an ancient Roman rhetor from the gens Cassia. He was active during the reigns of Augustus and Tiberius. Cassius Severus, a fearless fighter for freedom of speech, was sharply eloquent against the new governmental order, which finally saw him exiled and his works banned after his death.

== Life ==
Cassius Severus was said to have risen from a simple background. He was a legendary success as a teacher of rhetoric. He was considered to be very well read. His negative qualities were also apparent. He was sometimes uncontrollably aggressive and cynical in his speeches and also reacted badly to insults.

Oratory played a vital role in the social and political life of Rome; rhetoric thus was a vital aspect when Severus was living. The transition from the republican to imperial rule in Rome also brought about changes in the way oratory was conducted.

Ciceronian oratory was becoming impossible under the increasing Monarchical rule of Augustus. This necessitated the need to employ a different kind of oratory in the post-Ciceronian world. Cassius Severus was one of those who deviated from the ancient manner decisively and brought in the new style. It was Severus's conscious intention to step into the new era, adapting oratory to the requirement of the new age of imperialism.

The manner and style of oratory became more violent and aggressive than previously practiced under the Republic. Steven H. Rutledge in his essay, "Delatores and the Tradition of Violence in Roman Oratory," provides a different point of view. He points out the violence in both the republican accusers and delatores speech under the Empire. On the other hand, Marcus Aper and Vipstanus Messalla had different opinions regarding oratory and its contemporary state in ancient Rome. But in the Dialogus de oratoribus of Tacitus, these two men are unanimous at one point in stating that Cassius Severus has had no contribution on the change in oratory from the days of Cicero. In the words of Messalla:

If (Cassius) were compared to those who were later, he can be called an orator, although the greater part of these books contain more bile than blood. For he was the first who, having despised good composition, with no sense of modesty or shame in his diction, and even disorderly and generally thrown off his feet by the very weapons he used due to his eagerness to strike, did not fight but bickered.

He is still known today by the surviving analyses of his speeches by Quintilian, Seneca and Tacitus. All three authors are ambivalent towards him, regarding him to be talented and witty (Quintilian calls him compulsory reading) but at times as too passionate and thus often inordinate and ridiculous. Tacitus uses him as an example to explain the "boundary" between the rhetoric of the Republic and the Principate, and in his Annals he called him:

A man of mean origin and a life of crime, but a powerful pleader, [who brought his exile] on himself, by his persistent quarrelsomeness.

Tacitus raises another issue in oratory-a need for sensitive balance between sharp wit and its abuse in which Cassius Severus was at fault. It can be well comprehended from the quote taken from Paul Plass' Wit and Writing of History: The Rhetoric of Historiography in Imperial Rome. The quote given below indicates the problem of abusive political rhetoric for which Severus is faulted by Tacitus and others can be gauged.

I [Cassius himself] remember that I entered his [Cestius'] lecture room just as he was about to speak against Milo, with his usual vanity he was saying, "If I were a gladiator, I would be [the great] Fusius; if I were a pantomime, I would be [the great] Bathyllus, if I were a horse, I would be [the great] Melissio." I couldn't restrain my anger and shouted,"if you were a sewer [cloaca], you would be the greatest [cloaca Maxiama]!" The students looked at me and wondered who the boor was. Cestius, who had intended to answer Cicero, could not think of an answer to me and refused to go on unless I left. I wouldn't go from the public bath before I had washed. Then I decided to avenge Cicero on Cestius; in the forum I summoned him to court before the praetor, and when I had satisfied myself with jokes and insults, I demanded that he be indicted. (Seneca, Controv. 3, pref. 16-17)

Augustus took various steps to stop the flourishing of anti-monarchic sentiments. He stopped the publication of senatorial protocols, poisonous pamphlets; curtailed all oral and written criticism, started book burning in the name of ecclesiastical requirement, made new laws on censorship and so on. Titus Labienus was the first victim on the charge of committing literary treason under lex maiestas. In this case the specific offensive work was destroyed. But in the case of Titus Labienus, all his writings were destined to be destroyed.

Tacitus also refers to the law. Augustus made an edict against lampoons, satires and the authors of defamatory writings. To denote it Tacitus refers to the law term - famosos libellos in the first book of his Annals:

Augustus was the first who under the colour of that law took cognizance of lampoons, being provoked to it by the petulancy of Cassius Severus, who had defamed many illustrious persons of both sexes, in his writings."

This intermittent law was first restored by Augustus for his personal safety and the security of the new regime.

Cassius Severus, a colleague of Titus Labienus, stood for the cause of Labienus and his writings though he was extremely disliked by Labienus. Cassius Severus exclaimed, "If they really want to destroy the works of Labienus, they must burn me alive. For I have learned them by heart!"

He also pronounced prophetically, "Of humble birth, Titus Cassius Severus worked his way up."

He was a sarcastic lawyer. He used to handle cases on civil law as well as on criminal law. He used to handle two cases in the morning and one in the afternoon. Having strong argumentative oratory skill, he did not win always. As a defence lawyer, he only took on cases he felt he would enjoy.

He prosecuted Augustus' friend Lucius Nonius Asprenas for poisoning. He was once saved from a lawsuit de moribus by Augustus. Yet, he dwelled upon republican convictions. After his wife Amelia betrayed him for Sejanus, Drusus Julius Caesar was dismissed by Tiberius. It wasn't long before he was accused by Cassius Severus of plotting against Tiberius. He was imprisoned and confined to a dungeon on the Palatine in 30. He starved to death in prison in 33 after having been reduced to chewing the stuffing of his bed.

He established a valid point regarding the declamations-the pale classroom recitations and the Forum Romanum-Rome's traditional rough and ready school for lawyers and magistrates.

He had commented:

"The school is a mere training ground, the Forum real arena...what good can there possibly be in a classroom imitation of a trial."

Cassius Severus attacked Rome's social elite of both sexes which roused the emperor's wrath.

His support for Labienus meant that it was only a matter of time before Cassius Severus was brought to account and his books too were to be reduced to ashes. The Roman Senate by a formal senatus consultum added the penalty of exile to him on the island of Crete but his property remained unconfiscated. Cassius Severus was however unrepentant and did not ask for mercy. His murderous pen continued to write abuse of the regime. Augustus did not take further cognizance of his victim. After Augustus' death, the case came up again before the senate. The second trial ended with the interdict from fire and water in 24 AD. The decision was to make stubborn, rebellious Severus' life a living death. He was transferred from Crete, his former place of exile to the barren little island of Seriphos. Death emancipated him from his rebellious thirst for freedom. He is said to have died in 32 AD enduring the twenty-fifth year of exile. His writings were banned after his death, only to be republished under Caligula, but his court speeches only survive today in fragments.

== Sources ==
- Alston, Richard (1998), Aspects of Roman History AD 14–117, Routledge, ISBN 0-415-13236-3
- Steven H. Rutledge: Imperial inquisitions. Prosecutors and informants from Tiberius to Domitian. Routledge, London 2001, ISBN 0-415-23700-9, S. 209–212.
- Notes on Letter 28 of Pliny the Elder
- A Companion to Roman Rhetoric, edited by William Dominik, Jon C.R Hall
- Paul Plass’ Wit and the Writing of History : the Rhetoric of Historiography in Imperial Rome
- Roland Syme, The Roman Revolution
- Frederick Cramer, “Bookburning and Censorship in Ancient Rome”, The History of Freedom of Speech
