= Titus Labienus (historian) =

Roman orator and historian

- Born: unknown
- Died: c. A.D. 8
- Occupations: orator and historian
- Years active: 1st century B.C.- 1st century A.D.
- Known for: being the first writer tried for literary treason

Titus Labienus was an orator and historian during the reign of Augustus. He wrote works of oratory and history. After the Roman Senate ordered his books burned, Labienus committed suicide. Caligula later lifted the ban on his books.

== Life ==
Almost nothing is known of his early life. He was of the Labiena gens and grew up poor.

During his lifetime, Augustus had become the first Roman emperor. Titus Labienus opposed Augustus, however, and even supported the defunct Pompeian cause.

Titus Labienus, in his historical works, criticized Rome's class structure, which led to his insulting epithet, Rabienus ("Mad Dog"). His writings contained anti-imperial material, thus, when he recited his works in public, he would have to omit certain sections. Instead, he said that these unread sections should be read after his death. Despite all of this, Titus Labienus was recognized as a great orator.

During his waning years, Roman Emperor Augustus, who did not push censorship during most of his reign, began to put strict regulations on writing and began to censor writings. These new regulations upset Titus Labienus, as he wanted to write and teach without government restrictions.

During the last decade of his rule, Augustus created laws with punishments for those voicing a dissenting opinion against the state in writing. Depending on how guilty one was or how serious the crime was, either one or all of one's life works were to be burned.

It was teachers like Titus Labienus who were affected by this censorship, which led to his trial from A.D. 6 to 8, the first of its kind, where the Roman Senate found him guilty of literary treason.

== Death ==
Upon hearing that he was guilty of literary treason and that his library was to be burnt, Titus Labienus decided to kill himself. He went to the ancestors' mausoleum, walled himself up, and committed suicide. He refused cremation of his body.

== Legacy ==
With his death, attention was brought to imperial censorship.

Some 30 years later, Caligula began rolling back some of this censorship, yet simultaneously, he still pushed this censorship. He permitted the works of Titus Labienus, along with several others, like Cassius Severus, to be read, saying that it was best to have all events recorded.

Near the end of the century, his works were listed as standard teaching material by the educator and rhetorician Quintilian.

== See also ==
- Labiena (gens)

== Bibliography ==
- Barrett, Anthony A., Caligula The Corruption of Power. New Haven, CT: Yale UP, 1990. 66–67.
- Cramer, Frederick H. "Book Burning and Censorship in Ancient Rome: A Chapter from the History of Freedom of Speech". JSTOR. Lucas Family Library, Atherton. 29 November 2008 .
- Fantham, Elaine, Roman Literary Culture : From Cicero to Apuleius. New York: Johns Hopkins UP, 1999. 124–24. Google. 29 Nov. 2008 - available on Google Books
- Hornblower, Simon, and Spawforth, Anthony. "Labienus, Titus." Def. 2. The Oxford Classical Dictionary. New York: Oxford University Press, 1996.
- Rahyab, Susan. MA Thesis: Censorship and Book-Burning in Imperial Rome and Egypt CUNY Academic Works (CUNY Libraries), 2020.
