= Libel (poetry) =

Verse genre of the Renaissance

Libel is a verse genre primarily of the Renaissance, descended from the tradition of invective in classical Greek and Roman poetry. Libel is usually expressly political, and bolder and coarser than satire. Libels were generally not published but circulated among friends and political partisans in manuscript.

== Classical roots ==
In ancient Greece, invective verse generally existed in the form of epigrams written, almost always anonymously, against public figures. In Latin, the genre grew in prestige and boldness, as major authors including Juvenal and Catullus wrote extended invectives without the cushion of anonymity. One of Catullus's fiercer examples, expunged from most post-classical collections of his work until the 20th century, is Catullus 16, written against two critics:

Pedicabo ego vos et irrumabo,
Aureli pathice et cinaede Furi
qui me ex versiculis meis putastis,
quod sunt molliculi, parum podicum ...

Translation:

I'll sodomize and face-fuck you,
Pussy Aurelius, and Furius the sodomite
Who conclude, based on my verse,
Which is voluptuous, that I have gone soft ...

Cicero's In Pisonem, a hyperbolic attack on Lucius Calpurnius Piso Caesoninus, is one of the best-known political examples.

== See also ==
- Monarchomachs
