= Sabinus (Ovid) =

Poet and friend of Ovid (died 14 or 15 AD)

Sabinus (died 14 or 15 AD) was a Latin poet and friend of Ovid. He is known only from two passages of Ovid's works.

At Amores 2.18.27—34, Ovid says that Sabinus has written responses to six of Ovid's Heroïdes, the collection of elegiac epistles each written in the person of a legendary woman to her absent male lover. These are enumerated as Ulysses to Penelope, in response to Heroïdes 1; Hippolytus to Phaedra (H. 4); Aeneas to Dido (H. 7); Demophoon to Phyllis (H. 2); Jason to Hypsipyle (H. 6); and (presumably) Phaon to Sappho (H. 15).

Three of these Ovidian responses by Sabinus — the letters from Ulysses and Demophoon, along with a letter from Paris to Oenone (Heroïdes 5) — are printed in Renaissance editions of the Heroïdes. Modern scholars believe them to have actually been written in the 1460s–1470s by the humanist Angelo Sabino, who was a poet and editor of classical texts. His edition advertised the inclusion of poems by "Aulus Sabinus," and though this has sometimes been taken as the ancient poet's praenomen, it was probably part of Sabino's invention.

Sabinus is also among some thirty contemporary poets mentioned by Ovid in his verse letters from exile (collected as the Tristia and Epistulae ex Ponto). Ovid's bitter last letter ex Ponto, written in 15 AD, alludes to Sabinus's response from Ulysses and gives titles for two other works by him, Troezen and Dierum Opus, the latter of which is said to have been left unfinished upon his recent and untimely death.

The 19th-century scholar Carl Gläser conjectured that the Troezen was an epic poem containing a history of the birth and adventures of Theseus, whose birthplace was Troezen, up to the time of his arrival at his father's court at Athens. The Dierum Opus ("Days' Work") he regarded as a continuation of Ovid's calendrical Fasti, which was left unfinished when he died in exile. Since Sabinus died before Ovid, this may be problematic.
