= Marcus Furius Bibaculus =

Roman poet

Marcus Furius Bibaculus (1st century BC) was a Roman neoteric poet who flourished during the last century of the Republic.

== Life ==
According to Jerome, he was born at Cremona, in 103 BC; however, scholars believe that this date is much too early and that he seems to be a contemporary of Catullus. Like Catullus, he wrote satirical poems in the same style. It is conjectured that he is the friend whom Catullus jokingly satirises in poems 16, 23, and 26.

He wrote satirical poems after the manner of Catullus, whose bitterness he rivaled, according to Quintilian (Instit. x.i.196), in his iambics. He even attacked Augustus (and perhaps Caesar), who treated the matter with indifference. He was also author of prose Lucubrationes and perhaps of an epic poem on Caesar's Gallic Wars (Pragmatia Belli Gallici).

Otto Ribbeck attributes to him one of the shorter poems usually assigned to Virgil. It is doubtful whether he is the person ridiculed by Horace (Satires, ii.5.40) and whether he is identical with the turgidus Alpinus (Satires, i.10.36), the author of an Aethiopis dealing with the life and death of Memnon and of a poem on the Rhine. Some critics, on the ground that Horace would not have ventured to attack so dangerous an adversary, assume the existence of a poet whose real name was Furius (or Cornelius) Alpinus.

Bibaculus was ridiculed for his high-flown and exaggerated style and manner of expression. Fragments of his work can be found in L. Müller's edition of Catullus's work in the Teubner Series (1870).

== See also ==
- Roman poetry

== Citations ==
- This work in turn cites:
  - Weichert, “De M. Furio Bibaculo,” in his Poetarum Latinorum Reliquiae (1830)
