= Codex Vaticanus Ottobonianus Latinus 1829 =

Codex Vaticanus Ottobonianus Latinus 1829 is one of the three most important manuscripts preserving the poems of Catullus. Among students of the matter it is commonly known as Codex Romanus (or "R").

== Description ==
It is a Latin manuscript, written in Gothic minuscule script on parchment, dated to around 1390. It consists of 40 leaves (80 pages), 37 of them containing the poems of Catullus. It is the youngest of the three most important manuscripts of Catullus, the other two being: codex Oxoniensis (O) preserved in the Bodleian Library in Oxford and codex Sangermanensis (G) in the Bibliothèque nationale de France in Paris. Considering the stemma codicum, the Vatican codex is of the same rank as the latter one (the Oxford manuscript being one step closer to the lost archetype, known as codex Veronensis or "V").

== History ==
The first owner of the manuscript was an Italian humanist, Coluccio Salutati. In the mid-16th century Achilles Statius, in his edition of Catullan poems, shows an acquaintance with this codex. Later the codex was lost: it was probably housed in the Vatican Library for a very long time, hidden under a false catalogue number, until it was rediscovered in 1896 by William Gardner Hale. Hale promised to collate the codex, but failed to do so before his death in 1928 – this in turn delayed the now general acceptance of R as one of the first rank Catullian codices. The codex was collated by a Canadian scholar, D. F. S. Thomson, in 1970.

== See also ==
- Textual criticism
