= Niccolò Perotti =

Italian humanist

Perotti in the Rijksmuseum Amsterdam Liber Chronicarum of 1493

Niccolò Perotti, also Perotto or Nicolaus Perottus (1429 – 14 December 1480), was an Italian humanist and the author of one of the first modern Latin school grammars.

== Biography ==
Born in Sassoferrato (near Fano), Marche, Perotti studied with Vittorino da Feltre in Mantua in 1443, then in Ferrara with Guarino. He also studied at the University of Padua. At the age of eighteen he spent some time in the household of the Englishman William Grey, later Lord High Treasurer, who was travelling in Italy and was a student of Guarino. He transcribed texts for Grey and accompanied him to Rome when he moved there. He was a secretary of Cardinal Basilius Bessarion in 1447, and wrote a biography of him in 1472.

From 1451 to 1453 he taught rhetoric and poetry at the University of Bologna. In 1452 he was made Poet Laureate in Bologna by the Emperor Frederick III, as acknowledgment of the speech of welcome he had composed. In 1455 he became secretary to Pope Callixtus III. In 1456 he was ordained, and from 1458 he was Archbishop of Siponto (thus he is sometimes called Sipontino or Sipontinus). Occasionally he officiated also as papal governor in Viterbo (1464–69), Spoleto (1471–2) and Perugia (1474–77). He also travelled on diplomatic missions to Naples and Germany. On behalf of Pope Nicholas V he translated Polybius' Roman History, for which the Pope paid him five hundred ducats.

He wrote a Latin school grammar, Rudimenta Grammatices (printed by Pannartz and Sweynheim in 1473), one of the earliest and most popular Renaissance Latin grammars, which attempted to exclude many words and constructions of medieval, rather than classical, origin. Described by Erasmus as 'accurate, yet not pedantic', it became a bestseller of its day, going through 117 printings and selling 59,000 copies in Italy, Spain, Germany, France and the Low Countries by the end of the century; a further 12,000 copies of Bernardus Perger's adaptation of the work, Grammatica Nova, were also sold. With Pomponio Leto, he produced a version of the poet Martial's Epigrammaton in the 1470s. A book on Martial, Cornu Copiae – part commentary, part dictionary – which was completed by Perotti in 1478 and printed after his death, in 1489, was another bestseller. One commentator calls it "a massive encyclopedia of the classical world. Every verse, indeed every word of Martial's text was a hook on which Perotti hung a densely woven tissue of linguistic, historical and cultural knowledge". It was dedicated to the condottiere Federico III da Montefeltro.

He was also something of a controversialist and openly criticised Domizio Calderini for his work on Martial. He was involved in Lorenzo Valla's dispute with the writer Poggio Bracciolini, and in 1453 he sent an assassin to murder Poggio, then Chancellor of Florence. When the attempt failed and the Florentine government protested, he was forced by Bessarion, his employer, to write an apology to Poggio.

Perotti was so incensed by the number of errors in Giovanni Andrea Bussi's printed edition of Pliny's Natural History that he wrote to the Pope asking him to set up a board of learned correctors (such as himself) who would scrutinise every text before it could be printed. This has been described as the first call for censorship of the press. He himself was later accused by another scholar of introducing 275 serious errors in the text when he produced his own version of the work.

A collection of fables by Phaedrus, not known from any other source, was discovered by Perotti in a manuscript which is now lost. Perotti's version has been preserved in the Vatican Library and is known as "Perotti's Appendix".

Together with the Florentine bookseller Vespasiano da Bisticci, he collected books for the Papal library. He died in Sassoferrato on 14 December 1480.
