= Invective =

Insulting language used to express blame or censure

Invective (from Middle English invectif, or Old French and Late Latin invectus) is abusive, or insulting language used to express blame or censure; or, a form of rude expression or discourse intended to offend or hurt; vituperation, or deeply seated ill will, vitriol. The Latin adjective invectivus means 'scolding.' Invective language is primarily used in speeches, debates and social media posts to denounce or attack someone else.

== The genre of invective ==
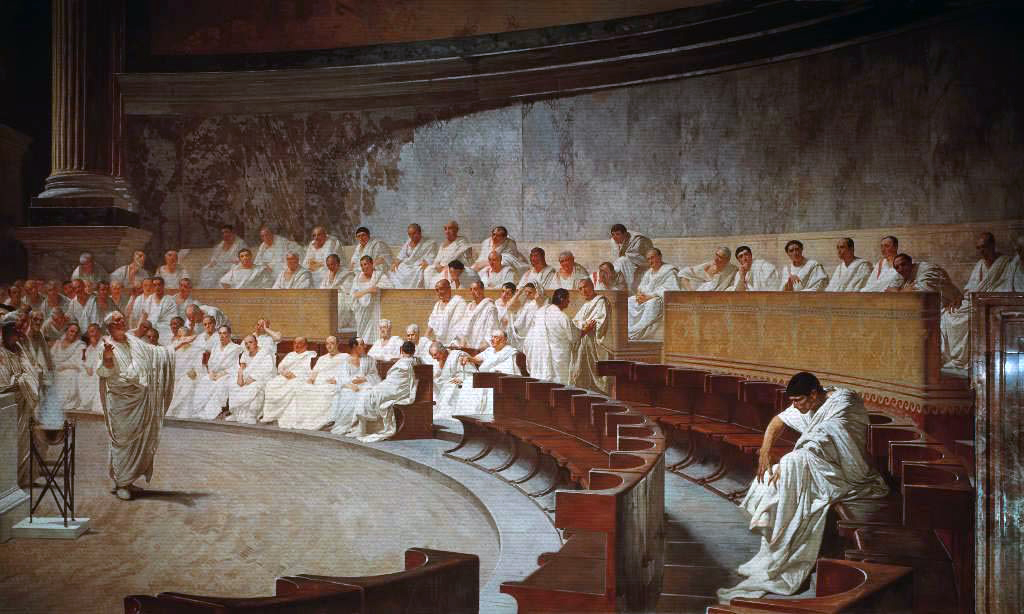
Cicero denounces Catilina; fresco by Cesare Maccari, 1882–1888

The "genre of invective" or "vituperatio" in Latin is a classical literary form used in Greek and Roman polemical verse as well as in prose. Its primary context is as rhetoric.

The genre of vituperatio belongs to the genus demonstrativum, which is composed of the elements of praise and blame.

During the Roman Republic, personal invectives and character assassination were widely used as part of both forensic speeches and orations. Cicero made frequent use of the invective form against political foes such as Clodius, Catilina (in the Catalinarian speeches) or Mark Antony (Philippics). Common charges included avarice, cupidity, cowardice, effeminacy, drunkenness, poor writing and speaking skills, luxury, disapproved sexual habits and tyrannical behaviour.

Between 44 BC and 30 BC, invective became a tool of the propaganda war between Octavian and Mark Antony. Among other slanders, Mark Antony was accused of having married the foreign queen Cleopatra, of being her submissive subject and of having lost his Roman identity. Further, it was stated that Cleopatra was planning to invade Italy. This propaganda before the Battle of Actium in 31 BC allowed Octavian to present his campaign as a legitimate military campaign to defend the Roman Republic.

The preferred literary term for the later invective of the Renaissance is libel.

== See also ==
- Libel (poetry)
- Diss (music)
