= Writings of Cicero =

Marcus Tullius Cicero
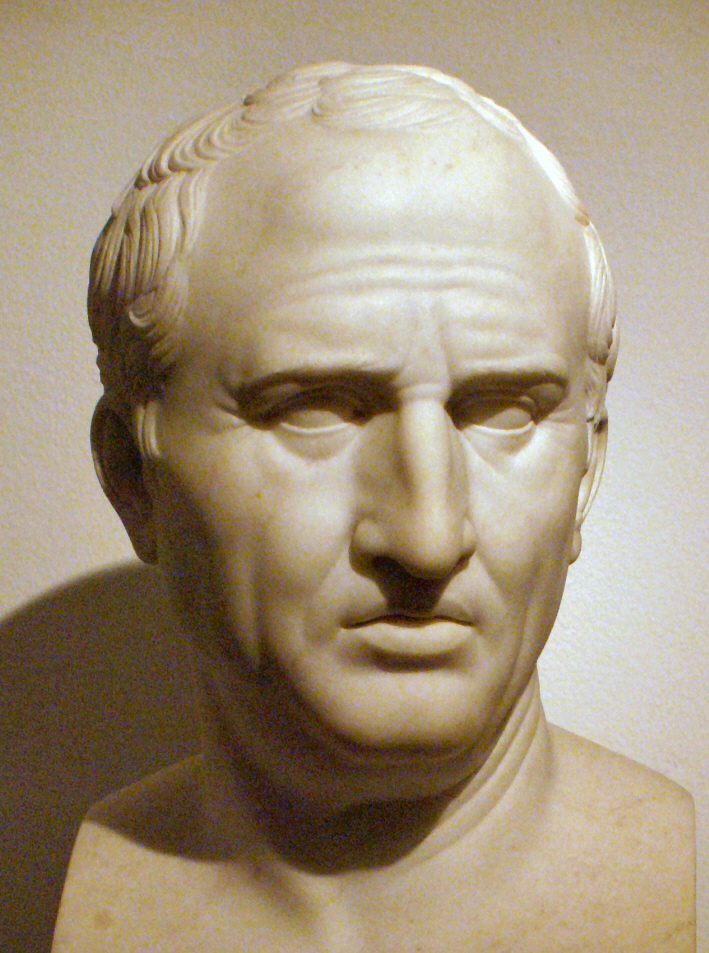
- Born: January 3, 106 BC; Arpinum, Italy
- Died: December 7, 43 BC; Formia, Italy
- Occupations: Politician, lawyer, orator and philosopher
- Writing career
- Subjects: politics, law, philosophy, oratory
- Notable works: Orations: In Verrem, In Catilinam I–IV, Philippicae; Philosophy: De Oratore, De Re Publica, De Legibus, De Finibus, De Natura Deorum, De Officiis
- Movement: Golden Age Latin

The writings of Marcus Tullius Cicero constitute one of the most renowned collections of historical and philosophical work in all of classical antiquity. Cicero was a Roman politician, lawyer, orator, political theorist, philosopher, and constitutionalist who lived during the years of 106–43 BC. He held the positions of Roman senator and Roman consul (chief-magistrate) and played a critical role in the transformation of the Roman Republic into the Roman Empire. He was extant during the rule of prominent Roman politicians, such as those of Julius Caesar, Pompey, and Marc Antony. Cicero is widely considered one of Rome's greatest orators and prose stylists.

Cicero is generally held to be one of the most versatile minds of ancient Rome. He introduced the Romans to the chief schools of Greek philosophy, and also created a Latin philosophical vocabulary; distinguishing himself as a linguist, translator, and philosopher. A distinguished orator and successful lawyer, Cicero likely valued his political career as his most important achievement. Today he is appreciated primarily for his humanism and philosophical and political writings. His voluminous correspondence, much of it addressed to his friend Atticus, has been especially influential, introducing the art of refined letter writing to European culture. Cornelius Nepos, the 1st-century BC biographer of Atticus, remarked that Cicero's letters to Atticus contained such a wealth of detail "concerning the inclinations of leading men, the faults of the generals, and the revolutions in the government" that their reader had little need for a history of the period.

During the chaotic latter half of the first century BC, marked by civil wars and the controversial rule of Gaius Julius Caesar, Cicero championed a return to the traditional republican government. However, his career as a statesman was marked by inconsistencies and a tendency to shift his position in response to changes in the political climate. His indecision may be attributed to his sensitive and impressionable personality; he was prone to overreaction in the face of political and private change. "Would that he had been able to endure prosperity with greater self-control and adversity with more fortitude!" wrote C. Asinius Pollio, a contemporary Roman statesman and historian.

== Transmission ==
Cicero was declared a "virtuous pagan" by the early Church, and therefore many of his works were deemed worthy of preservation. Important Church Fathers such as Saint Augustine and others quoted liberally from his works, e.g. "On the Commonwealth" (De Re Publica) and "On Laws" (De Legibus), as well as Cicero's (partial) Latin translation of Plato's Timaeus dialogue. Cicero also articulated an early, abstract conceptualisation of rights, based on ancient law and custom.

Cicero's writings were widely available in the Middle Ages. Particularly of note is Paris MS 7530, written between 779 and 796 AD at the abbey of Monte Cassino, which contains some fifty-eight writings on grammar, rhetoric, dialectic, and related topics. From the 1000s onward there was a healthy commentary on many of Cicero's works including his juvenilia.

A manuscript containing Cicero's letters to Atticus, Quintus, and Brutus was discovered by Petrarch in 1345 at the Chapter Library of Verona. In Whig history, this rediscovery is mythologically credited for initiating the 14th-century Italian Renaissance, and for the founding of Renaissance humanism. Since the 1970s, historians beginning with Colin Morris and Caroline Walker Bynum have argued against the view of Petrarch as pioneering individualism, arguing that the differences in his approach to Cicero and other classic authors are more subtle.

== Works ==
=== Speeches ===
Of his speeches, eighty-eight were recorded, fifty-two of which survive today. Some of the items below include more than one speech.

==== Legal speeches ====
- (81 BC) Pro Quinctio (On behalf of Publius Quinctius)
- (80 BC) Pro Roscio Amerino (In Defense of Sextus Roscius of Ameria)
- (77 BC) Pro Q. Roscio Comoedo (In Defense of Quintus Roscius Gallus the Comic actor)
- (71 BC) Pro Tullio (On behalf of Tullius)
- (70 BC) Divinatio in Caecilium (Against Quintus Caecilius in the process for selecting a prosecutor of Gaius Verres)
- (70 BC) In Verrem (Against Gaius Verres, or The Verrines)
- (69 BC) Pro Fonteio (In Defense of Marcus Fonteius)
- (69 BC) Pro Caecina (On behalf of Caecina)
- (66 BC) Pro Cluentio (In Defense of Aulus Cluentius)
- (63 BC) Pro Rabirio Perduellionis Reo (In Defense of Gaius Rabirius on a Charge of Treason)
- (63 BC) Pro Murena (In Defense of Lucius Licinius Murena, in the court for electoral bribery)
- (62 BC) Pro Sulla (In Defense of Publius Cornelius Sulla)
- (62 BC) Pro Archia Poeta (In Defense of Aulus Licinius Archias the poet)
- (59 BC) Pro Antonio (In Defense of Gaius Antonius) [lost entire, or never written]
- (59 BC) Pro Flacco (In Defense of Lucius Valerius Flaccus, in the court for extortion)
- (56 BC) Pro Sestio (In Defense of Publius Sestius)
- (56 BC) In Vatinium testem (Against the witness Publius Vatinius at the trial of Sestius)
- (56 BC) Pro Caelio (In Defense of Marcus Caelius Rufus): English translation
- (56 BC) Pro Balbo (In Defense of Lucius Cornelius Balbus)
- (54 BC) Pro Plancio (In Defense of Gnaeus Plancius)
- (54 BC) Pro Rabirio Postumo (In Defense of Gaius Rabirius Postumus)
- (54 BC) Pro Scauro (In Defense of Marcus Aemilius Scaurus)

Several of Cicero's speeches are printed, in English translation, in the Penguin Classics edition Murder Trials. These speeches are included:

- In defence of Sextus Roscius of Ameria (This is the basis for Steven Saylor's novel Roman Blood.)
- In defence of Aulus Cluentius Habitus
- In defence of Gaius Rabirius
- Note on the speeches in defence of Caelius and Milo
- In defence of King Deiotarus

==== Political speeches ====
Early career (before exile)

- (66 BC) Pro Lege Manilia or De Imperio Cn. Pompei (in favor of the Lex Manilia, or on the command of Pompey)
- (64 BC) In Toga Candida (Denouncing candidates for the consulship of 63 BC)
- (63 BC) De Lege Agraria contra Rullum (Opposing the Agrarian Law proposed by Rullus)
- (63 BC) In Catilinam I–IV (Catiline Orations or Against Catiline)
- (59 BC) Pro Flacco (In Defense of Flaccus)

Mid career (between exile and Caesarian Civil War)

- (57 BC) Post Reditum in Quirites (To the Citizens after his recall from exile)
- (57 BC) Post Reditum in Senatu (To the Senate after his recall from exile)
- (57 BC) De Domo Sua (On his House)
- (57 BC) De Haruspicum Responsis (On the Responses of the Haruspices)
- (56 BC) De Provinciis Consularibus (On the Consular Provinces)
- (55 BC) In Pisonem (Against Piso)
- (52 BC) Pro Milone (In Defence of Titus Annius Milo)

Late career

- (46 BC) Pro Marcello (On behalf of Marcellus)
- (46 BC) Pro Ligario (On behalf of Ligarius before Caesar)
- (46 BC) Pro Rege Deiotaro (On behalf of King Deiotarus before Caesar)
- (44 BC) Philippicae (consisting of the 14 philippics, Philippica I–XIV, against Marcus Antonius)

(The Pro Marcello, Pro Ligario, and Pro Rege Deiotaro are collectively known as "The Caesarian speeches").

=== Rhetoric and politics ===
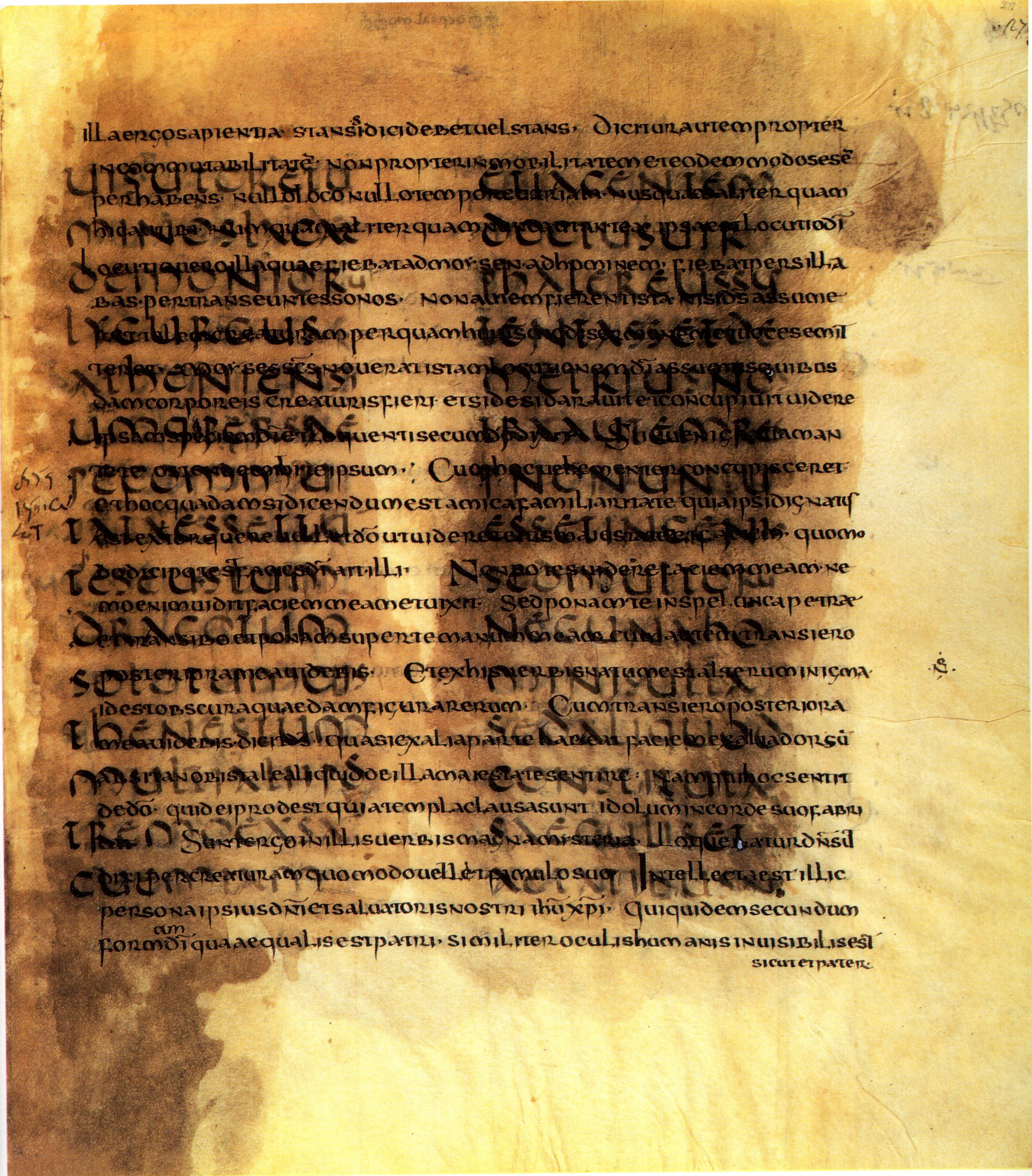
4th/5th century manuscript of De Re Publica (palimpsest)

- (84 BC) De Inventione (About the composition of arguments)
- (55 BC) De Oratore ad Quintum fratrem libri tres (On the Orator, three books for his brother Quintus)
- (54 BC) De Partitionibus Oratoriae (About the subdivisions of oratory)
- (52 BC) De Optimo Genere Oratorum (About the Best Kind of Orators)
- (51 BC) De Re Publica (On the Republic, also known as "On the Commonwealth", and referred to as such, above)
- (46 BC) Brutus (For Brutus, a short history of Roman rhetoric and orators dedicated to Marcus Junius Brutus)
- (46 BC) Orator ad M. Brutum (The Orator, addressed to Brutus)
- (44 BC) Topica (Topics)
- (?? BC) De Legibus (On the Laws)
- (?? BC) De Consulatu Suo (On his consulship – epic poem about Cicero's own consulship, fragmentary)
- (?? BC) De temporibus suis (His Life and Times) – epic poem, entirely lost

=== Philosophy ===
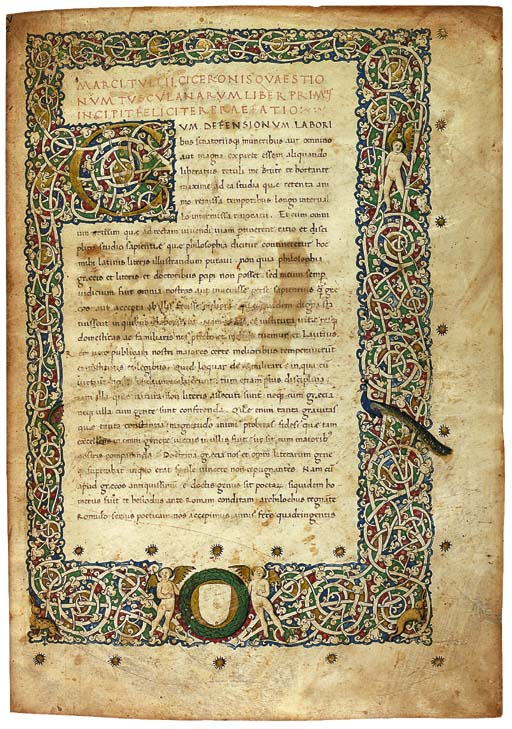
Illuminated manuscript of the Tusculanae Disputationes (1450s)

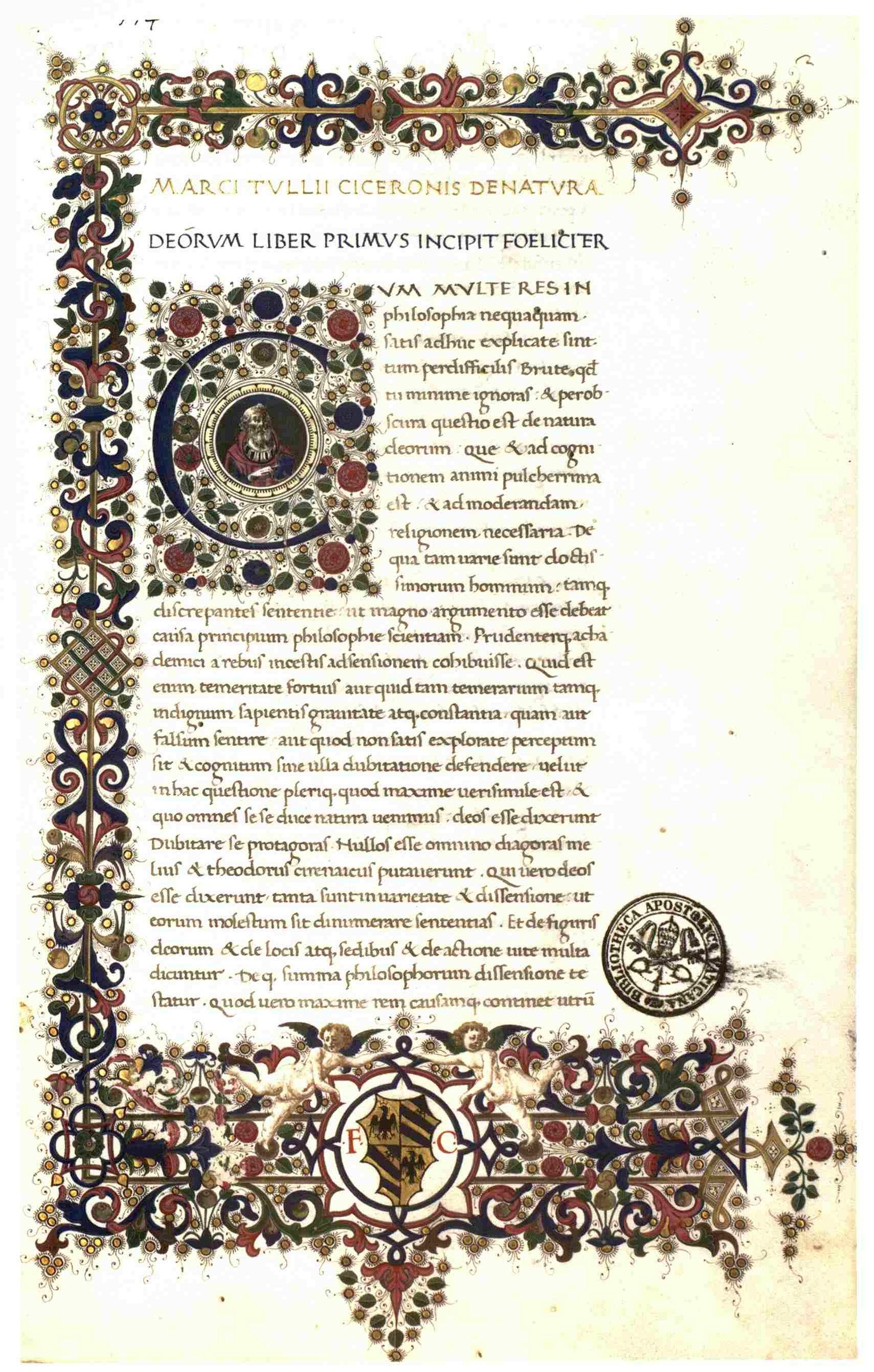
15th-century manuscript of De Natura Deorum

- (89 BC?) Translation of Aratus' Φαινόμενα (Aratea)
- (46 BC) Paradoxa Stoicorum (Stoic Paradoxes)
- (45 BC) Hortensius
- (45 BC) Academica Priora – (First edition of the Academica comprising two books, the Catullus, which is lost, and the extant Lucullus) – a book about Academic Skepticism, the school of philosophy of which Cicero was an adherent.
- (45 BC) Academica Posteriora or Academici Libri (Second edition of the Academica comprising four books, all of which except for part of book 1 has been lost. Also known as the Varro)
- (45 BC) Consolatio (Consolation) (see Consolatio)
- (45 BC) De Finibus Bonorum et Malorum (About the Ends of Goods and Evils) – a book on ethics
- (45 BC) Tusculanae Quaestiones (Tusculanae Disputationes: Questions debated at Tusculum)
- (45 BC) Translation of Plato's Timaeus (sections 27d – 47b)
- (? BC) Translation of Plato's Protagoras – testimonia quoted in Priscian, Jerome, and Donatus
- (45 BC) De Natura Deorum (On the Nature of the Gods)
- (45 BC) De Divinatione (On Divination)
- (45 BC) De Fato (On Fate)
- (44 BC) Cato Maior de Senectute (Cato the Elder on Old Age)
- (44 BC) Laelius de Amicitia (Laelius on Friendship)
- (44 BC) De Officiis (On Duties)

=== Letters ===
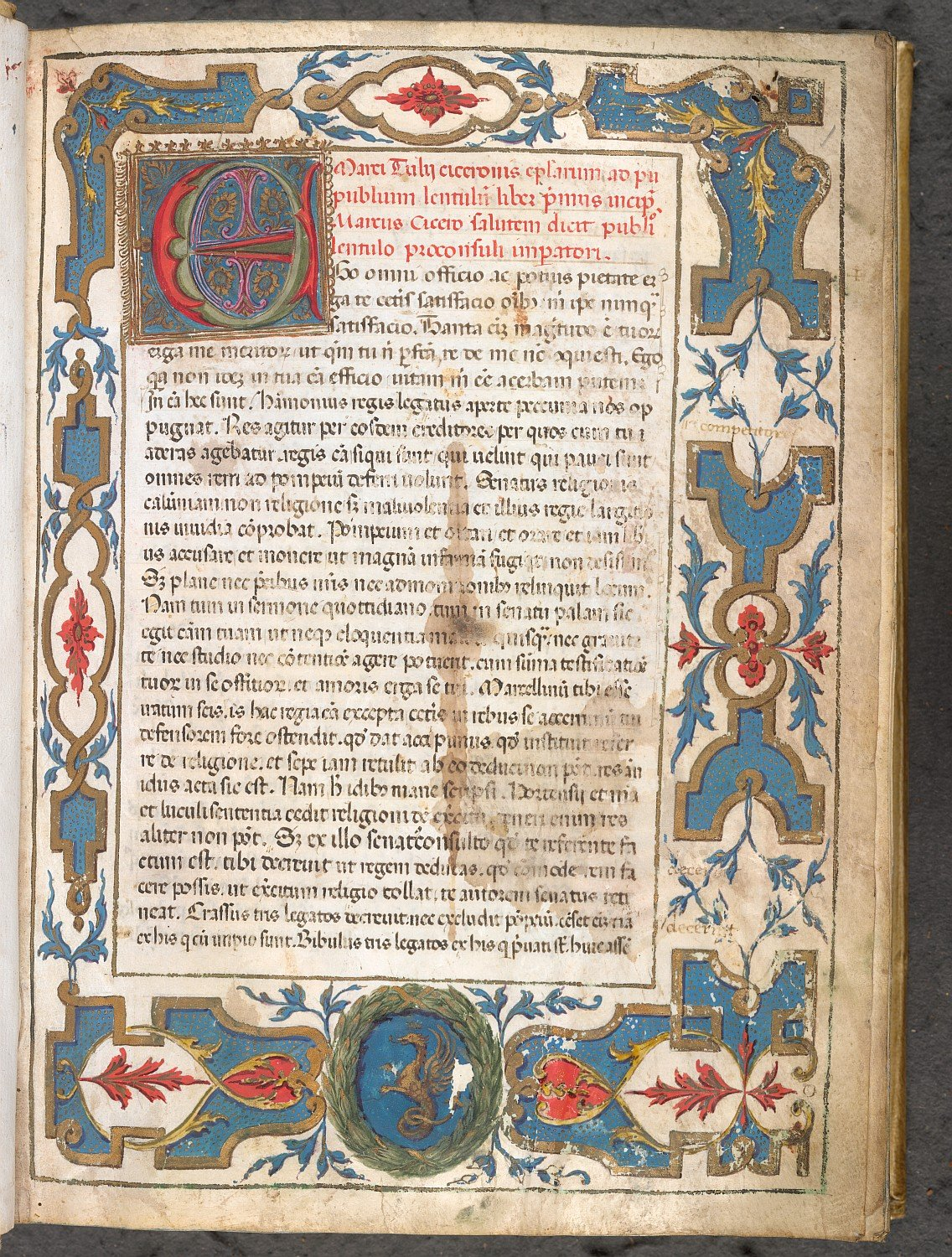
14th-century manuscript of Epistulae ad Familiares

Cicero's letters to and from various public and private figures are considered some of the most reliable sources of information for the people and events surrounding the fall of the Roman Republic. While 37 books of his letters have survived into modern times, 35 more books were known to antiquity that have since been lost. These included letters to Caesar, to Pompey, to Octavian, and to his son Marcus.

- Epistulae ad Atticum (Letters to Atticus; 68–43 BC)
- Epistulae ad Brutum (Letters to Brutus; 43 BC)
- Epistulae ad Familiares (Letters to friends; 62–43 BC)
- Epistulae ad Quintum Fratrem (Letters to his brother Quintus; 60/59–54 BC)

=== Spurious works ===
Several works extant through having been included in influential collections of Ciceronian texts exhibit such divergent views and styles that they have long been agreed by experts not to be authentic works of Cicero. They are also never mentioned by Cicero himself, nor any of the ancient critics or grammarians who commonly refer to and quote passages from Cicero's authentic works.

- (late 80s BC) Rhetorica ad Herennium (authored by a pro-Marian orator of the mid to late 80s BC sympathetic to the tribune Publius Sulpicius Rufus; perhaps Publius Canutius)
- (60s BC) Commentariolum Petitionis (Note-book for winning elections) (usually attributed to Cicero's brother Quintus)

== See also ==
- Titus Pomponius Atticus
- Caecilia Attica
- Quintus Tullius Cicero
- Marcus Tullius Tiro
- Tullia (daughter of Cicero)
- Clausula (rhetoric)
- Lorem Ipsum
- Works by Cicero
