= Gratidia gens =

The gens Gratidia was a plebeian family at ancient Rome. Originally coming from Arpinum, members of this gens are known from the final century of the Republic.

== Members ==
This list includes abbreviated praenomina. For an explanation of this practice, see filiation.

- Marcus Gratidius, the granduncle of Cicero. In 115 BC he proposed a lex tabellaria (Note: A law permitting election by ballot.) at Arpinum, which was opposed by his brother-in-law, Marcus Tullius Cicero, grandfather of the orator. In 102, he accompanied his friend, the orator Marcus Antonius, praetor in Cilicia, in his campaign against the pirates, and was slain in battle.
- Gratidia, a sister of Marcus Gratidius of Arpinum, married Marcus Tullius Cicero, grandfather of the orator.
- Gratidius, legate and probably nephew of Gaius Marius, was stoned to death at Nola in 88 BC while trying to take command of the consul Sulla's armies for the upcoming Mithridatic War.
- Marcus Gratidius M. f., son of Marcus Gratidius of Arpinum, was adopted by one of the Marii, probably a brother of Gaius Marius. As a speaker he was calm, capable, and popular, and was a good friend of his cousin, the young Cicero. Proscribed by Sulla, he was brutally slain by Catiline, who carried his head through the city.
- Gratidia M. f., possibly the sister of Gratidianus, who is thought by some scholars to have married Catiline, who would thus have been Gratidianus' brother-in-law. The historian Syme indicates that if this were so, "it can be taken that Catilina promptly discarded her."
- Marcus Gratidius, possibly a grandson of Marcus Gratidius, was legate of Quintus Tullius Cicero during his administration of Asia, from 61 to 59 BC.
- Gratidius, mentioned by Cicero as one of the tribunes of the plebs in BC 57, could perhaps be the same Marcus Gratidius who had previously served under Quintus Cicero, but is probably an error, instead referring to Quintus Fabricius.

== See also ==
- List of Roman gentes

== Bibliography ==
- Marcus Tullius Cicero, De Legibus, Brutus, De Officiis, Epistulae ad Quintum Fratrem.
- Quintus Asconius Pedianus, Commentarius in Oratio Ciceronis In Toga Candida.
- Quintus Tullius Cicero, De Petitione Consulatus (attributed).
- Gaius Sallustius Crispus (Sallust), Historiae.
- Valerius Maximus, Factorum ac Dictorum Memorabilium (Memorable Facts and Sayings).
- Lucius Annaeus Seneca, De Ira (On Anger).
- Gaius Plinius Secundus, Historia Naturalis (Natural History).
- Lucius Mestrius Plutarchus (Plutarch), Lives of the Noble Greeks and Romans.
- Paulus Orosius, Historiarum Adversum Paganos (History Against the Pagans).
- Wilhelm Drumann, Geschichte Roms in seinem Übergang von der republikanischen zur monarchischen Verfassung, oder: Pompeius, Caesar, Cicero und ihre Zeitgenossen (History of Rome in its Transition from Republic to Empire, or Pompeius, Caesar, Cicero, and their Contemporaries), Königsberg (1834–1844).
- Dictionary of Greek and Roman Biography and Mythology, William Smith, ed., Little, Brown and Company, Boston (1849).
- Dictionary of Greek and Roman Antiquities, William Smith, ed., Little, Brown, and Company, Boston (1859).
- T. Robert S. Broughton, The Magistrates of the Roman Republic, American Philological Association (1952).
- Ronald Syme, Sallust, University of California Press (1964, 2002).
- Ronald Syme, Approaching the Roman Revolution: Papers on Republican History, ed. Federico Santangelo, Oxford University Press (2016), ISBN 978-0-19-876706-0.
