= Marcus Gratidius =

Marcus Gratidius (died 102 BC) was a Roman statesman and orator from Arpinum during the late second century BC. He is best known as a result of his connections with Cicero and Marius.

== Family ==
Gratidius' sister, Gratidia, married Marcus Tullius Cicero, grandfather of the celebrated orator. His wife was Maria, sister of Gaius Marius, and they had at least one son, Marcus, who was adopted into the Maria gens, probably by his uncle, Marcus, after the elder Gratidius' death, and became known as Marcus Marius Gratidianus. A Marcus Gratidius who was legate to Quintus Tullius Cicero in Asia, from 61 to 59 BC, may have been his grandson.

== Career ==
Marcus Gratidius first appears in history as the proposer of a lex tabellaria at Arpinum. (Note: A law that permitted voting by ballot in elections or trials; four such laws were passed at Rome between 139 and 107 BC. Previously, voting in elections and trials was by word of mouth, although balloting seems to have been permitted in the passage and repeal of laws.) The law was opposed by Gratidius' brother-in-law, Marcus Tullius Cicero, who brought the matter to the consul Marcus Aemilius Scaurus. Scaurus agreed with Cicero, whose courage and opinions he praised, so the law was not passed.

Gratidius was a clever man and naturally talented in oratory; he was learned in Greek literature; and among his friends was Marcus Antonius, the orator and grandfather of Marcus Antonius the triumvir. Probably early in 102 BC, he gave testimony against Gaius Flavius Fimbria, who had probably been accused of repetundae, or extortion, in the administration of his province the previous year.

Later that year, Gratidius accompanied his friend, the praetor Marcus Antonius, who had been assigned the province of Cilicia, and given proconsular authority to fight the pirates. (Note: Drumann erroneously places this campaign in the previous year, BC 103; but as Gratidius died in the course of the campaign, and had already given evidence against Fimbria, it must have occurred in 102. Fimbria was consul in 104, and would thus have held his province in 103; he would not have been prosecuted until his return.) Gratidius served as prefect under Antonius, and was killed in the course of the campaign.

== See also ==
- Gratidia gens

== Bibliography ==
- Marcus Tullius Cicero, De Legibus, Brutus.
- Valerius Maximus, Factorum ac Dictorum Memorabilium (Memorable Facts and Sayings).
- Wilhelm Drumann, Geschichte Roms in seinem Übergang von der republikanischen zur monarchischen Verfassung, oder: Pompeius, Caesar, Cicero und ihre Zeitgenossen (History of Rome in its Transition from Republic to Empire, or Pompeius, Caesar, Cicero, and their Contemporaries), Königsberg (1834–1844).
- Dictionary of Greek and Roman Biography and Mythology, William Smith, ed., Little, Brown and Company, Boston (1849).
- Dictionary of Greek and Roman Antiquities, William Smith, ed., Little, Brown, and Company, Boston (1859).
- T. Robert S. Broughton, The Magistrates of the Roman Republic, American Philological Association (1952).
