= Maria gens =

Family in ancient Rome

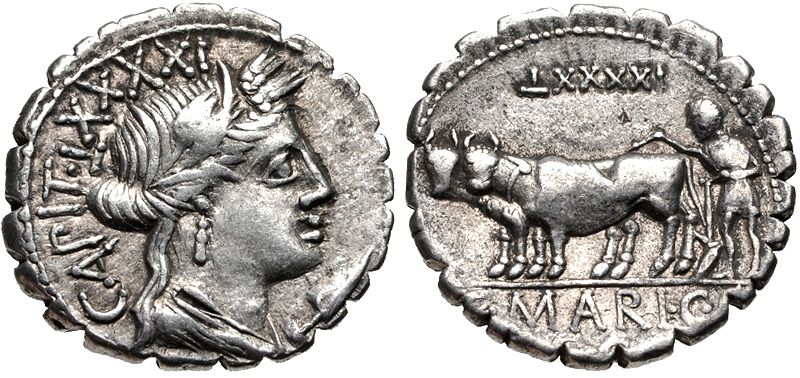
Denarius of Gaius Marius Capito, 81 BC. Ceres is shown on the obverse, while the reverse depicts a ploughman with yoke of oxen.

The gens Maria was a plebeian family of Rome. Its most celebrated member was Gaius Marius, one of the greatest generals of antiquity, and seven times consul.

== Origin ==
As a nomen, Marius is probably derived from the Oscan praenomen Marius, in which case the family may be of Sabine or Sabellic background, although in this form the name is Latinized, and the family cannot be proven to have originated anywhere other than Rome.

== Praenomina ==
The Marii of the Republic used the praenomina Marcus, Gaius, Lucius, Quintus, and Sextus. Publius and Titus are found in imperial times.

== Branches and cognomina ==
The Marii of the Republic were never divided into any families, though in course of time, more especially under the emperors, several of the Marii assumed surnames. The only cognomen found on coins is Capito.

== Members ==
This list includes abbreviated praenomina. For an explanation of this practice, see filiation.

- Quintus Marius, triumvir monetalis between 189 and 180 BC.
- Marcus Marius, a native of Sidicinum, and a contemporary of Gaius Gracchus, about whom Aulus Gellius relates a story, showing the gross indignity with which Roman magistrates sometimes treated the most distinguished men among the allies.
- Gaius Marius, grandfather of the general Marius.
- Gaius Marius C. f., father of the general Marius, married Fulcinia.
- Gaius Marius C. f. C. n., conqueror of the Cimbri and Teutones, consul in 107, 104, 103, 102, 101, 100, and 86 BC.
- Marcus Marius C. f. C. n., a brother of the general, later adopted his nephew Marcus Gratidius as his own son.
- Gaius Marius C. f. C. n., son of the general Marius, was consul in 82 BC, and perished that year while fleeing Sulla's army.
- Gaius Marius, a senator, and relative of the general Marius.
- Marcus Marius Gratidianus, son of the general Marius' sister by Marcus Gratidius, subsequently adopted by the general's brother, Marcus.
- Gaius Marius C. f. Capito, triumvir monetalis in 81 BC. A partisan of Sulla, the appearance of his cognomen on his coins served to distinguish and distance him from the late Gaius Marius and his supporters.
- Marcus Marius, quaestor in 76 BC, was Sertorius' representative to the court of Mithradates of Pontus.
- Gaius Marius, the name assumed by someone who claimed to be a grandson of the general Marius, but was put to death by Marcus Antonius.
- Marcus Marius, pleaded the cause of the Valentini before Verres. Cicero describes him as homo disertus et nobilis.
- Marcus Marius, a close friend and neighbor of Cicero.
- Lucius Marius, tribune of the plebs with Cato Uticensis, with whom he brought forward a law De Triumphis, in 62 BC.
- Lucius Marius L. f., supported the prosecution of Marcus Aemilius Scaurus for extortion in 54 BC.
- Decimus Marius Niger, was mentioned among the heirs of Gaius Cestius, a friend of Cicero.
- Sextus Marius, legate of Publius Cornelius Dolabella in Syria, in 43 BC.
- Gaius Marius C. f., (Note: Generally found with the surname Trogus, based on Eckhel's reading of the abbreviation Tro on his coins; but this probably identified him as a member of the tribus Tromentina.) triumvir monetalis under Augustus in 13 BC.
- Gaius Marius Marcellus, a legate in the time of Augustus.
- Titus Marius C. f. Siculus, a native of Urbinum, rose from the rank of a common soldier to honors and riches, by the favor of Augustus; a tale is told of him by Valerius Maximus.
- Marius Nepos, a man of praetorian rank, was expelled from the senate by Tiberius in AD 17, due to the enormity of his debts.
- Quintus Marius Celsus, praetor peregrinus in AD 31.
- Sextus Marius, a man of immense wealth, condemned to death and thrown from the Tarpeian Rock under the emperor Tiberius, who coveted his riches, in AD 33.
- Marius Cordus, consul suffectus in either AD 45 or 47, and proconsul of Asia from 55 to 56.
- Publius Marius, consul in AD 62.
- Aulus Marius Celsus, consul suffectus ex Kal. Jul. in 69. Under Nero, he commanded the fifteenth legion in Pannonia, and joined Corbulo against the Parthians in AD 64. He faithfully served both Galba and Otho during the year of the four emperors, and was rewarded for his fidelity when Vitellius allowed him to take up the consulship granted him by Otho.
- Marius Maturus, procurator of the Alpes Maritimae during the war between Otho and Vitellius.
- Gaius Marius Marcellus Octavius Publius Cluvius Rufus, consul suffectus in AD 80.
- Marius Priscus, proconsul of Africa in AD 100, during the reign of Trajan, accused of extortion and cruelty.
- Lucius Marius L. f. Maximus Perpetuus Aurelianus, consul suffectus in an uncertain year, probably in the final years of the second century.
- Marius Secundus, governor of Phoenicia and Egypt under the emperor Macrinus, slain during the chaos that attended the victory of Elagabalus.
- Gaius Marius Pudens Cornelianus, legate of the seventh legion in Spain, in AD 222.
- Lucius Marius Perpetuus, consul in the early third century, was perhaps a brother of Marius Maximus.
- Lucius Marius Maximus, consul in AD 223 and 232, perhaps the same person as the historian Marius Maximus.
- Marius Maximus, a historian, perhaps of the early third century, who wrote lives of the emperors from Trajan to Elagabalus, and was regularly cited by the Augustan historians.
- Marcus Marius M. f. Titius Rufinus, consul suffectus in an uncertain year, during the reign of Severus Alexander.
- Marius Perpetuus, consul in AD 237.
- Maria Aurelia (or Aureliana) Violentilla, daughter of one of the Marii Perpetui, married Quintus Egnatius Proculus, consul suffectus about AD 219.
- Maria T. f. Casta, wife of Lucius Maesius Rufus, a military tribune with the fifteenth legion in Syria.
- Lucius Marius L. f. Vegetinus Marcianus Minicianus Myrtilianus, legate of the twenty-second legion in Hispania Baetica, was consul suffectus in an uncertain year.
- Lucius Marius L. f. L. n. Vegetinus Lucanus Tiberenus, son of Minicianus and Claudia Artemidora, died at the age of six months and twenty-one days.
- Maria L. f. L. n. Rufina, daughter of Minicianus and Claudia Artemidora, died aged four months and seven days.
- Marcus Aurelius Marius, emperor of the Gallic Empire in AD 269.
- Gaius Marius Victorinus, a respected grammarian, rhetorician, and philosopher of the fourth century.
- Marius Mercator, a prominent ecclesiastical writer of the fifth century.
- Decius Marius Venantius Basilius, consul in AD 484, during the reign of Odoacer.
- Marius Plotius Sacerdos, a Latin grammarian, who probably flourished no earlier than the fifth or sixth century.
- Marius Aventicensis, Gallo-Roman Bishop of Aventicum from 574 to 596.

== See also ==
- List of Roman gentes
- Marius (name)

== Bibliography ==
- Marcus Tullius Cicero, Brutus, De Legibus, De Officiis, De Oratore, Epistulae ad Atticum, Epistulae ad Familiares, Epistulae ad Quintum Fratrem, In Verrem, Philippicae.
- Quintus Tullius Cicero, De Petitione Consulatus (attributed).
- Nicolaus Damascenus, The Life of Augustus.
- Titus Livius (Livy), History of Rome.
- Valerius Maximus, Factorum ac Dictorum Memorabilium (Memorable Facts and Sayings).
- Lucius Annaeus Seneca (Seneca the Younger), De Ira (On Anger).
- Quintus Asconius Pedianus, Commentarius in Oratio Ciceronis Pro Scauro (Commentary on Cicero's Oration Pro Scauro), Commentarius in Oratio Ciceronis In Toga Candida (Commentary on Cicero's Oration In Toga Candida).
- Gaius Plinius Secundus (Pliny the Elder), Naturalis Historia (Natural History).
- Gaius Plinius Caecilius Secundus (Pliny the Younger), Epistulae (Letters).
- Publius Cornelius Tacitus, Annales, Historiae.
- Aulus Gellius, Noctes Atticae (Attic Nights).
- Appianus Alexandrinus (Appian), Bellum Civile (The Civil War), Hispanica (The Spanish Wars).
- Lucius Cassius Dio Cocceianus (Cassius Dio), Roman History.
- Aelius Lampridius, Aelius Spartianus, Flavius Vopiscus, Julius Capitolinus, Trebellius Pollio, and Vulcatius Gallicanus, Historia Augusta (Augustan History).
- Joseph Hilarius Eckhel, Doctrina Numorum Veterum (The Study of Ancient Coins, 1792–1798).
- Eutropius, Breviarium Historiae Romanae (Abridgement of the History of Rome).
- Sextus Aurelius Victor, De Caesaribus (On the Caesars).
- Dictionary of Greek and Roman Biography and Mythology, William Smith, ed., Little, Brown and Company, Boston (1849).
- Bartolomeo Borghesi, Œuvres complètes de Bartolomeo Borghesi, Paris, 1862.
- George Davis Chase, "The Origin of Roman Praenomina", in Harvard Studies in Classical Philology, vol. VIII (1897).
- C. H. V. Sutherland, Roman Imperial Coinage, volume 1 : Augustus–Vitellius (31 BC–69 AD), London, 1923 (revised 1984).
- T. Robert S. Broughton, The Magistrates of the Roman Republic, American Philological Association (1952).
- Michael Crawford, Roman Republican Coinage, Cambridge University Press (1974, 2001).
