= Tullia gens =

Ancient Roman family

The gens Tullia was a family at ancient Rome, with both patrician and plebeian branches. The first of this gens to obtain the consulship was Manius Tullius Longus in 500 BC, but the most illustrious of the family was Marcus Tullius Cicero, the statesman, orator, and scholar of the first century BC. The earliest of the Tullii who appear in history were patrician, but all of the Tullii mentioned in later times were plebeian, and some of them were descended from freedmen. The English form Tully, often found in older works, especially in reference to Cicero, is now considered antiquated.

== Origin ==
The nomen Tullius is a patronymic surname, derived from the old Latin praenomen Tullus, probably from a root meaning to support, bear, or help. The Tullii of the Republic sometimes claimed descent from Servius Tullius, the sixth King of Rome, who according to some traditions was the son of Servius Tullius, a prince of Corniculum who was slain in battle against the Romans under Lucius Tarquinius Priscus, the fifth Roman king. However, the Roman historians report that the Tullii were one of the Alban noble families that came to Rome after the destruction of their city during the reign of Tullus Hostilius, the third King of Rome. This would probably make the Tullii one of the gentes minores, the lesser patrician houses of the Republic.

== Praenomina ==
The main praenomina used by the Tullii were Marcus and Lucius. To these, the Tullii Cicerones added Quintus. Manius is found only among the patrician Tullii at the beginning of the Republic, and there are individual instances of Sextus and Tiberius.

== Branches and cognomina ==
The patrician Tullii bore the cognomen Longus, tall, but only one of them appears in history. The notable plebeian families bore the surnames Decula and Cicero. The latter, among the most famous of Roman cognomina, belongs to a common class of surnames derived from familiar objects. This family came from Arpinum, the inhabitants of which were granted Roman citizenship in 188 BC. Plutarch reports that the surname was given to an ancestor of the orator, who had a cleft in the tip of his nose in the shape of a chickpea, or cicer. At the beginning of his career, Cicero was urged to adopt a more auspicious surname, but he declined, stating that he would make the name famous. Most other surnames found with the Tullii of the Republic belonged to freedmen, but a number of the family bore no cognomen.

== Members ==
This list includes abbreviated praenomina. For an explanation of this practice, see filiation.

=== Early Tullii ===
- Servius Tullius, according to one tradition, the prince of Corniculum, husband of Ocrisia, and father of Servius Tullius, the sixth King of Rome, fell in battle when Corniculum was taken by Lucius Tarquinius Priscus.
- Servius Tullius Ser. f., the sixth King of Rome, traditionally reigned from 578 to 534 BC. He is said to have defeated Veii, enlarged the sacred boundary of Rome, and enclosed the city with a stone wall, established the Temple of Diana, and an alliance with the Latins, and undertook significant reforms of the Roman constitution, establishing the Comitia Centuriata and the Servian tribes.
- Marcus Tullius, (Note: Dionysius gives his name as Marcus Atilius.) a duumvir sacris faciundis in the reign of Tarquinius Superbus, the seventh and last King of Rome, was paid by a certain Petronius Sabinus to allow him to copy one of the Sibylline books. The king punished Tullius by having him sewn into a leather sack, and cast into the sea.
- Manius Tullius Longus, consul in 500 BC, besieged the city of Fidenae when its inhabitants revolted, but withdrew his army when the Fidenates sought to negotiate a peace. He and his colleague then suppressed a conspiracy to restore the Tarquins. While opening the Ludi Romani, Tullius was badly injured when he fell from his chariot. He died three days later.
- Manius Tullius Tolerinus, (Note: Perhaps the same person as Manius Tullius Longus, the consul of 500 BC, although Longus is supposed to have died during his consulship; the connection of this name with the mysterious events of 486 is uncertain.) according to Festus, one of several persons burned at the Circus Maximus in 486 BC, (Note: Broughton explains that Festus refers to such an incident, but the manuscript explaining it is defective. Valerius Maximus says that Publius Mucius, a tribune of the plebs, burned nine of his colleagues for conspiring with Cassius, but Broughton notes that there were probably not ten tribunes of the plebs at this period, and that most or all of the names given by Festus belong to patricians, seven of them apparently corresponding with those of former consuls, so Broughton concludes that they were not tribunes of the plebs, although they might have been military tribunes, and that the nature of the event in question is not at all certain.) possibly on the charge of conspiring with Spurius Cassius Vecellinus.
- Attius Tullius, (Note: Livy and Zonaras give Tullius, which is preferred by modern historians, but Dionysius calls him Tullus Attius, giving the form normally used as a praenomen, while Plutarch calls him Tullus Aufidius. Attius is a known praenomen, most familiar from Attius Clausus, the Sabine nobleman who removed to Rome, where he was known as Appius Claudius. However, Attius is also found as a nomen gentilicium in imperial times.) a leader of the Volscians early in the fifth century BC, who gave shelter to Gaius Marcius Coriolanus following his exile from Rome, and encouraged him to take up arms against the Romans.
- Sextus Tullius, a centurion primus pilus in 358 BC, sought permission from the dictator Gaius Sulpicius Peticus to engage the Gauls in battle. He and his colleagues fought with conspicuous bravery. His martial prowess was displayed again in the following year, when he served under the consul Gaius Marcius Rutilus at Privernum.

=== Tullii Cicerones ===
- Marcus Tullius Cicero, grandfather of the orator, was one of the leading men of Arpinum. In 115 BC, the consul Marcus Aemilius Scaurus complimented him on his industry and foresight when he and his brother-in-law, Marcus Gratidius, petitioned on behalf of their city for the right to vote by ballot.
- Marcus Tullius M. f. Cicero, father of the orator Cicero, was a learned man of literary interests, and moved to Rome in order to provide the best of education for his sons. He kept company with the leading orators and jurists of his day, and died in 64 BC, the year his son was elected consul.
- Lucius Tullius M. f. Cicero, uncle of the orator, was a close friend of Marcus Antonius, the orator, with whom he traveled to Cilicia during the latter's government there. He provided his nephew with regular correspondence for a number of years.
- Marcus Tullius M. f. M. n. Cicero, the orator, was consul in 63 BC, when he suppressed the conspiracy of Catiline, although he was later exiled for having put the conspirators to death without a trial. After his recall, he generally opposed the first triumvirate, and Caesar in particular, although Caesar deeply admired him, and gladly pardoned him for siding with his enemies. He played no part in Caesar's assassination, but was friend and advisor to the conspirators, and placed himself in opposition to the second triumvirate, by which he was proscribed and put to death. Cicero was the most eminent of the Roman orators, and one of the leading scholars of Roman history and institutions. His vast body of surviving speeches, treatises, and correspondence forms one of the most important sources of Roman history.
- Quintus Tullius M. f. M. n. Cicero, the younger brother of Cicero, was praetor in 62 BC, and subsequently governor of Asia. He was one of Caesar's generals during the Gallic Wars, but later supported Pompeius during the Civil War. After Caesar's murder, he was proscribed and put to death by the triumvirs.
- Lucius Tullius L. f. M. n. Cicero, the cousin and close friend of the orator, whom he accompanied to Athens in 79 BC, and assisted during the trial of Verres. The people of Syracuse honoured him for his efforts on their behalf. Marcus was deeply aggrieved when Lucius died in 68, while still a young man.
- Tullia L. f. M. n., cousin of the orator and wife of Lucius Aelius Tubero.
- Tullia M. f. M. n., or Tulliola, the beloved daughter of Cicero, married first Gaius Calpurnius Piso Frugi, who died in 57 BC, then briefly to Furius Crassipes, whom she divorced, then in 50 to Publius Cornelius Dolabella, by whom she had two sons; one who died in infancy, and another, Lentulus, who probably died in childhood. Tullia and Dolabella were divorced before the birth of their second son, and she died shortly afterward, to her father's great sorrow.
- Quintus Tullius Q. f. M. n. Cicero, son of Quintus Cicero, attempted to hide his father from the triumvirs, and was tortured, then put to death along with his father, who gave himself up in the hope of saving his son.
- Marcus Tullius M. f. M. n. Cicero, son of the orator, joined the liberatores, Brutus and Cassius after the murder of his father and uncle in the proscription of the triumvirs. He obtained the pardon of Octavian after the Battle of Philippi, and later took his side against Mark Antony. He was consul in 30 BC.

=== Others ===
- Marcus Tullius, triumvir monetalis in 120 BC. He was perhaps the father of Marcus Tullius Decula, the consul of 81 BC.
- Marcus Tullius Decula, consul in 81 BC, during the dictatorship of Sulla.
- Marcus Tullius, claimed that his neighbor, Publius Fabius, with whom he was engaged in a property dispute, had murdered several of his slaves. Cicero spoke on his behalf in a partially-preserved speech. He does not seem to be identified with any of the other Marci Tullii known from this period of history.
- Lucius Tullius, an eques, was leader of those who collected the taxes from the scriptura, the cattle grazed upon public land, in Sicily in the time of Verres.
- Lucius Tullius, a friend of Titus Pomponius Atticus, served as a legate under Cicero during his government of Cilicia. Cicero did not consider his performance adequate.
- Marcus Tullius M. l. Tiro, a scribe and freedman of Cicero, became a notable author in his own right. He wrote on the Latin language, and a life of Cicero, which has been lost; he may have been the chief compiler and preserver of Cicero's correspondence. He was credited with inventing a variety of shorthand, and to have lived to the age of one hundred.
- Marcus Tullius M. f. Laurea, apparently the same man as Laurea Tullius, a freedman of Cicero, who was known for his elegiac poetry, and several epigrams that have survived to the modern day. (Note: A misreading of M. Tullius appears to have led to Laurea's epigrams being attributed to Satullius and Tatullius.)
- Tullius Rufus, a partisan of Pompeius, who was killed at the Battle of Thapsus in 46 BC. He had been quaestor, but the year is uncertain.
- Tiberius Tullius, a partisan of Pompeius during the war in Spain, in 45 BC.
- Tullius Bassus, or possibly Julius Bassus, a writer on medicine and botany, perhaps belonging to the early first century.
- Lucius Tullius Montanus, a companion of the younger Marcus Tullius Cicero on his journey to Athens in 45 BC.
- Lucius Tullius Cimber, a misreading of Lucius Tillius Cimber, one of Caesar's assassins.
- Tullius Senecio, one of Nero's friends, who joined in the Pisonian conspiracy, and was forced to take his own life after his participation was discovered.
- Tullius Flavianus, a cavalry commander serving under Quintus Petillius Cerialis during the civil war between Vitellius and Vespasian. He was captured by Vitellius while fighting in the neighborhood of Rome.
- Tullius Valentinus, one of the leaders of the Treveri in AD 70, during the Batavian Rebellion. He joined with Julius Tutor in opposing Quintus Petillius Cerialis, and put to death the legates of two legions that had surrendered to Julius Classicus, but was captured by Cerealis at Rigodulum, and was sent to Mucianus and Domitian, by whom he was put to death.
- Publius Tullius Varro, consul suffectus in April of AD 127.
- Tullius Geminus, a poet whose epigrams are preserved in the Greek Anthology. The surviving examples describe works of art, and display a number of affectations. A few epigrams attributed solely to Tullius might have been authored by either Tullius Geminus or Marcus Tullius Laurea.

== See also ==
- List of Roman gentes

== Bibliography ==
- Marcus Tullius Cicero, Brutus; De Finibus Bonorum et Malorum; De Lege Agraria contra Rullum; De Legibus; De Officiis; De Oratore; De Republica; Epistulae ad Atticum; Epistulae ad Familiares; In Verrem; Tusculanae Quaestiones.
- Gaius Julius Caesar (attributed), De Bello Africo (On the African War); De Bello Hispaniensis (On the War in Spain).
- Dionysius of Halicarnassus, Romaike Archaiologia (Roman Antiquities).
- Titus Livius (Livy), History of Rome.
- Publius Ovidius Naso (Ovid), Fasti.
- Marcus Manilius, Astronomica.
- Valerius Maximus, Factorum ac Dictorum Memorabilium (Memorable Facts and Sayings).
- Lucius Annaeus Seneca (Seneca the Younger), Epistulae Morales ad Lucilium (Moral Letters to Lucilius).
- Gaius Plinius Secundus (Pliny the Elder), Historia Naturalis (Natural History).
- Marcus Valerius Martialis (Martial), Epigrammata (Epigrams).
- Publius Cornelius Tacitus, Annales, Historiae.
- Plutarchus, Lives of the Noble Greeks and Romans.
- Lucius Annaeus Florus, Epitome de T. Livio Bellorum Omnium Annorum DCC (Epitome of Livy: All the Wars of Seven Hundred Years).
- Appianus Alexandrinus (Appian), Bellum Civile (The Civil War).
- Aulus Gellius, Noctes Atticae (Attic Nights).
- Festus, Breviarum Rerum Gestarum Populi Romani (Summary of the History of the Roman People).
- Caelius Aurelianus, Celerum Passionum, or De Morbis Acutis (translation of Soranus of Ephesus, On Acute Diseases).
- Joannes Zonaras, Epitome Historiarum (Epitome of History).
- Johann Albert Fabricius, Bibliotheca Graeca, sive Notitia Scriptorum Veterum Graecorum (The Greek Library, or Knowledge of Ancient Greek Writers), Christian Liebezeit & Theodor Christoph Felginer, Hamburg (1718).
- Pieter Burmann, Anthologia Latina (Latin Anthology), ed. Wernsdorf, (1759–1778).
- Analecta Veterum Poetarum Graecorum (Fragments by Ancient Greek Poets), Richard François Philippe Brunck, ed., Bauer and Treuttel, Strasbourg (1772–1776).
- Anthologia Graeca sive Poetarum Graecorum Lusus, ex Recensione Brunckii (The Greek Anthology, or Works of the Greek Poets, or the Collection of Brunck), Friedrich Jacobs, ed., Dyck, Leipzig (1794).
- Johann Caspar von Orelli, Onomasticon Tullianum, Orell Füssli, Zürich (1826–1838).
- Barthold Georg Niebuhr, The History of Rome, Julius Charles Hare and Connop Thirlwall, trans., John Smith, Cambridge (1828).
- Wilhelm Drumann, Geschichte Roms in seinem Übergang von der republikanischen zur monarchischen Verfassung, oder: Pompeius, Caesar, Cicero und ihre Zeitgenossen, Königsberg (1834–1844).
- Dictionary of Greek and Roman Biography and Mythology, William Smith, ed., Little, Brown and Company, Boston (1849).
- George Davis Chase, "The Origin of Roman Praenomina", in Harvard Studies in Classical Philology, vol. VIII, pp. 103–184 (1897).
- T.P. Wiseman, "Legendary Genealogies in Late-Republican Rome," in Greece & Rome, vol. 21 (1974).
- Michael Crawford, Roman Republican Coinage, Cambridge University Press (1974, 2001).
- Werner Eck & Peter Weiß, "Hadrianische Konsuln. Neue Zeugnisse aus Militärdiplomen" (Hadrianic Consuls: New Evidence from Military Diplomas), in Chiron, vol. 32 (2002).
- Treggiari, Susan (2007). Terentia, Tullia and Publilia: The Women of Cicero's Family. Women of the Ancient World (illustrated ed.). Routledge. ISBN 9781134264575.
