= Marcus Marius =

Marcus Marius may refer to:

- Marcus Marius (praetor 102 BC), brother of the seven-time consul Gaius Marius
- Marcus Marius (quaestor 76 BC), quaestor of the Roman Republic in 76 BC
- Marcus Aurelius Marius (died 269), emperor of the Gallic Empire in 269
