= Cicero and His Two Friends =

Painting by Richard Wilson

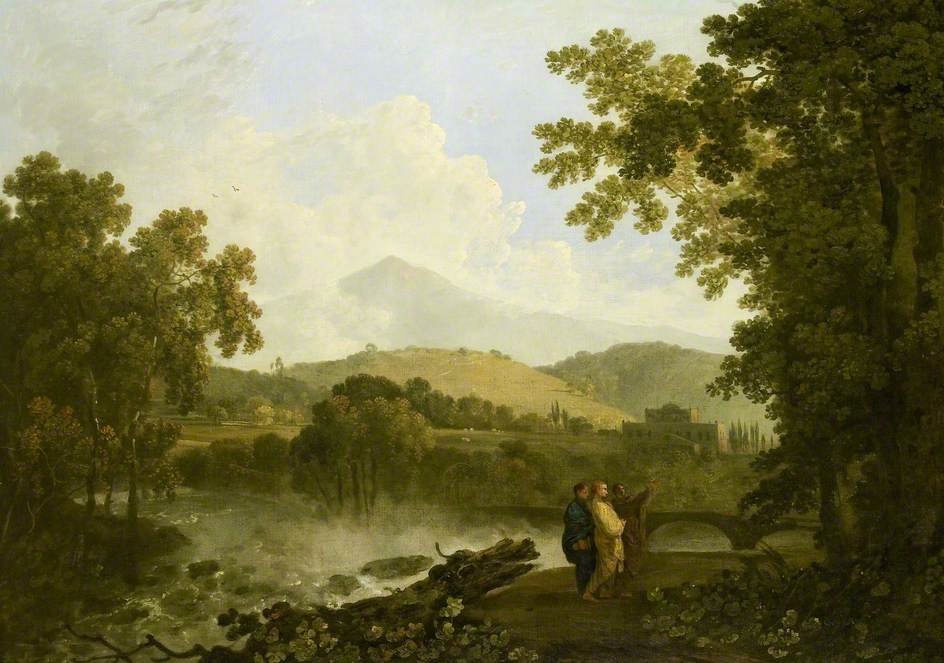
- Artist: Richard Wilson
- Year: 1770
- Type: Oil on canvas, landscape painting
- Dimensions: 91.5 cm × 129.7 cm (36.0 in × 51.1 in)
- Location: Ashmolean Museum, Oxford

Cicero and His Two Friends, Atticus and Quintus, At His Villa at Arpinum is a 1770 oil painting by the British artist Richard Wilson. It combines element of landscape and history painting. The Roman statesman and writer Cicero is shown in the grounds of his villa at Arpinum, now in the province of Lazio, accompanied by his friend Titus Pomponius Atticus and his own younger brother Quintus Tullius Cicero.

Wilson was a pioneering British landscape artist who was strongly influenced by the years he spent in Italy. A number of his works blend landscapes with scenes of Ancient history and mythology. The picture was displayed at the Royal Academy Exhibition of 1770 held at Pall Mall in London. Today it is part of the collection of the Ashmolean Museum in Oxford, having been accepted in lieu by the British government in 2007.

Wilson produced later replicas of the work, including a version now in the Art Gallery of South Australia.

== See also ==
- Cicero at His Villa at Tusculum, an 1839 painting by J.M.W. Turner

== Bibliography ==
- Pugh, Simon (ed.) Reading Landscape Country, City, Capital. Manchester University Press, 1990.
- Solkin, David H. Richard Wilson: The Landscape of Reaction. Tate Gallery, 1982.
