= Marcus Marius (praetor 102 BC) =

Roman praetor (d. 90s BC)

Marcus Marius was the younger brother of the Gaius Marius who was consul seven times.

Marcus was a few years younger than Gaius Marius, hailing from the same relatively wealthy equestrian family. During his brother's series of successive consulships between 104 and 100 BC, Marcus was elected praetor, probably for 102 BC. He served his praetorship and a following year as proconsul in Spain, probably Hispania Ulterior like his brother a decade before him. During his time there, he campaigned against Lusitanian tribes with the support of the Celtiberians and founded a city. It is also possible that his term in Spain was not prorogued if he was instead elected for 101 BC, though this is less likely. His elder brother may have manipulated the sortition of the highly sought-after province in anticipation of a possible consular campaign. Marcus, however, never attained the consulship, as he likely died in the 90s BC.

Marcus adopted a member of the Gratidii later named Marcus Marius Gratidianus. The Gratidii were a wealthy and influential family in the city of Arpinum, from which both they, the Marii, and the Tullii Cicerones hailed. Gratidianus was elected praetor twice in the 80s BC (most probably 85 and 82) and was killed during Sulla's civil war shortly after the Battle of the Colline Gate.

== Sources ==
- Broughton, Thomas Robert Shannon (1951). The magistrates of the Roman republic. Vol. 1. New York: American Philological Association.
- Evans, Richard John (1995). Gaius Marius: A Political Biography (PDF) (DLitt et Phil thesis). University of South Africa.
