= Niall Rudd =

Irish-born British classical philologist (1927–2015)

- Born: 23 June 1927; Dublin, Ireland
- Died: 5 October 2015 (aged 88)
- Occupation: Scholar

William James Niall Rudd (23 June 1927 – 5 October 2015) was an Irish-born British classical scholar.

== Life and work ==
Rudd was born in Dublin and studied Classics at Trinity College, Dublin. He then taught Latin at the Universities of Hull and Manchester. From 1958 to 1968 he was Associate Professor of Latin at University College, Toronto. In 1968 he returned to England and taught for five years as a professor of Latin at the University of Liverpool. In 1973 he moved to the University of Bristol to the chair of Latin, where he remained until his retirement in 1989. From 1976 to 1979 he was Director (Head of Department) of the Department of Classics and Archaeology.

After retirement Rudd returned to Liverpool and was appointed an Honorary Research Fellow there. Trinity College Dublin awarded him an honorary doctorate in 1998 (DLitt). Rudd died of Melanoma after a long illness (Alzheimer's) on 5 October 2015 at St. John's Hospice on the Wirral.

Rudd worked intensively with Latin literature, especially Roman poetry, and its reception in English literature of the modern age. He wrote books, monographs and articles about works of Cicero, and on the satires of Horace and Juvenal whose work he presented in English translation. This work has been published in two collections (1994, 2005). In addition, he published, in 1994, an autobiographical record of his childhood and youth in Ireland.

== Bibliography ==
- The Satires of Horace. A Study (1966) Cambridge: Cambridge University Press
- The Satires of Horace and Persius. A verse translation with an introduction and notes (1973) London: Harmondsworth Press
- Essays on Classical Literature, Selected from Arion and introduced by Niall Rudd (1974) Cambridge: Heffer Press
- Lines of Enquiry – Studies in Latin Poetry (1976) Cambridge: Cambridge University Press
- with Edward Courtney: Juvenal: Satires I, III, X (1977) Bristol: Bristol Classical Press
- T. E. Page: Schoolmaster Extraordinary (1981) Bristol: Bristol Classical Press
- The Satires of Horace (1982) Bristol: Bristol Classical Press
- Themes in Roman Satire (1986) London: Duckworth Press
- Cicero: 'De Legibus I'. (1987) Bristol: Bristol Classical Press
- Horace, Epistles Book II and Epistle to the Pisones (‘Ars Poetica’) (1989) Cambridge: Cambridge University Press
- Juvenal. The Satires (1991) Oxford: Oxford University Press
- The Classical Tradition in Operation: Chaucer/Virgil, Shakespeare/Plautus, Pope/Horace, Tennyson/Lucretius, Pound/Propertius (1994) Toronto: University of Toronto Press
- Pale Green, Light Orange. A Portrait of Bourgeois Ireland 1930-1950 (1994) Dublin: Lilliput Press
- with JGF Powell: Marcus Tullius Cicero: 'The Republic' and 'The Laws' (1998) Oxford: Oxford University Press
- with Robin G. M. Nisbet: A Commentary on Horace, Odes, Book III (2004) Oxford: Oxford University Press
- Horace, Odes and Epodes (2004) Cambridge (Massachusetts): Harvard University Press (Loeb Classical Library)
- The Common Spring. Essays on Latin and English Poetry. (2005) Exeter: Bristol Phoenix Press
- Lines of Enquiry. Studies in Latin Poetry (2005) Cambridge: Cambridge University Press
- Samuel Johnson: The Latin Poems (2005) Lewisburg: Bucknell University Press
- Landor’s Latin Poems: Fifty Pieces (2010) Lewisburg: Bucknell University Press
