= De Legibus =

Philosophical legal dialogue by Cicero

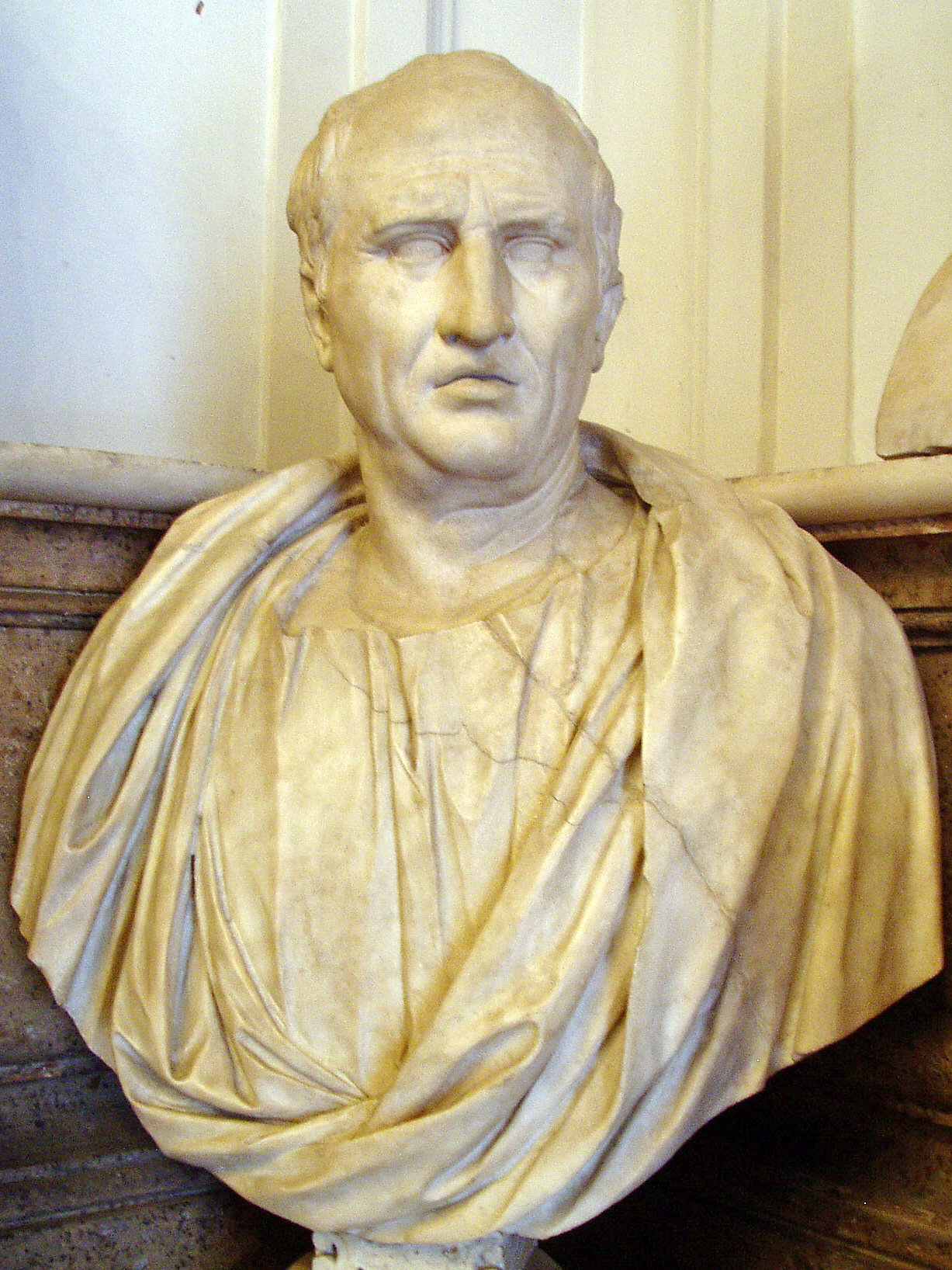
- Bust of Cicero, early 1st century AD
- Author: Marcus Tullius Cicero
- Language: Latin
- Subject: Government, philosophy, politics
- Publisher: Presumably Titus Pomponius Atticus
- Publication place: Roman Republic

On the Laws, also known by its Latin name De Legibus (abbr. De Leg.), is a Socratic dialogue written by Marcus Tullius Cicero during the last years of the Roman Republic. It bears the same name as Plato's famous dialogue, The Laws. Unlike his previous work De re publica, in which Cicero felt compelled to set the action in the times of Scipio Africanus Minor, Cicero wrote this work as a fictionalized dialogue between himself, his brother Quintus, and their mutual friend Titus Pomponius Atticus. The dialogue begins with the trio taking a leisurely stroll through Cicero's familial estate at Arpinum and they begin to discuss how the laws should be. Cicero uses this as a platform for expounding on his theories of natural law of harmony among the classes.

The three surviving books (out of an indeterminate number, although Jonathan Powell and Niall Rudd in their translation for Oxford seem to argue that it may have been six, to bring it in line with the number in de re publica), in order, expound on Cicero's beliefs in Natural Law, recasts the religious laws of Rome (in reality a rollback to the religious laws under the king Numa Pompilius) and finally talk of his proposed reforms to the Roman Constitution.

Whether or not the work was meant as an earnest plan of action is unknown. Cicero's basic conservative and traditionalist beliefs led him to imagine an idealized Rome before the Gracchi, with the classes still in harmony. From there, he reformed the worst points of the Roman constitution, while keeping the majority of it. Cicero's proposed constitution in Book Three must be seen as a renovation of the existing order, not a call to shatter the order and build anew. However, less than a decade after the accepted date for his beginning the manuscript, Julius Caesar crossed the Rubicon, launching the civil war that would end the Republic.

== Book One ==
The book opens with Cicero, Quintus and Atticus walking through the shaded groves at Cicero's Arpinum estate, where they encounter an old oak tree linked by legend to the general and consul Gaius Marius, who was born in Arpinum about a century earlier. Atticus questions whether or not the specific tree still exists, to which Quintus replies that so long as people remember the spot and the associations connected with it, the tree will exist regardless of its physical presence. The trio discuss the porous border between fact and fable in the writing of ancient Roman and Greek historians. Cicero indicates that many of the stories of the Roman kings, such as Numa Pompilius conversing with the nymph Egeria, were regarded as fables or parables, not accurate records of real incidents.

Atticus then encourages Cicero to write a work on Roman history without those flaws, which Cicero has previously suggested he might do (Note: If Cicero ever wrote such a history, it has been lost. No later writers mention a history by Cicero, so it is unlikely one was ever published.). Atticus flatters Cicero by arguing he was one of the best qualified men in Rome to write that history, given he had identified numerous flaws in the works of previous Roman historians. Cicero demurs, because he is busy studying Roman law in preparation for cases. Atticus asks Cicero to put some of his legal knowledge to use by discussing the law as they walk across his estate. Cicero then delivers an exposition on the wellspring of the law, which is the main topic of book one.

Cicero argues that law is not a matter of written statutes or lists of regulations, but was deeply ingrained in the human spirit, being an integral part of the human experience (a concept now known as natural law). His arguments are:

- Humans were created by a higher power or powers, which is engaged with the affairs of humanity. Atticus agrees to consider this for the sake of the argument, even though his Epicurean beliefs disagree with it.
- The higher power which created humans endowed them with some of its own divinity, giving humans the powers of speech, reason, and thought.
  - Due to this spark of divinity inside humans, they must de facto be related to the higher power in some fashion.
- Because humans share reasoning with the higher power, and presuming the higher power is benevolent, it follows that humans will likewise be benevolent when employing reason correctly.
- Cicero considers this benevolent application of reason to be the law. To him, the law is whatever promotes good and forbids evil. The imperfect results of this process are due to human failings, such as lusts for inconsequential outcomes such as pleasure, wealth and status. Only the application of virtue and honor lead to the correct outcomes.

== Book Two ==
The party reaches an island in the river Fibrenius, where they sit to relax and resume their discussion. Cicero and Atticus discuss whether a person can be patriotic for both their country and the region they come from within it: i.e. can someone be devoted to both Rome and Arpinum at the same time? Cicero argues that they can, and doing so is natural. He uses the example of Cato the Elder, who was a Roman citizen, yet was born in Tusculum so also called himself a Tuscan. However, Cicero states that someone's birthplace is secondary to the country of their citizenship. He argues that a citizen's primary duty is to their country, for which they should be prepared to die if necessary. Atticus mentions a speech by Pompey about Rome's debt to Arpinum – two great men (Gaius Marius and Cicero himself) came from that region and gave great service to the Roman Republic.

Cicero then further elaborates his ideas about natural law. He begins by saying that law does not begin with humans, which he regards as the instruments of a higher power. Through shared morality, that higher power commands good actions and forbids evil ones. Cicero distinguishes between 'legalism' (written statute and precedent) and 'law' (right and wrong, as determined by the higher power). He argues that human laws can be good or evil, depending on whether they conform with the natural law. A human law enacted for a temporary or local purpose has force only if the public observe it and the state enforces it. In contrast, natural law does not require codification or enforcement. As an example, Cicero says that when Sextus Tarquinius raped Lucretia, there were no written laws in the Roman Kingdom governing rape, but the populace knew that what had happened was against shared morality. He argues that human laws that go against natural law do not deserve to be called 'law', and that states that enact them should not be referred to as 'states' either. He uses the analogy of an unqualified quack who claims to be a doctor but kills their patient through inappropriate treatments. Cicero argues that such treatments could not rightly be called 'medicine' or their practitioners referred to as 'doctors'.

Cicero's insistence that religious belief (the belief in the gods, or God, or the Eternal wisdom) must be the cornerstone of law leads the trio, naturally, into the framing of religious laws. The laws proposed by Cicero seem to draw mostly from even then antique statutes from Rome's earliest days, including those of Numa Pompilius, the semi-legendary second king of Rome and the laws of the Twelve Tables, according to Quintus. From thence follows a long discussion on the merits of Cicero's hypothetical decrees.

Among the things acknowledged in this section are the fact that at times religious laws have both a spiritual and a pragmatic purpose, as Cicero, when quoting the laws of the Twelve Tables and their injunction against burial or cremation within the pomerium, admits that the injunction is as much to appease fate (by not burying the dead where the living dwell) as it is to avoid calamity (by lessening the risk of fire in the city due to open-pyre cremation). After the discussions on religious laws, and with Cicero's stated objective to replicate Plato's feat by conducting a thorough discussion on the laws in one day, they move into civil law and the makeup of the government.

== Book Three ==
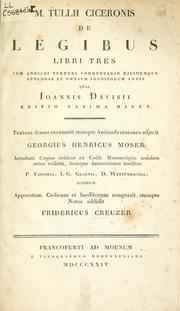
1824 edition of Book III, edited by Georg Heinrich Moser and Georg Friedrich Creuzer.

Book Three, where the manuscript breaks off, is Cicero's enumeration of the set up of the government, as opposed to the religious laws of the previous book, that he would advocate as the basis for his reformed Roman state.

=== Outline of Cicero's proposed constitution ===
- The Judicial System Cicero, who believed that the trial courts as he had seen them were too open to tampering through bribery or through sharp practice (as he had himself experienced and thwarted in the case of Gaius Verres), would place the trials back in the hands of the people at large, with the Comitia Centuriata trying cases where the penalty was death or exile, and the Concilium Plebis trying all other cases. A magistrate (Praetor or even Consul) would still preside over the trial. That same magistrate would then, upon a guilty verdict, impose a punishment unless a majority of the relevant assembly disagreed. During military campaigns, unlike in civilian trials, Cicero would remove the right of appeal from those convicted of wrongdoing.
- The Senate, in Cicero's laws, would no longer exist as merely an advisory body, but would now hold actual legislative authority, and their decrees would be binding. Any former magistrate has the right to enter the Senate. In a later portion of the dialogue, Cicero defends the apparent democracy of the change by arguing that the quasi-aristocratic Senate would serve as a counterbalance to the populist and democratic popular assemblies. Further, Cicero would impose a stipulation that only those with thoroughly unblemished behavior and reputations could remain in the order — the Censors could remove those who misbehaved at will. It was Cicero's stated hope that such a reformed Senate could serve as an example for the rest of the Roman state of probity, harmony, common interest and fair play. Acquisitiveness and greed in the Senate were to be severely punished, apparently, by Cicero's laws. This was not so much to punish the greed itself, but because greed in the Senate bred greed and dissent among the Romans. "If you're prepared to go back over the records of history, it is plain that the state has taken its character from that of its foremost men." (III.31)
  - The two Consuls, the Praetor, the Dictator, the Master of the Horse (his lieutenant), election officers and the tribunes would have the right to preside over Senate meetings. However, such meetings were to be held in what Cicero characterized as a "quiet, disciplined manner".
  - Senators must also, by Cicero's hypothetical law, be current in important affairs of state whether or not it is the particular Senator's bailiwick.
- Magistrates The basic outline of Roman society was to be kept (in keeping with Cicero's basic conservatism) but reforms to the structure were in his plan to prevent or reverse the decay of the state. From low to high, the proposed magistrates in Cicero's reformed Republic seem to be:
  - Quaestors, still with the power of the purse as normal, with the exception that Quaestorhood would no longer be the first step on the cursus honorum
  - A new magistrate who would be responsible for the safety of prisoners and the executing of sentences (he may have meant a normalization of the triumviri capitales as an elected magisterial post)
  - Minters and moneyers (again, a reform of the triumviri monetales)
  - An expansion, apparently, of the Board of Ten for Deciding Cases (or decemviri stlitibus iudicandis), whose purview would have been more than the citizenship and freedom/slavery cases they then judged (Cicero does not seem to elaborate — it may have been in the lost portion of the work)
  - Aediles, who were still responsible for public works and welfare, and who would thenceforth be the first step on Cicero's reformed cursus honorum
  - Censors, who, while holding their traditional post (conducting the census and permitting or denying membership in the Senatorial Order and otherwise ordering society), would now be a normalized elected post with the usual restriction of having been a former consul apparently removed. The Censors would also have the task of interpreting laws.
    - At the end of a magistrate's tenure, he was to give a full account to the Censor of his actions in office, whereupon the Censor would judge his fitness to remain in the Senatorial Order. This did not absolve him from prosecution for his actions.
  - A Praetor, responsible for civil cases and lawsuits. Along with him would be an indeterminate number of equally-empowered officials (although most likely under his direction — again, Cicero does not elaborate overmuch) appointed by the Senate or popular assemblies.
    - At the same time, any magistrate could preside over a trial and conduct auspices.
  - At the top would be the two Consuls, as always, with split royal power. All of these posts would be filled for terms of one year, except the Censors, which would be a five-year tenure. No person would be eligible to run for the same office twice in ten years. All age restrictions as then-currently existing for the posts would remain in force.
  - Should the state be in extremis, the Senate could appoint a dictator, who would, as in years past, be allowed a six-month term of unlimited imperium and who would appoint a lieutenant in charge of cavalry Magister Equitum who would also function as Praetor.
  - Cicero would also leave in place the ten Tribunes of the Plebeians, with their full powers of veto, and would still be sacrosanct. The Tribunes of the People would also be permitted to preside over meetings of the Senate.
    - Quintus, later in the dialogue, strongly objected to this, feeling that the Tribunes, as currently constituted, were a destabilizing force in the state, and believed that Cicero should have rolled back their powers to their severely curtailed state under the laws of Sulla. Cicero seems to argue that curtailing the power of the plebeians or giving them a sham representation of a share in government would be even more destabilizing than a potential Tiberius Gracchus or Saturninus could be. To do so, he in effect argues, would create the same Saturninii and Gracchi that Sulla's laws tried to halt. Cicero remarks: "I admit there is an element of evil inherent in the office of tribune; but without that evil we would not have the good which was the point of setting it up. 'The plebeian tribunes,' you say, 'have too much power.' Who's arguing with that? But the crude power of the people is much more savage and violent. By having a leader, it is sometimes milder than if it had none." (III:23) (from The Oxford World Classics translation by Niall Rudd)
- Should both consuls, or the Dictator, die or otherwise leave office, all other current officials from quaestor on up are removed from office. An interrex would be appointed by the Senate to arrange as soon as practicable new elections.
- Popular Assemblies: The People's Assemblies were, by law, to be free of violence, and were also legislative assemblies. In both the Senate and people's assemblies, a magistrate of a higher rank than the one presiding would be able to veto any act.
- Voting and Laws Ballots were, due to an epidemic in Cicero's time of vote tampering and bribery, not to be secret, so that they could be immediately examined for voter fraud. There was also a measure of elitism in his proposal as well, however — if the people did not know how the upper classes had voted, Cicero thought they would be confused as to which way to vote.
  - No laws were to be passed that were meant to target an individual (no doubt, this was in response to the law pushed through by Publius Clodius Pulcher in 58 BC that demanded exile for any magistrate who imposed and executed a death sentence without a vote by the Popular Assemblies — a clear reference to Cicero, who had done just that in 63 BC in response to the Catilinarian Conspiracy)
  - No magistrate could impose capital punishment or revocation of citizenship without a vote of the Comitia Centuriata
  - Bribery or seeking bribes were to be punished severely.
  - Laws would be kept in official record form, something that Cicero felt had lapsed.

After a discussion and debate between Cicero and Quintus about the Consuls and the voting rights of citizens, the manuscript breaks off.

== Provenance of the text ==
It is unclear exactly when Cicero composed de Legibus. The earliest possible date is 58 BC, because book three unmistakably refers to the Leges Clodiae enacted in that year. The latest possible date is 43 BC, the year Cicero was killed. This range covers the late part of Cicero's political and legal career, after he had served as consul in 63 BC and the formation of the First Triumvirate in 59 BC. However, the work could have been composed before, during or after the dictatorship of Julius Caesar (45-44 BC) which fatally undermined the constitution of the Roman Republic.

Much like its sister work de re publica, de Legibus exists in fragmentary condition, with no work beyond the first half of Book Three known to survive. The remaining fragments of de Legibus are scattered in three volumes at the Leiden University Library.

Further, issues of legibility and authenticity have been raised among researchers. Vienna Professor M. Zelzer in 1981 argued that the text as it is now known may have been transcribed out of a cursive (as opposed to block-text) copy at some point, incurring possible mistakes from the vagaries of the script. Others (such as translator Niall Rudd) argue that the text was still in rough-draft form at the time of Cicero's murder in December 43 BC, and that it was still to be cleaned up and edited by the author. Much like de re publica, some material was recovered from the writings of others. Two passages were found used in the third- and fourth-century writer Lactantius's Divinae Institutiones (Lactantius also quoted heavily from de re publica), and one further paragraph has been located in Macrobius' Saturnalia.

== Quotes ==
- Let the punishment fit the offense. [noxiae poena par esto.] (III, 11)

== Text and translations ==
- TVLLI CICERONIS DE LEGIBVS LIBRI TRES
- Free Audiobook version of De Legibus translated by Charles Duke Yonge
- English text on google books
