= Epistulae ad Quintum fratrem =

Letters from Cicero to his brother Quintus

Epistulae ad Quintum fratrem (English: Letters to brother Quintus) is a collection of letters from Roman politician and orator Marcus Tullius Cicero to his younger brother, by around two years, Quintus.

== History and context ==
Like Marcus Cicero's Epistulae ad familiares (Letters to friends), these letters were likely published by Cicero's freedman and personal secretary Marcus Tullius Tiro after both brothers' deaths. Letters to brother Quintus start with an advisory letter, possibly circulated publicly, advising Quintus on how to administer a province. It was sent around the start of 59 BC; at this time Quintus was proconsular governor of Asia. Following it are two letters sent when Marcus was in exile in Greece – Quintus lobbied, eventually successfully, during Marcus' absence for Marcus' exile to be lifted – followed by 19 letters exchanged from 57 to 54 BC. Quintus held various posts during these later letters: he was in Sardinia serving as one of Pompey's lieutenants in 54 before joining Caesar in Gaul. Further letters from Quintus are collected in Ad familiares (specifically letters 44, 147, 351, 352).

== Manuscripts ==
There are three major modern editions of the Latin text, a 1911 edition by H Sjögren, a 1958 edition by W S Watt, and a 1988 Teubner edition by Shackleton Bailey.

== Bibliography ==
- Shackleton Bailey, D R, ed. (2002). Letters to Quintus and Brutus. Letter Fragments. Letter to Octavian. Invectives. Handbook of Electioneering. Loeb Classical Library 462. Harvard University Press. ISBN 978-0-674-99599-4.
- Chisholm, Hugh, ed. (1911). "Cicero" . Encyclopædia Britannica (11th ed.). Cambridge University Press.
