= Commentariolum Petitionis =

Essay supposedly written by Quintus Tullius Cicero

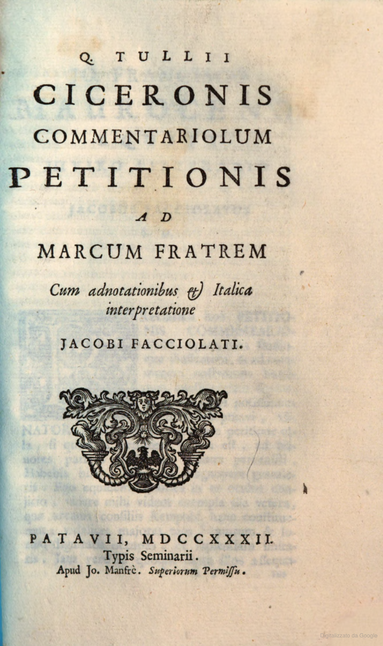
Title page of an Italian edition, 1732

Commentariolum Petitionis ("little handbook on electioneering"), also known as De petitione consulatus ("on running for the Consulship"), is an essay supposedly written by Quintus Tullius Cicero, c. 65-64 BC as a guide for his brother Marcus Tullius Cicero in his campaign in 64 to be elected consul of the Roman Republic. The essay does not provide any information that a man of politics such as Cicero would not already know, and is written in a highly rhetorical fashion. As such, its authenticity has been questioned.

Many scholars believe that it was not in fact written by Quintus for the purposes proposed, but in fact by a Roman in the Early Roman Empire, between the periods of Augustus and Trajan, as a rhetorical exercise. Such exercises were not uncommon in that time period. Others claim that it was in fact written by Quintus, but with the view to be published, perhaps as a piece of carefully distributed propaganda.

The degree to which it can be used as evidence for the electoral process and the politics of the Late Roman Republic is therefore contested.

== Manuscript tradition ==
The text of the Commentariolum Petitionis is not found in the Codex Mediceus, the best source for M. Cicero's Epistulae ad Familiares (Letters to his Friends). It does appear at the end of the Epistulae ad Quintum Fratrem (Letters to Quintus) in the codices Berolinensis and Harleianus, although Harleianus only includes sections 1-8 of the 58 sections given in the other manuscripts.

== Linguistic arguments ==
Three key points can be identified, particularly from the works of Eussner and Hendrickson, which summarise the linguistic arguments:

1. The vocabulary of the Commentariolum is not what was generally being used at the time Cicero was running for the office of consul. The use of suffragatorius in the Commentariolum is a hapax legomenon. There is some strange phrasing such as 'cur ut' and 'fac ut'.
2. The style of the Commentariolum does not match the style of Quintus. (Hendrickson also claims that the dry style shows that it is a school exercise.)
3. In the Commentariolum there are a number of linguistic structures, metaphors, and phrases corresponding to the later works of Cicero: In Toga Candida (64 BC), Pro Murena (62 BC), and Oratio de Haruspicum Responsis (56 BC).

The first two arguments have been largely refuted. Tyrell-Purser show that at least one other hapax occurs in Quintus, and that some phrases questioned by Eussner have been found in the works of Cicero and Plautus. They further argue that, with only four of Quintus' letters extant, and those fragmentary, it is difficult to gauge his style. The laudations of M. Cicero for his younger brother's style may also have been a matter of brotherly hyperbole.

The third argument cannot be refuted. Though some similarities in the Pro Murena could be due to similar subject matter, the correlations between the extant fragments of In Toga Candida and the Commentariolum are too strong to be ignored. These correlations can be (and are) argued in the opposite direction as well, however; the similarities between the Commentariolum and M. Cicero's later works may be the result of M. Cicero being influenced by the letter from his brother.

== Arguments of content ==
Henderson presents many arguments to say that the content of the Commentariolum is anachronistic or faulty:

1. The faults attributed to Catilina in Commentariolum 10 are actually those given to Clodius in De Haruspicum Responsis 42.
2. The proscription of C. Antonius Hybrida is backdated, and actually occurred in 59.
3. The trial of Q. Gallius, referenced in the Commentariolum, did not occur until 64, but after the Commentariolum
4. The author of the Commentariolum was unaware of the dual meaning of sodalitas, equally 'group of friends' and an illegal electoral group.
5. The humanitas of Cicero is backdated; it cannot be attributed to him until after his philosophical works (55-44 BC)
6. There is no mention of the Catilinarian Conspiracy, which disappears from the historical record after Livy.

Balsdon argues against many of Henderson's claims in favour of authenticity, stating that the similarities between the Commentariolum and De Haruspicum Responsis could be a matter of rhetorical similarities only. He suggests that Q. Gallius may have been tried twice, or may have entered into counsel with Cicero as early as 66 BC, though the trial did not take place for a couple years. He also suggests that the meaning of sodalitas was not changed to mean an illegal electoral group until 59. He is joined by Nisbet (who argues against authenticity) in suggesting that the proscription of Antonius may have had a far more quotidian meaning, such as the selling of property after bankruptcy, than Henderson seems to be reading into it. Richardson finally notes that the First Catilinarian Conspiracy is not mentioned until In Toga Candida, and as such takes its omission as proof of authenticity.

Nisbet adds to the arguments of context the fact that the Commentariolum identifies Cicero as worthy (dignus) of defending consulars, though at the time of his electoral campaign, Cicero had not defended anyone in court who had held the consulship. (This section of the Commentariolum also corresponds to a section of In Toga Candida.) Nisbet rejects that this could simply be an allusion to potentialities on the basis that this would be bad rhetorical form. McDermott counters that Cicero may have already agreed to defend Piso, and this would be the sort of thing known by his brother Quintus.

== Bibliography ==
- Quintus Tullius Cicero: Tipps für einen erfolgreichen Wahlkampf, bilingual ed. by Kai Brodersen, Stuttgart 2013, ISBN 3-15-010924-8
