= Epistulae ad Familiares =

Letters between Cicero and various people

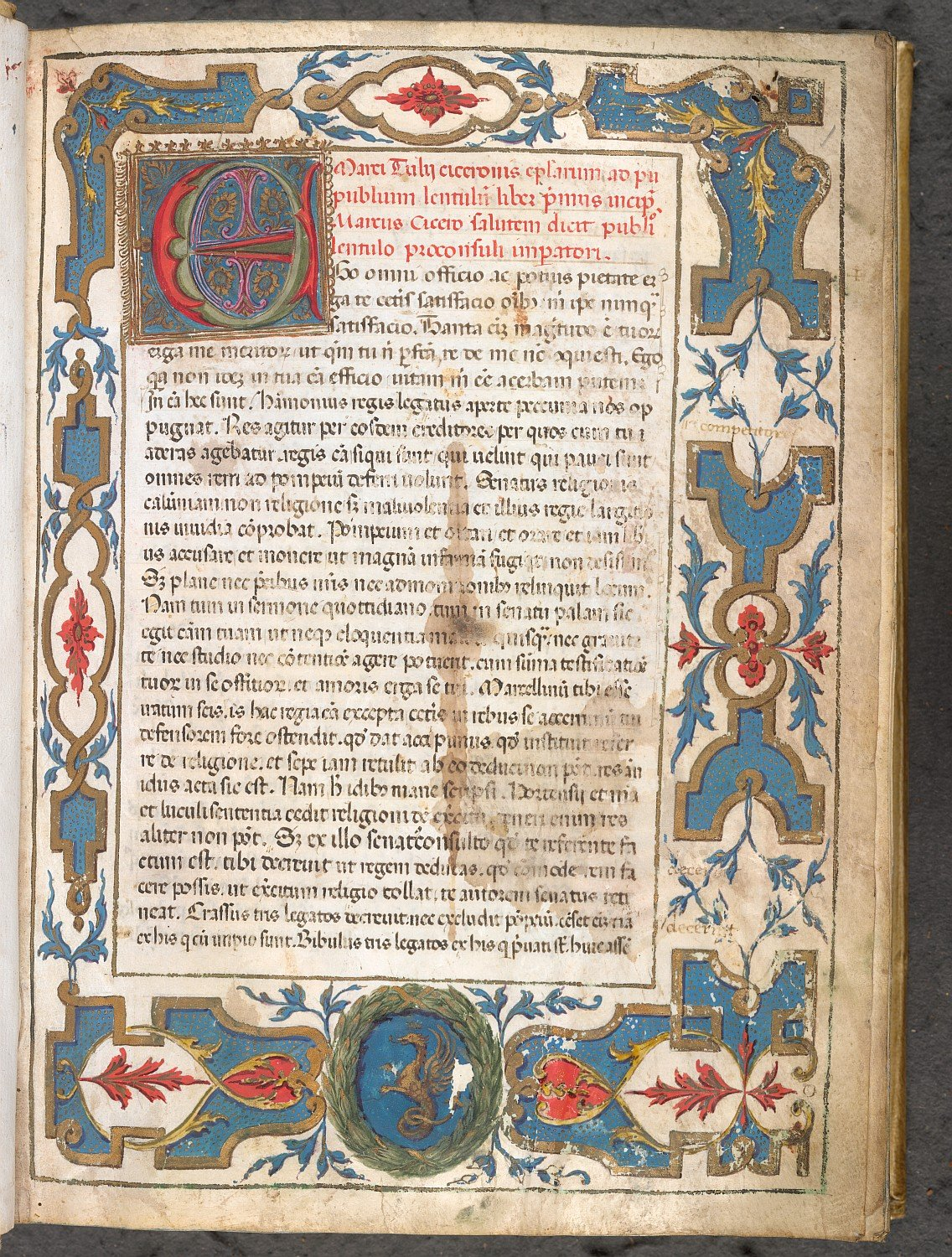
Epistulae ad Familiares, 14th-century manuscript, British Library

Epistulae ad Familiares (Letters to Friends) is a collection of letters between Roman politician and orator Marcus Tullius Cicero and various public and private figures. The letters in this collection, together with Cicero's other letters, are considered the most reliable sources of information for the period leading up to the fall of the Roman Republic. Traditionally spanning 16 books, and featuring letters from 62 to 43 BCE, the collection was likely first published by Cicero's freedman and personal secretary Marcus Tullius Tiro sometime after Cicero's death in 43 BCE.

A number of manuscript copies of this collection have reached modern times. The earliest witness to the text is a palimpsest on a single leaf, written in uncials of the fifth or sixth century (CLA IV.443; it contains portions of letters 6.9 and 6.10. Two more fragments from 12th-century manuscripts – the outer bifolium of an eight-sheet gathering containing 2.1.1–2.17.4, and a single leaf containing 5.10.1–5.12.2 – represent one medieval tradition. One complete manuscript survives containing the entire collection, written in the first half of the 9th century in several hands (M); at one point it was in the hands of bishop Leo of Vercelli, and it is included in the 9th-century library catalog of the Abbey of Lorsch; Coluccio Salutati made a copy of this manuscript in 1392; it currently resides at the Laurentian Library in Florence as manuscript 49.9. There are also two groups of medieval manuscripts which represent a tradition independent of M: one provides the text for books 1–8 (X), the other for books 9–16 (Y). The X tradition is contaminated by M, and thus is of less value than the Y tradition.
