= Brutus (Cicero) =

History of Roman oratory

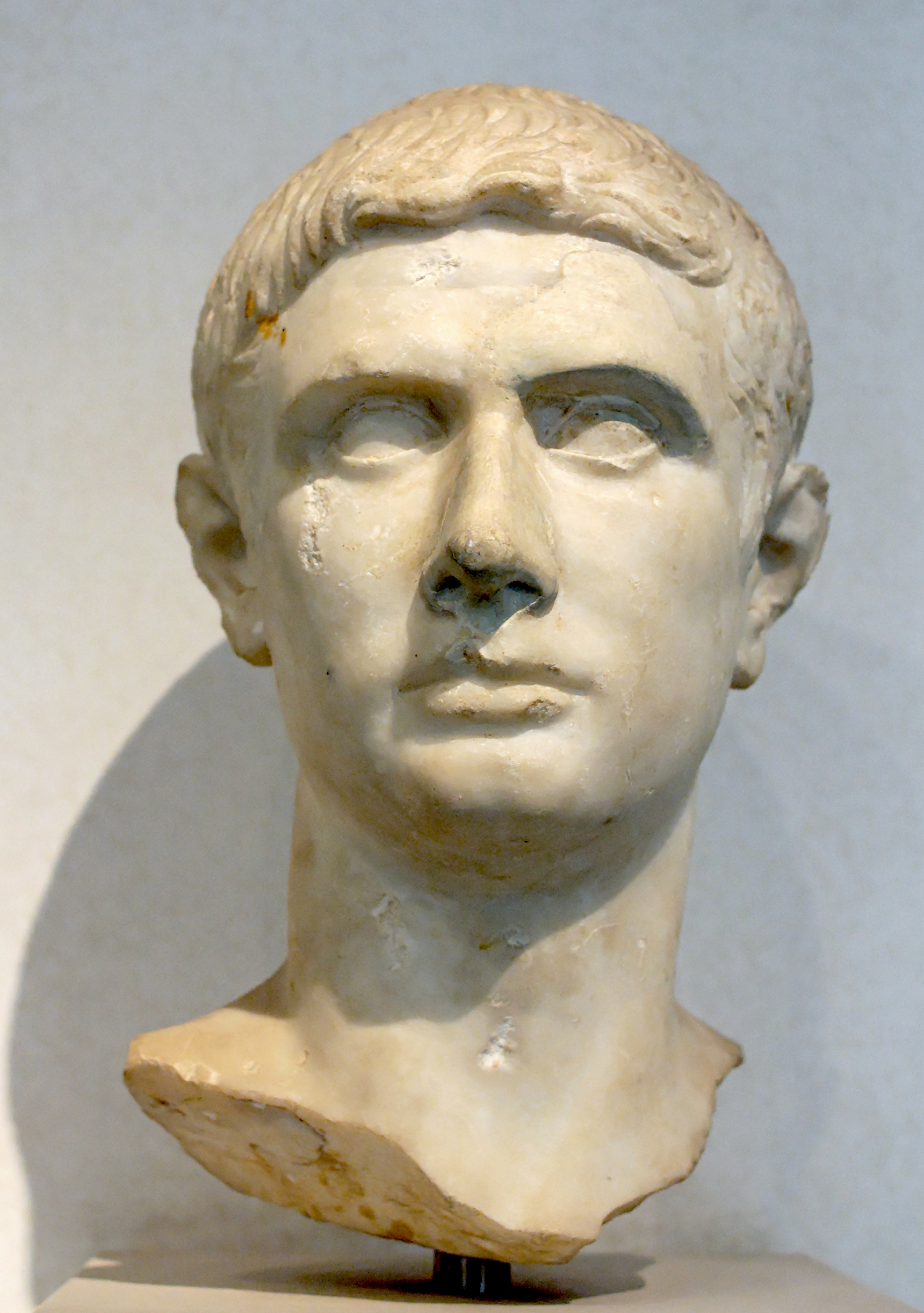
Male portrait, so-called “Brutus”. Marble, Roman artwork, 30–15 BC. From the Tiber, Rome.

Cicero's Brutus (also known as De claris oratoribus) is a history of Roman oratory. It is written in the form of a dialogue, in which Marcus Junius Brutus and Titus Pomponius Atticus ask Cicero to describe the qualities of all the leading Roman orators up to their time. Cicero then attempts to propose a reconstruction of Roman history. Although it is written in the form of a dialogue, the majority of the talking is done by Cicero with occasional intervention by Brutus and Atticus. The work was probably composed in 46 BC, with the purpose of defending Cicero's own oratory. He begins with an introductory section on Greek oratory of the Attic, Asiatic, and Rhodian schools, before discussing Roman orators, beginning with Lucius Junius Brutus, "The Liberator", though becoming more specific from the time of Marcus Cornelius Cethegus.

== Characters ==
- Cicero – He is the main figure of the work. He strengthens the idea that after the civil war, many of the "good" orators have either left or fled Rome. The few individuals who stayed behind are hiding in silence. Cicero recalls his visits to the forum and some of the orators he has been able to hear. He also mentions his study of eloquence and his dedication to philosophical studies.
- Brutus – He is a friend of Atticus and a person who does not like eloquence.
- Atticus – He is a friend of Brutus who encounters Cicero while walking somewhere. Cicero mentions that Atticus is from Athens when he discusses the beginnings of oratory. Atticus speaks the least of all the three men.

== History of eloquence ==
Cicero begins his work by lamenting the death of his friend Quintus Hortensius (who died in 50 BC) and then ponders on whether anyone should feel sad that his friend died. His dialogue then proceeds to the moment where he comes across Brutus and Atticus. They begin to discuss a letter that reveals that the Roman state has suffered numerous losses and that Rome is going through tumultuous times. Cicero proceeds and states that he wants to write a universal history of Roman oratory. Because of the fatal overthrow of the state, Cicero deems it necessary to write this history of eloquence. Cicero begins by stating that eloquence is a difficult thing to acquire and that it was first present in Atticus' home town: Athens. Oratory does not appear in the infancy of Athens, but is evident in the maturity of her power. He traces oratory from figures such as Peisistratos, Solon, Pericles, and mentions how figures like Socrates challenged them. He continues by saying that oratory was only limited to Athens and was not ubiquitous in Greece. It was from here that oratory spread through parts of Asia and the world.

Cicero then begins to trace the origins of oratory in Rome. He mentions figures like Manius Curius Dentatus, M. Popilius, Quintus Caecilius Metellus Pius Scipio Nasica and even discusses how Cato the Elder and Lysias the Athenian resemble each other in their elegance, character, and brevity. Cicero mentions the idea that Cato is overshadowed by other figures, but is still noteworthy. After Cato, new orators appeared in Rome such as Severius Galba. He also provides an example of how Galba was able to win over the court with an amazing, eloquent speech and that his people (in a court case) were freed from all charges.

== Criticism ==
Cicero's work is typically seen as a list of orators and the development of oratory in Rome. While the purpose of the Brutus is to record the history of oratory and confirm that it has failed to exist, some scholars believe that Cicero fails in his task. This is a problem because Cicero fails to include a reliable list of Roman oratory by purposely omitting figures like Gaius Marius, Sulla, Catiline, and Publius Clodius Pulcher. Scholars also argue that the Brutus is not a complete list because Cicero fails to include himself in his list.

Another criticism of the Brutus is that it lacks minuscule scene details. The work only thoroughly describes the garden and the statue of Plato where the three men plan to discuss oratory, but other than that, the work is devoid of other details. Whereas the scenery lacks details, the conversation does not.
