= Quintus Tullius Cicero =

1st Century BC Roman politician and general

- Born: 102 BC
- Died: 43 BC (aged c. 59)
- Occupations: Politician and military leader
- Office: Plebeian Aedile (65 BC); Praetor (62 BC); Proconsul of Asia (61–58 BC)
- Relatives: Marcus Tullius Cicero (brother)

Military service
- Years of service: c. 67 BC – 50 BC
- Battles/wars: Catilinarian conspiracy; Gallic Wars

Quintus Tullius Cicero (/ˈsɪsəroʊ/ SISS-ər-oh, Classical Latin: [ˈkʷiːntʊs ˈtʊlli.ʊs ˈkɪkɛroː]; 102 BC – 43 BC) was a Roman statesman and military leader, as well as the younger brother of Marcus Tullius Cicero. He was born into a family of the equestrian order, as the son of a wealthy landowner in Arpinum, some 100 kilometres (62 mi) south-east of Rome. He is known for his political career, governorship of Asia, time serving as a general in Gaul under Caesar, and for his relationship with Cicero.

== Biography ==
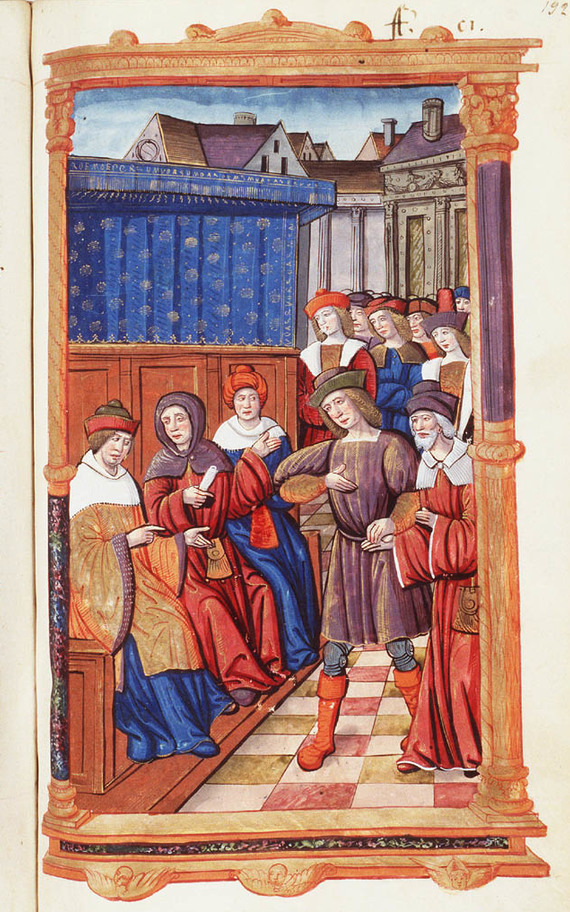
"Pompey, accompanied by a large force, brings Cicero's brother into the Forum, who petitioned for the return of Cicero from exile." (16th century anachronistic artwork)

Cicero's well-to-do father arranged for him to be educated with his brother in Rome, Athens and probably Rhodes in 79–77 BC. Around 70 BC, he married Pomponia (sister of his brother's friend Atticus), a dominant woman of strong personality. He divorced her after a long disharmonious marriage with much bickering between the spouses in late 45 BC. His brother, Marcus, tried several times to reconcile the spouses, but to no avail. The couple had a son born in 66 BC and named Quintus Tullius Cicero after his father.

Quintus was aedile in 66 BC, praetor in 62 BC, and propraetor of the province of Asia for three years (61-59 BC.) Under Caesar, during the Gallic Wars, he was legatus (accompanying Caesar on his second expedition to Britain in 54 BC and surviving a Nervian siege of his camp during Ambiorix's revolt), and was under his brother when the latter was governor in Cilicia in 51 BC. During Caesar's civil war, he supported the Pompeian faction, obtaining the pardon of Caesar later.

During the Second Triumvirate, when the Roman Republic was again in civil war, Quintus, his son, and his brother were all proscribed. He fled from Tusculum with his brother. Later, Quintus went home to bring back money for travelling expenses. His son hid his father and did not reveal the hiding place even under torture. When Quintus heard this, he gave himself up to try to save his son, but father, son, and famous brother, were killed in 43 BC as proscribed persons.

== Personality and relationship with brother Marcus ==
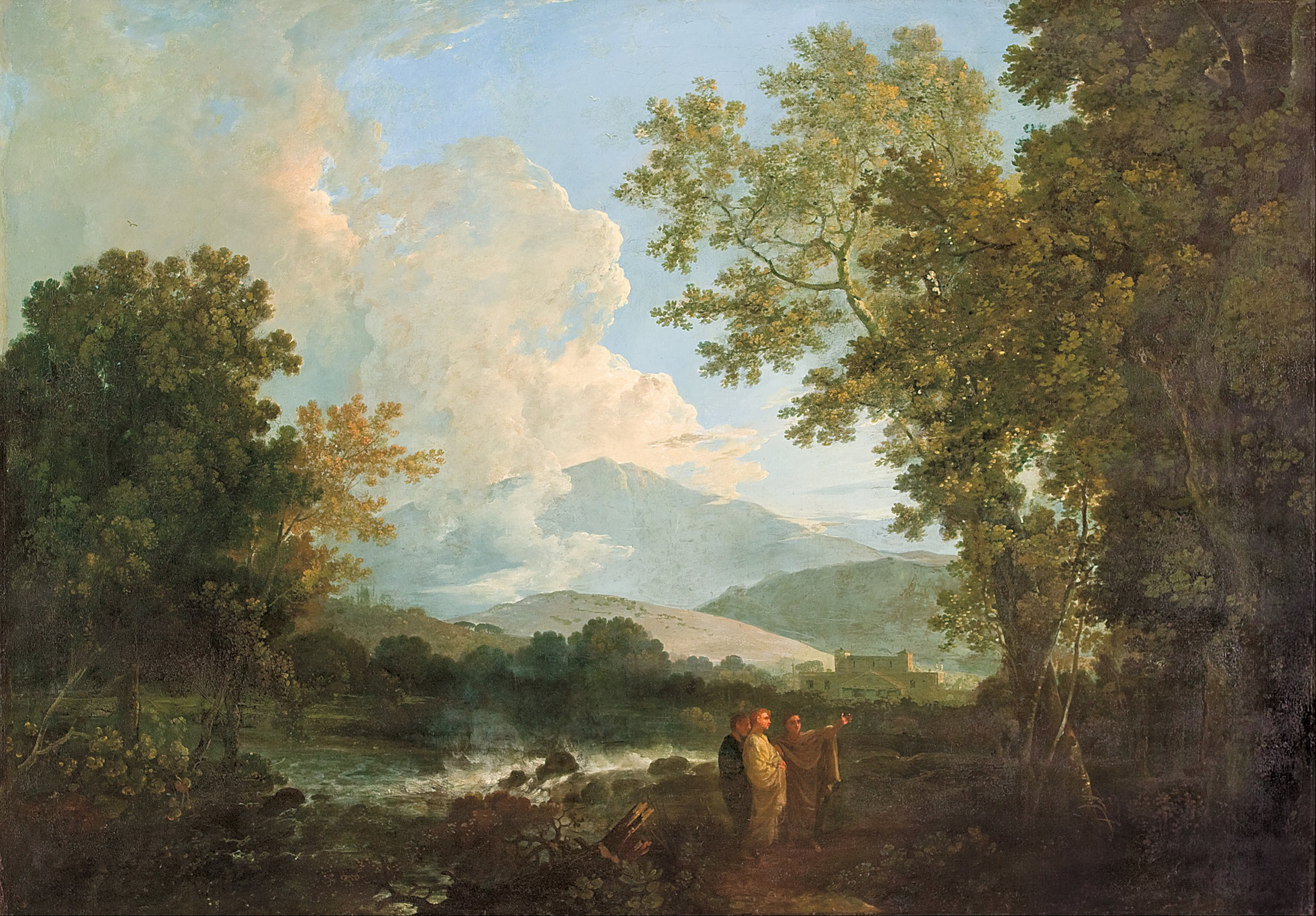
Cicero with his friend Atticus and brother Quintus, at his villa at Arpinum. (Richard Wilson, c. 1771)

Quintus is depicted by Caesar as a brave soldier and an inspiring military leader. At a critical moment in the Gallic Wars, he rallied his legion and retrieved an apparently hopeless position. Caesar commended him for this with the words "He praised Cicero and his men very highly, as they deserved". However, later the legate was purportedly responsible for a near-disaster in Gaul but does not receive condemnation from Caesar as a result.

Quintus had an impulsive temperament and had fits of cruelty during military operations, a behaviour frowned on by Romans of that time. The Roman (and stoic) ideal was to control one's emotions even in battle. Quintus Cicero also liked old-fashioned and harsh punishments, like putting a person convicted of patricide into a sack and throwing him into the sea. Such convicts were traditionally "stripped, scourged, sewn up in a sack together with [a] dog, a cock, a viper, and a monkey, and thrown into a river or the sea to drown". This punishment he meted out during his propraetorship of Asia.

His brother confessed in one of his letters to his friend Titus Pomponius Atticus (written in 51 BC while he was Proconsul of Cilicia and had taken Quintus as legatus with him) that he dares not leave Quintus alone as he is afraid of what kind of sudden ideas he might have. On the positive side, Quintus was utterly honest, even as a governor of a province, in which situation many Romans shamelessly amassed private property for themselves. He was also a well-educated man who enjoyed reading Greek tragedies, and even wrote some tragedies himself.

The relationship between the brothers was mostly affectionate, except for a period of serious disagreement during Caesar's dictatorship 49-44 BC. The many letters from Marcus ad Quintum fratrem show how deep and affectionate the brothers' relationship was, though Marcus Cicero often played the role of the "older and more experienced" sibling, lecturing to his brother on what the right thing to do was.

== Authorship ==
As an author during the Gallic Wars, he wrote four tragedies in the Greek style. Three of them were titled Troades, Erigona, and Electra, but all are lost. He also wrote several poems on the second expedition of Caesar to Britannia, three epistles to Tiro (extant) and a fourth one to his brother. The long letter Commentariolum Petitionis (Handbook on electioneering) has also survived. Although its authenticity has been much questioned, modern day scholar Andrew Lintott has argued that Quintus was the true author. It is in any case a guide to political behavior in Cicero's time.
