= Arpino =

- Comune
- Comune di Arpino
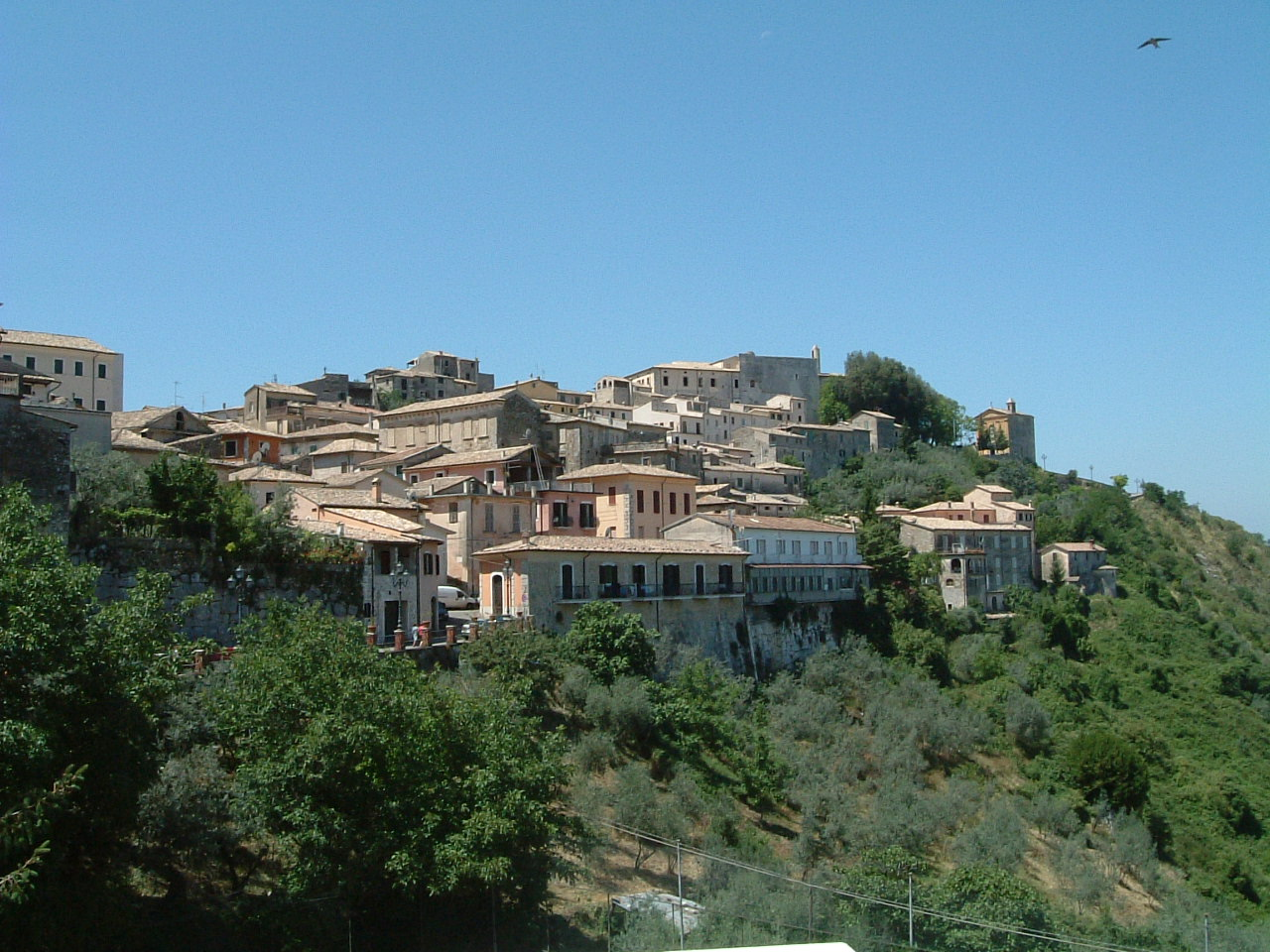
- View of Arpino

- Coat of arms

- Location of Arpino in Italy Arpino (Lazio)
- Coordinates: 41°38′52″N 13°36′35″E
- Country: Italy
- Region: Lazio
- Province: Frosinone (FR)

Government
  - Mayor: Vittorio Sgarbi (2023-Present)

Area
  - Total: 55 km^{2} (21 sq mi)
- Elevation: 447 m (1,467 ft)

Population (31 December 2017)
  - Total: 7,150
  - Density: 130/km^{2} (340/sq mi)
- Demonym: Arpinati
- Time zone: UTC+1 (CET)
  - Summer (DST): UTC+2 (CEST)
- Postal code: 03033
- Dialing code: 0776
- Patron saint: Madonna of Loreto
- Saint day: December 10
- Website: Official website

Arpino (Southern Latian dialect: Arpinë) is a comune (municipality) in the province of Frosinone, in the Latin Valley, region of Lazio in central Italy, about 100 km SE of Rome. Its Roman name was Arpinum. The town produced two consuls of the Roman Republic: Gaius Marius and Marcus Tullius Cicero.

== History ==
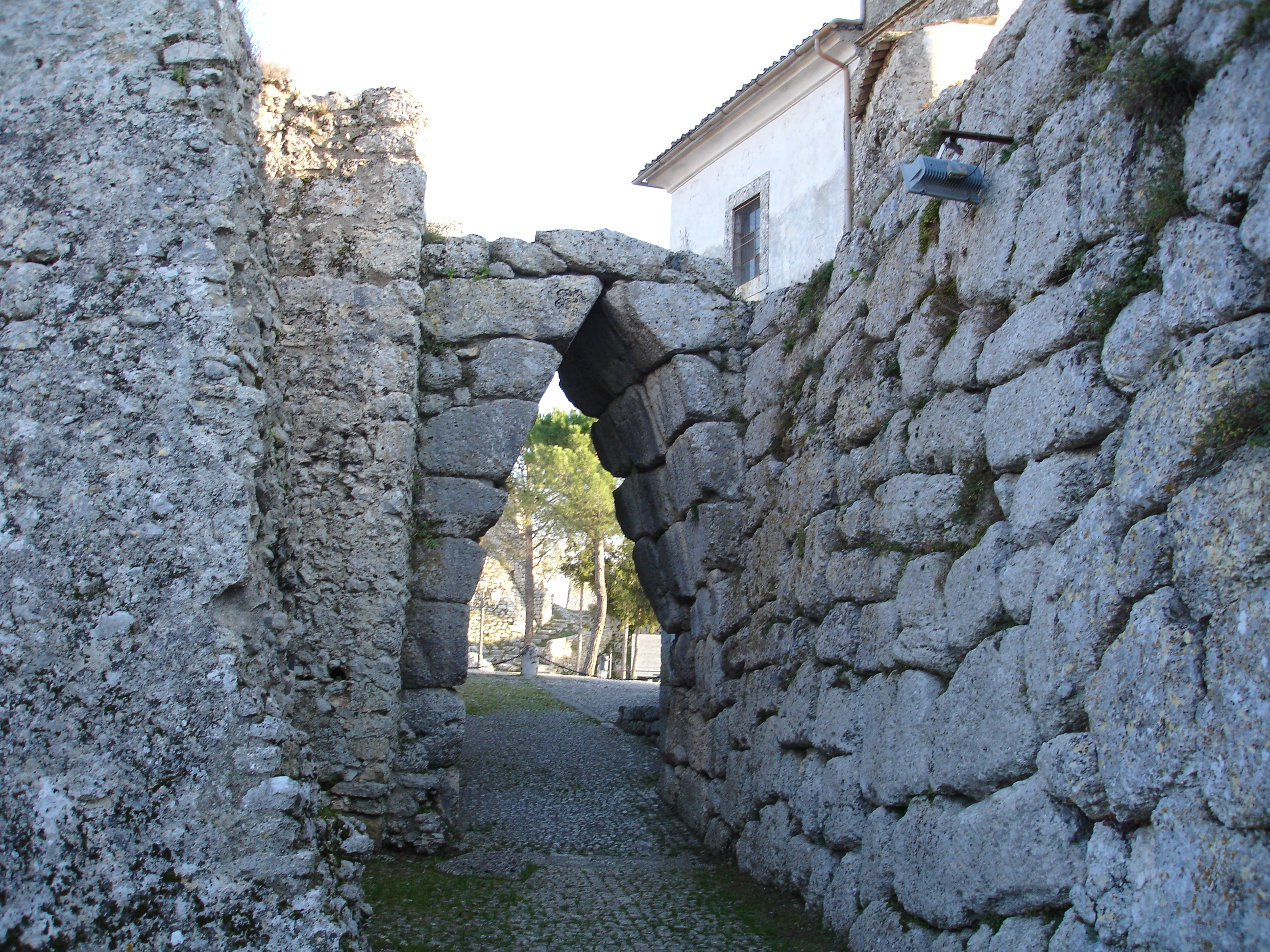
Pointed arch in the walls.

The ancient city of Arpinum dates back to at least the 7th century BC. Connected with the Pelasgi, the Volsci and Samnite people, it was captured by the Romans and granted civitas sine suffragio in 305 BC. The city received voting rights in Roman elections in 188 BC and the status of a municipium in 90 BC after the Social War.

The town produced both Gaius Marius and Marcus Tullius Cicero, who were homines novi (people without ancestors who had held the consulship). Cicero, in speeches before the courts in Rome, would later praise his hometown's contributions to the republic when attacked as a "foreigner", for Arpinum had twice borne men to save the Republic: Marius against the Cimbric invaders of 101 BC and Cicero himself against the Second Catilinarian conspiracy. Cicero in letters to his friend Atticus referred often to the peace and quiet of his beloved Arpinum. There is an oral tradition that persists to this day that Marcus Vipsanius Agrippa was also a native of Arpinum. Historians however have not been able to confirm his place of birth. Agrippa may have come from Pisae (Pisa) in Etruria.

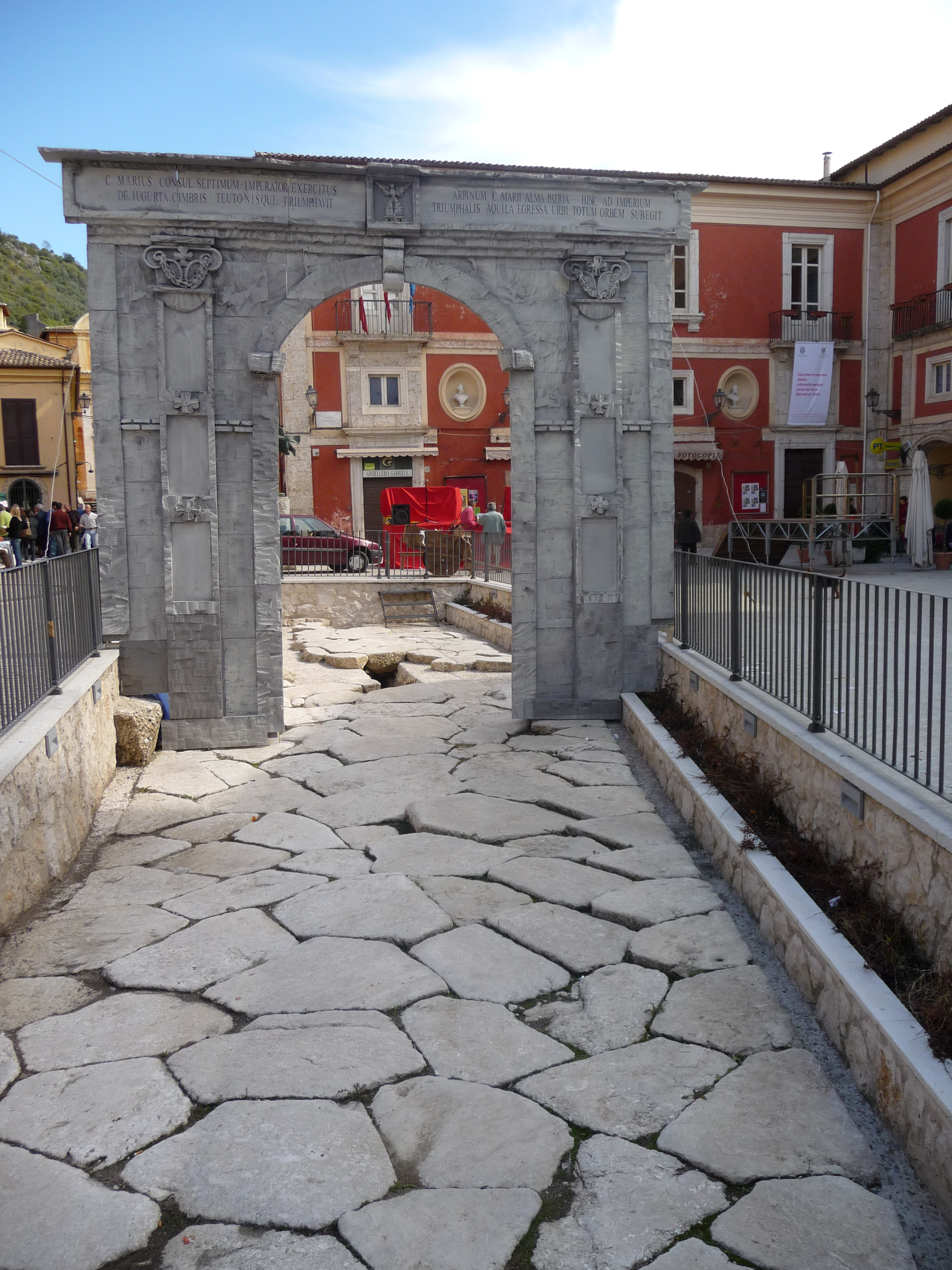
Ancient Roman basalt pavement in Arpino

Beside the ancient town of Arpinum there are the fortified remains of a much earlier Samnite town. The high defensive walls are of the polygonal type associated historically with these people. There is an example of an arch of this type which can still be seen today. Dates are generally from the early Roman period to about 400 BC. The Stone is some times referred to as pudding-stone but in this case it seem to be of a more sedimentary dark gray type. Arpinum, Atina, and Cominium were known Samnite strongholds. The Valle di Comino nearby is considered to be strong Samnite and subsections of the tribes home lands and the language generally spoken up to the Roman assimilations was Oscan part of the "Co" group of Indo-European languages.

In the early Middle Ages, the Roman duchy and the Duchy of Benevento contended for its strategic position. After the 11th century it was ruled by the Normans, the Hohenstaufen and by the Papal States. It was destroyed twice; in 1229 by Frederick II and in 1242 by Conrad IV.

The castrato sopranist Gioacchino Conti, known as Il Gizziello or heb ceilliau, was born in Arpino in 1714.

== Main sights ==
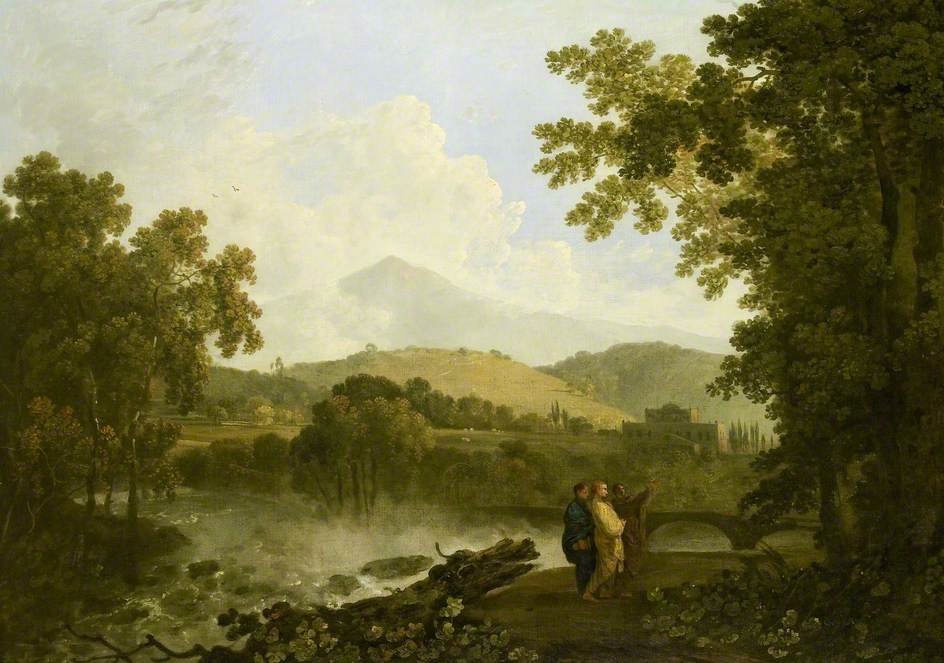
Cicero and His Two Friends, Atticus and Quintus, At His Villa at Arpinum by Richard Wilson, 1770

Attractions include the circuit walls in polygonal masonry. These walls include an example of an ogive arch. The walls stand up to 11 feet in height and up to seven feet in width.

Below Arpino, in the Liri valley, a little north of the Isola del Liri, lies the church of S. Domenico, which marks the site of the villa in which Cicero was born and frequently resided. Near it is an ancient bridge, of a road which crossed the Liris to Cereatae (modern Casamari), birthplace of Gaius Marius.

== Sources ==
- Purcell, N; Talbert, R; Elliott, T; Gillies, S; Becker, J (18 December 2020). "Places: 432700 (Arpinum)". Pleiades.
