= List of centenarians (miscellaneous) =

The following is a list of centenarians known for reasons other than their longevity. For more lists, see lists of centenarians.

All supercentenarians (above 110 years old)
Living

Name	Lifespan	Age	Reason for Notability
John Adams	1745–1849	104	American shoemaker, veteran of the American Revolution, and centenarian, who may be the earliest-born person to have been photographed alive although several other contenders are known (including Conrad Heyer, see below).
Edward Allcard	1914–2017	102	English marine surveyor
Loretta Alvarez	1892/1894–1996	102/104	Mexican-American Pascua Yaqui midwife
Carl Aschan	1906–2008	102	British spy
Eliza Jane Ashley	1917–2020	103	American chef
Ruth Bancroft	1908–2017	109	American landscape and garden designer
Elly Beinhorn	1907–2007	100	German pilot
Fred Birchmore	1911–2012	100	American adventurer, best known for his 1935 travels around the world on a bicycle
Blanche Blackwell	1912–2017	104	Jamaican heiress
Werner Braun	1918–2018	100	Israeli photographer
Helen Brockman	1902–2008	105	American fashion designer, author and professor
Sam Burston	1915–2015	100	Australian farmer
Ethel Bush	1916–2016	100	British police officer, recipient of the George Medal
Paco Cano	1912–2016	103	Spanish photojournalist
Cynthia Chalk	1913–2018	104	Canadian photographer
Pearl Laska Chamberlain	1909–2012	103	American pilot
Jim Charlton	1911–2013	102	Canadian coin dealer and numismatic publisher
Otis Clark	1903–2012	109	Hollywood butler and survivor of the Tulsa race massacre
Molly Clutton-Brock	1912–2013	101	British therapist and youth worker
Marthe Cohn	1920–2025	105	French author, spy and Holocaust survivor
Lady Ivy Cooke	1916–2017	100	Wife of the Governor-General of Jamaica
Paulette Coquatrix	1916–2018	102	French costume designer
Desideria Pasolini Dall'Onda	1920–2021	101	Italian gardener and conservationist
Glen Dawson	1912–2016	103	American rock climber and environmentalist
Cyril Demarne	1905–2007	101	British military firefighter
Max Desfor	1913–2018	104	American Pulitzer Prize-winning photographer
Luigi Caccia Dominioni	1913–2016	102	Italian architect and furniture designer
David Douglas Duncan	1916–2018	102	American photojournalist
Guy Eby	1918–2021	102	American airline captain
Mary Ellis	1917–2018	101	British ferry pilot
Albert Facchiano	1910–2011	101	American mobster
John Franzese	1917–2020	103	American mobster
Hans Gericke	1912–2014	101	German architect
Ann Hutchinson Guest	1918–2022	103	American-British dance notator
Conrad Heyer	1749/1753–1856	102 or 106	American farmer, veteran of the American Revolutionary War, and centenarian who is often credited as being the earliest-born person to have been photographed alive although several other contenders are known (including John Adams, see above).
Esther Hoffe	1906–2007	101	Czech-Israeli secretary and alleged mistress of Max Brod
Huang Mulan	1906–2017	110	Chinese spy
Evelyn Bryan Johnson	1909–2012	102	American pilot and flight instructor
Teresa Jungman	1907–2010	102	English socialite
Ata Kandó	1913–2017	103	Hungarian-born Dutch photographer
Thorleif Karlsen	1909–2010	100	Norwegian police inspector
Constance Kent	1844–1944	100	English criminal
Edith Kent	1908–2012	103	First British woman to be given equal pay
Thérèse Kleindienst	1916–2018	101	French librarian
Florence Knoll	1917–2019	101	American furniture designer
Eleanor Lambert	1903–2003	100	American fashion pioneer
Phyllis Latour	1921–2023	102	South African-born British spy and Legion of Honour recipient
Arthur Lessac	1909–2011	101	American voice trainer
Doris Lockness	1910–2017	106	American aviation pioneer
Victor A. Lundy	1923–2024	101	American modernist architect
Sir Denis Mahon	1910–2011	100	British art collector and historian
Elizabeth Holloway Marston	1893–1993	100	British-born American attorney and psychologist.
Karre Mastanamma	1911–2018	107	Indian internet chef
Roberta McCain	1912–2020	108	American socialite, heiress, and mother of John McCain
Elizabeth Peet McIntosh	1915–2015	100	American spy
Captain Sir Tom Moore	1920–2021	100	English army officer and COVID-19 fundraiser
Mikhail Mukasei	1907–2008	101	Russian spy
Eric P. Newman	1911–2017	106	American numismatist
Oei Hui-lan	1889–1992	103	Indonesian socialite, style icon, and second wife of Wellington Koo
Maria Pasquinelli	1913–2013	100	Italian assassin
John Penton	1925–2025	100	American professional motorcycle racer and businessman
Brunhilde Pomsel	1911–2017	106	German secretary and broadcaster
Stephanie Rader	1915–2016	100	American intelligence agent
Zus Ratulangi	1922–2025	102	Indonesian. Latest surviving member of Central Indonesian National Committee. Daughter of Sam Ratulangi
Jens Risom	1916–2016	100	Danish-born American furniture designer
Edward Rondthaler	1905–2009	104	American typographer
Dorothy Rungeling	1911–2018	106	Canadian pilot
Ed Russenholt	1890–1991	100	Canadian weatherman
Joseph W. Schmitt	1916–2017	101	American aircraft mechanic and spacesuit technician
Go Seigen	1914–2014	100	Chinese-Japanese Go player
Bernice Silver	1913–2020	106	American puppeteer
Babs Simpson	1913–2019	105	American fashion editor who worked at Vogue
Mollie Sneden	1709–1810	101	American ferry operator
Morton Sobell	1917–2018	101	American spy
Paula Stafford	1920–2022	102	Australian fashion designer
Tchan Fou-li	1916–2018	102	Hong Kong photographer
Terentia	98 BC–6 AD	103	Ancient Rome: wife of Cicero
Len Vale-Onslow	1900–2004	103	British motorcycle builder
Wang Da-hong	1917–2018	100	Chinese-born Taiwanese architect
W. P. Watkins	1893–1995	101	English co-operator and writer
Joseph Weil	1875–1976	100	American confidence man
Black Mike Winage	1870–1977	107	One of the original settlers in the Yukon during the Klondike Gold Rush
Michael Wright	1912–2018	105	Hong Kong architect
