= Partitiones Oratoriae =

Partitiones Oratoriae (also De Partitione Oratoria) is a rhetorical treatise, written by Cicero. According to the method of the Middle Academy, the treatise is sometimes described as a reverse catechism of rhetoric, for it is presented in the form of questions and answers. Cicero wrote it as a handbook for his young son, Marcus, and structured the text as a dialogue between the two of them.

== Date and composition ==
When exactly the text was composed is disputed. Some scholars date it to the end of 54 BCE, when Cicero's son and nephew Marcus and Quintus were children. It may have been composed as part of the children's education in rhetoric or as an accessible epitome of Cicero's other work around that time, De Oratore. However, other scholars date it as late as 46 BCE, around the time of the composition of De Divinatione.

Around 54 BCE, Cicero was extremely interested in his son Marcus' education, and he was not satisfied with the boy's teacher. He expressed interest in teaching Marcus himself. At this time, Marcus was eleven years of age; the simple structure of the treatise of questions and answers would have been very appropriate for this age. Cicero also relates in his letters at this earlier point that he is very interested in Marcus' education. The political events discussed in the work also suggest a terminus ante quem in the 50s BCE.

However, some scholars believe boys of this age were too young to be taught rhetoric. Thus, the treatise would have been written in 46 BCE – in line with the text's claim that it was written when Cicero was free to leave Rome, probably shortly after the death of his daughter Tullia, – just before then 19-year-old Marcus left for Athens to study rhetoric. By this time in his life (from the year 56 onwards), Cicero could no longer voice his political principles without the risk of exile. "He had lost his freedom of speech and speech was his life". If this late, Partitiones would be more of a philosophical work than one of pedagogy since, by this point, Cicero's son Marcus was studying philosophy in Athens with the rhetorician Cratippus of Pergamon.

The work itself is composed as a dialogue, where Cicero answers questions about rhetoric given by his son Marcus in a "catechism in reverse". It then is divided into three sections on the power or capabilities of an orator, the speech, and the question (Latin: vis oratoris, oratio, [et] quaestio). The philosophical basis of the rhetorical system is from the Middle Academy. Questions have been raised in modern times of its authenticity, but no such doubts are raised by ancient authors such as Quintilian.

== Summary of the text ==
The treatise begins when Cicero's son asks his father, "I wish...to hear the rules concerning the principles of speaking... Into how many parts is the whole system of speaking divided?"

His father replies, "Is there anything, my Cicero, which I can be more desirous of than that you should be as learned as possible?"

Cicero then undertakes a systematic discussion of eloquence. He says rhetoric is arranged under three headings – "first of all, the power of the orator; secondly, the speech; thirdly, the subject of the speech". The orator's power consists of ideas and words, which must be "discovered and arranged". "To discover" applies mostly to ideas and "to be eloquent" applies more to language. There are five "companions of eloquence" - "voice, gesture, expression of countenance,... action,... and memory". There are four parts of a speech: two of them explain a subject – "narration" and "confirmation;" two of them excite the minds of the hearers – "the opening" and "the peroration" (the conclusion). The narration and confirmation add credibility to the speech while the opening and conclusion should produce feelings.

He then goes on to say the "cause" or subject of a speech is "divided according to the divisions of hearers". There are three kinds of subjects: embellishment, aimed to give pleasure; judicial, aimed to either make a judge punish or forgive; and deliberation, aimed to persuade the assembly to either hope or fear (see Aristotle on rhetorical genre). Of these causes, Cicero goes deepest into judicial oratory, therefore emphasizing "the desirableness of maintaining the laws, and the danger with which all public and private affairs are threatened".

Cicero ends his treatise with a humanistic view of rhetoric that praises expansive education.

And without a knowledge of these most important arts how can an orator have either energy or variety in his discourse, so as to speak properly of things good or bad, just or unjust, useful or useless, honourable or base?

== Significance ==
The text may show the first sign of Cicero's mature view of rhetoric, later expanded in De Oratore. In De Inventione, Cicero had outlined a technical idea of rhetoric based on the handbooks of his era. But as he aged, his view changed to an "all-encompassing" ideal modeled on Philo's rhetorical teachings. Previous to and during Cicero's lifetime, there was a quarrel between rhetoricians and philosophers over whether rhetoric was restricted to only the forensic and technical sphere, or if it included the abstract and philosophical realm. "Specifically, Cicero suggest[s] ascending from the [restrictive] to the [general] in a speech".

This work thus merges rhetoric as a more simplistic, teachable art with the themes of De Oratore, praising the ideal orator who appreciates and utilizes expansive education and training.

== Bibliography ==
- Dyck, Andrew R (2025). Cicero: the man and his works. Cambridge University Press. doi:10.1017/9781316084342. ISBN 978-1-316-08434-2.
- Cicero: On the Orator: Book 3. Loeb Classical Library 349. Translated by Rackham, H. Cambridge, MA: Harvard University Press. 1942. ISBN 978-0-674-99384-6.
