= List of the earliest-born people to be photographed =

When photography became widespread in 1839, there were several centenarians and supercentenarians who had their photographs taken. The oldest subjected with a confirmed dated photograph was John Adams who was 100 when he was photographed in 1845. However, the oldest unconfirmed photograph was Caesar, who was either 113 or 114, which if confirmed would make him one of the oldest Americans to ever live.

Image	Name	Age when photographed	DOB	Description	Source
	Caesar	113-114 (?)	1737/40 (?)	Caesar was a slave who worked for 3 or 4 generations of the Nicoll family in New York. He retired in 1817, and was given his freedom in 1841.	
	John Owen	About 100 or over	April 16, 1735/1741 (?)	John Owen was a veteran of both the French and Indian War and the American Revolutionary War. Date of birth uncertain. Baptized on September 2, 1744.	
	John Adams	100	February 1, 1744 or 1745	John Adams was a shoemaker, veteran of the Revolutionary War and a widower. He was photographed in 1845 on his 100th birthday.	
	Hannah Stilley Gorby	94 (?)	1746 (?)	Hannah was born in 1746 to Swedish immigrants in Delaware. The subject of this photo is doubted to be her, and there is no evidence that Gorby lived into the age of photography.	
	Dr. Ezra Green	101	June 23, 1746	Dr. Green was a Harvard University alumnus, a surgeon during the American Revolutionary War, Member of the Constitutional Convention, and a deacon for a congregational church. His original photograph is lost but a pencil sketch was made of it after his death.	
	Baltus Stone	99	June 7, 1747	Baltus was a Revolutionary War veteran who fought at Battle of Long Island and married a Native American woman after the war.	
	Mary Munroe Sanderson	104	October 10, 1748	Mary was born in Lexington, to Scottish immigrants. In October of 1772, Mary married Samuel Sanderson who worked as a cabinetmaker and later a corporal in the Continental Army. During the war, Mary begrudgingly took care of a wounded British soldier who she discovered in her bed.	
	Margaret Moser	102	July 5, 1750	Originally known as Aunty Moser, she has since been identified as Margaret Moser. The photograph was taken when she was 102.	
	Samuel Sprague	89	December 22, 1753	Samuel was a mason, father of Charles Sprague, and took part in the Boston Tea Party in 1773 at the age of 19 and fought in the Revolutionary War and saw combat at the siege of Boston and fought at Trenton and Princeton.	
	Conrad Heyer	103	April 10, 1749/1753	Conrad Heyer was an American farmer, veteran of the American Revolutionary War, who allegedly took part in the crossing of the Delaware River. In 1852, he posed for a daguerreotype at the age of 103.	
	Dr. Joseph Souberbielle	91	March 18, 1754	Joseph Souberbielle was a French surgeon who served as chief surgeon for the victors of the Bastille (1789) and in 1793, he was a juror of the Revolutionary Tribunal. The photograph is believed to be of him or French doctor François-Victor Bally.	
	Samuel Hahnemann	86	April 10, 1755	Hahnemann was a German medical doctor and the creator of homeopathy, a pseudoscientific system of alternative medicine.	
	Martin Routh	99	September 18, 1755	Martin Routh was an English scholar and was President of Magdalen College, Oxford from 1791-1854.	
	Ralph Farnham	102	July 7, 1756	Ralph was a Revolutionary veteran who was supposed to participate in the Battle of Bunker Hill but arrived later due to an error in his colonel's orders.	
	Abraham Wheelwright	93	July 26, 1757	Captain Abraham Wheelwright was a soldier in the Revolutionary War who was present at the Battle of Trenton and later at Princeton, finally wintering at Morristown before his discharge in 1777.	
	Lemuel Cook	105	September 10, 1759	Lemuel was a farmer who fathered 10 children and fought at Brandywine and in the Virginian campaign, and was wounded several times. He was present at Charles Cornwallis' surrender in October 1781.	
	Daniel F. Bakeman	109	October 9, 1759	Daniel was a farmer, fathered 8 children, and was supposedly a veteran of the Revolutionary War and possibly fought at the Battle of Johnston.	
