= Publilia (wife of Cicero) =

1st-century BC Roman woman

Publilia (b. c. 62–60 BCE) was the ward and second wife of Roman orator and politician Marcus Tullius Cicero. They married in late 46 BCE, when she was 14 or 15, and Cicero was 60. They divorced shortly after the death of Cicero's daughter, Tullia, at some point between late May and early July of 45 BCE.

== Life ==
Mention of Publilia is relatively scarce in the source record, and what we know of her is reconstructed largely from Cicero's letters.

Her date of birth is unclear: Syme argues she could have been born no later than 60 BCE. Treggiari, meanwhile, places her birth in 62 BCE.

The exact date of her marriage to Cicero is unclear. Treggiary argues it would have been in late 46 BCE, whilst Claasen suggests it was instead in late 47 or early 46 BCE. Ancient sources suggest that Cicero married her in order to pay off the debts he had incurred with her wealth. There are also accusations in these sources that he married her because he was infatuated with her beauty. Modern scholars posit that her family may have had advantageous political connections as well. Whatever the reason for the marriage, it is near-certain that it was not the cause of Cicero's divorce from Terentia, his first wife.

It was an unhappy marriage in which Cicero's mistreatment of her was considered scandalous. Publilia's own behaviour is difficult to reconstruct due to the paucity of evidence, but it is known that she wrote to her husband to ask permission to join him when they had been apart for a month, displaying her willingless to act properly as his wife. They swiftly divorced in mid 45 BCE, following accusations from Cicero that she was pleased at the death of his daughter Tullia.

It is somewhat unclear whom she later married. Jerome mentions that a wife of Cicero married Gaius Sallustius Crispus and then Messalla Corvinus. Following this, Treggiari argues that it is credible for Publilia to have married Sallust: they could have married late in 45 BCE, or in May of 44 BCE. The marriage to Messalla is somewhat less certain, but still plausible. She was almost certainly married to Gaius Vibius Rufus, suffect consul of 16 CE. This marriage is supported by epigraphic evidence attesting to the existence of M. Publilius Strato, freedman of Publilia and C. Vibius Rufus; for his to have been the freedman of both, they would likely have had to be married.
