= Ethel Bush =

British police officer

Ethel Violet Bush GM (10 March 1916 – 18 May 2016) was a British police officer who was one of the two first Metropolitan Women Police awarded a George Medal.

Bush joined the Metropolitan Police as a Constable in 1946 after service with the Women's Auxiliary Air Force during World War II, and was promoted to Sergeant in 1953.

During 1955, after several women had been attacked in Fairfield Path, Croydon, Sergeant Bush volunteered to act as a decoy, along with many of her colleagues. The assailant had seriously injured WPC Kathleen Parrott in March, and on 23 April approached Bush from behind and hit her over the head, making a wound that required eleven stitches. Bush held on to her attacker's coat and tried to hold him, but fell resulting in his escape.

When the attacker was eventually caught, WPC Parrott and WPS Bush were among nine women who were able to identify the 29-year-old labourer. In response to her actions, a Judge stated "I can not imagine higher courage than you showed along that footpath." A Chief magistrate added, "If anyone can imagine a finer story in the history of the Metropolitan Police, I shall be pleased to hear it." Bush received the George Medal; also a Commissioner's High Commendation and £15 from Bow Street Police Fund.

== Last years ==
Bush celebrated her 100th birthday in March 2016 and died two months later.
