= Caesar (enslaved man) =

Subject of early photograph (1737–1852)

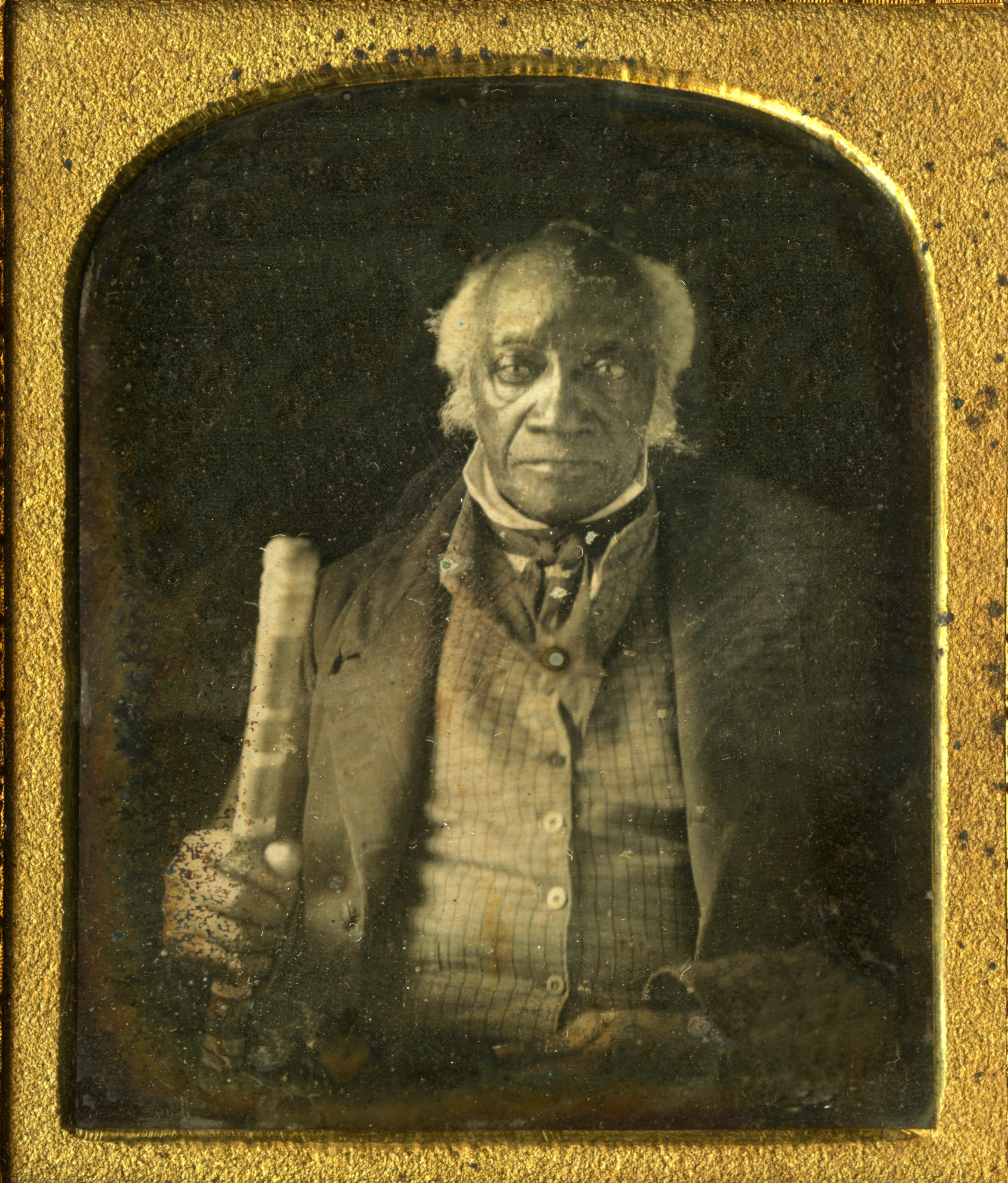
- An 1851 daguerreotype
- Born: c. 1737 (supposedly); Bethlehem House estate, New York, Thirteen Colonies
- Died: 1852 (aged 114–115); New York, U.S.
- Other names: Cesar Nicholls, Cesar Prince, Cesar Wood
- Known for: Candidate for being the earliest-born person ever photographed while alive and for being the last slave to be manumitted in New York.

Caesar (c. 1737 (supposedly) – 1852) was a slave who is notable for possibly being the earliest-born person ever photographed while alive, when his daguerreotype was taken in 1851. He was also the last slave to be manumitted in New York. Within his lifetime, Caesar had outlived at least three generations of masters on the Nicoll estate in Bethlehem.

== Biography ==
=== Early Life ===
Caesar was born on the property of Rensselaer Nicoll (1706–1776), who owned the Bethlehem House property in Bethlehem, New York. His birthdate is supposedly 1737, but the 1850 New York Census documents Caesar as being 110 years old which would place his birthdate somewhere around 1740.

An article about Caesar's life in 1925 titled "A Notable Example of Longevity", which borrows heavily from Dunkin Sill's 1924 typescript "Biography of a Slave", provides an account of Caesar's first years with the Nicoll family:

In 1737, a year after Rensselaer Nicoll and his bride were settled in their new home, a boy was born to two of their slaves, and named Caesar. He was a year older than his master's eldest son, Francis. The boy, Caesar, in his early years was first a playmate of his master's children and later a willing and delighted follower of his young master Francis when the two boys became old enough to go on hunting and fishing trips...

=== Adult life ===
According to the 1850 Census, Caesar never learned to read or write. He was allowed to retire in 1817 at the age of 80 and lived with the Nicoll family for the remainder of his life. Although most enslaved people in New York were freed by July 4, 1827, he was not officially manumitted until around 1841, when all forms of slavery were banned in New York. Caesar had children, grandchildren, and great-grandchildren in his lifetime.

In 1849, the artist G. W. Woodward had a sketch of Caesar drawn as he sat dozing in a chair which can be viewed at the Cedar Hill Schoolhouse in Bethlehem. In 1851, his final master's son persuaded Caesar to sit for a daguerreotype portrait, one of the earliest photographic images of an African in the United States. The 1/6th plate daguerreotype later became known as Daguerreotype of Caesar: A survivor. A note included with the portrait reads: "Ceasar [sic], born a slave of Van R. Nicoll, son of William, in 1737 at Bethlehem, N.Y., where he died in 1852. The last slave to die in the North. This daguerreotype was taken in 1851. His 2nd master was Francis Nicoll, son of Van R. Nicoll and his 3rd master Wm. Nicoll Sill, grandson of Francis who left all to his wife Margaret Sill"

Caesar is documented as "Cesar Nichols" on line 8 of the 1850 United States Census

Caesar died in 1852, aged 115, according to the inscription on his grave marker in the Nicoll-Sill family burial ground in Bethlehem. However, the current gravestone was placed in 1976 and is not original from the time of his death.

=== Longevity Claims ===
Currently, no contemporary evidence that can verify his age has been found; not even his year of death is certain. The only evidence from Caesar's lifetime documenting his age is the 1850 census, which lists him as 110-year-old "Cesar Nicholls". However, if his recorded age is correct, he would not only be one of the earliest-born people ever photographed (surpassing Conrad Heyer, John Adams and other such claimants), he would be one of the longest-lived people in the history of the United States.

=== Grave marker ===
According to an account by Dunkin Sill, a descendant of Caesar's former masters, Caesar was buried in the Nicoll-Sill Burying Ground but his original headstone was stolen. He wrote, "Since publication of my article on our old slave, Caesar, some vandals stole his headstone. He was buried in this graveyard. His headstone was still in place in May, 1923; but when I later visited the old place it had been removed." A group of students from Hamagrael Elementary School visited the cemetery in November of 1975 and were so impressed by Caesar's story and the theft of his grave marker that they pooled their allowances, held bake sales, and requested financial support from the town supervisor to have a replacement grave marker erected. On May 24, 1976 the school children gathered in the cemetery to commemorate Caesar with the new stone which was placed next to his first master, Rensselaer Nicoll.

=== The last slave manumitted in New York ===
Claims that Caesar was the last slave to be manumitted in New York seem to stem from Dunkin Sill's 1924 typescript "Biography of a Slave". Although there were two slaves reportedly living in Albany County after the 1830 census, Caesar would have been freed along with thousands of others on July 4, 1827 following the passage of the 1817 "Act Relative to Slaves and Servants".
