= John Owen (centenarian) =

American centenarian (1735–1843)

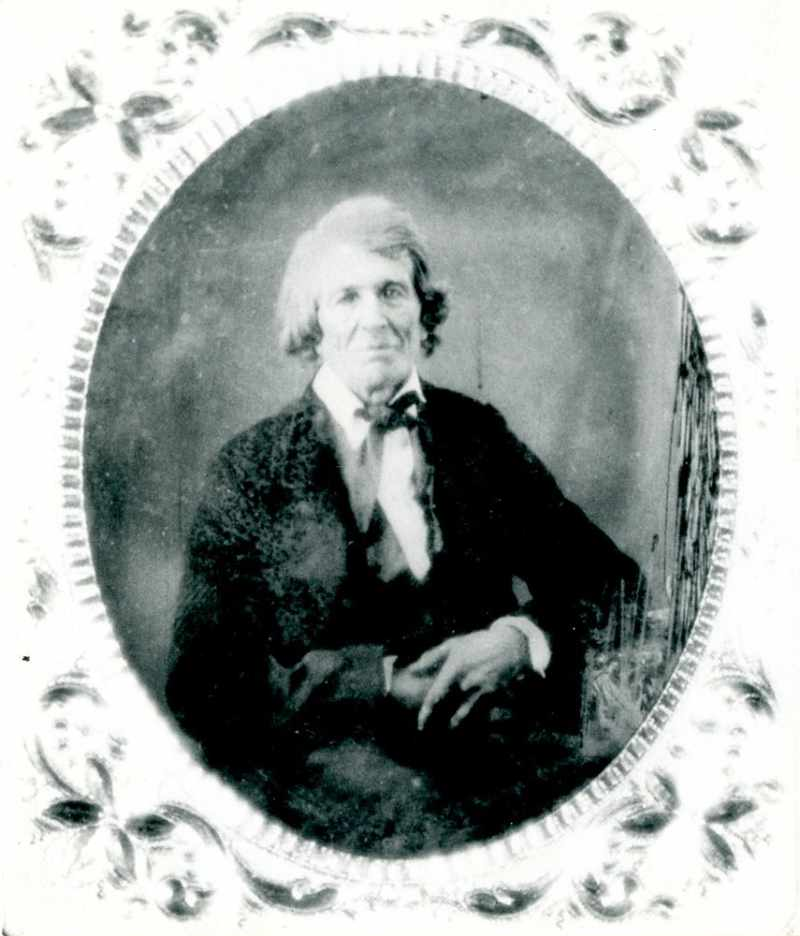
- Around 1843
- Born: c. 1741; Salisbury, Connecticut, Thirteen Colonies, British America
- Died: February 24, 1843; New York, U.S.
- Other name: John Owens
- Known for: One of the earliest born humans to be photographed, possibly one of the last veterans of the French and Indian War.

John Owen (c. 1741 – February 24, 1843) was an American centenarian and veteran from Salisbury, Connecticut. Owen served in both the French and Indian War and the Revolutionary War. He may have been the last living veteran of the French and Indian War.

== Biography ==
Owen's gravestone claims he was born on April 16, 1735, in Salisbury, Litchfield County, Connecticut Colony, to Aaron Owen and Miriam Wright. Other evidence puts his birth date in 1741 and he was baptised in 1744. He is known to have served in both the French and Indian War and the American Revolutionary War, in which he apparently served under Captain Nathaniel Buel. Owen was photographed soon before his death, making him the earliest-born person with a confirmed date of birth to be photographed.

== Family ==
Owen, through his daughter Elsey, is the maternal grandfather of Reuben Fenton, the 22nd Governor of New York.
