= Edith Kent =

British electrical welder (1908–2012)

- Born: Edith Lillie Williams; 24 November 1908; Plymouth, Devon, England
- Died: 24 August 2012 (aged 103); Plymouth, Devon, England
- Other names: Edith Lillie Carter
- Occupation: Electrical welder
- Years active: 1941–1945
- Employer: Devonport Dockyard
- Known for: The first woman in Great Britain to be given equal pay
- Spouses: Joseph Carter (m. 1930; died 1946) Bill Kent (m. 1946; died 1996)
- Children: 1
- Relatives: Minna Algate (sister) Janet Lloyd (Great niece)

Edith Lillie Kent (née Williams, formerly Carter; 24 November 1908 – 24 August 2012) was a British electrical welder from Plymouth, England, during World War II. She was known was the first woman in Great Britain to be given equal pay.

== Early life ==
Edith Lillie Williams was born in Plymouth, Devon, England on 24 November 1908, as the seventh child to Charles Henry Williams, a painter and decorator, and his wife, Charlotte Ellen (née Smith), a housewife. She had eight siblings, including Minna Ellen Algate.

== Career ==
Kent took a job as a welder at Devonport Dockyard in Plymouth, Devon, in 1941, where she was paid £5 6s a week. She became the first woman to be employed at the dockyard. She had the advantage of being only 4 ft 11 in (1.50 m) tall, meaning that she was small enough to weld in places her male colleagues could not such as torpedo tubes.

Kent returned to work soon after she gave birth in 1942, however, leaving her daughter in the care of one of her five sisters. In 1943, she was given a pay rise, earning £6 6s. This was a higher wage than the average for a male manual worker, which was £5 8s 6d.

Kent left her job when the male workforce return from the front after the Second World War had finished in 1945. She took up a new job as a barmaid.

Kent herself had said that she was embarrassed at the time of her achievement, stating: "I got the job because my brothers worked at the dockyard and they thought I would be good at it. I was the first woman to work as a welder there. It made me a bit uncomfortable that I was the first woman to earn the same as the men — and in some cases I was earning more than them. All the men I worked with were marvellous and they didn't seem to mind me earning the same. None of them ever dared say it, but I think they knew I was worth as much as them, if not more,".

== Personal life ==
Kent married her first husband, Joseph Carter, in Plymouth, Devon, in April 1930. Their only child, a daughter, Jean E Carter, was born in Plymouth in April 1942. She was widowed in March 1946, after 16 years of marriage. The following month, she married her second husband, Charles Henry "Bill" Kent, who ran a shoe repair business in Plymouth. She was widowed in April 1996, after five decades of marriage.

=== Later years ===
Kent celebrated her 100th birthday in November 2008, becoming a centenarian. She marked the occasion with a tea dance at a hotel alongside fifty members of her family and friends, including her then-103-year-old sister, Minna, who died at Meadowside St Francis Care Centre in Plympton on 13 May 2010, aged 106.

Kent was photographed at her home in Plymouth in November 2009, aged 101, by the photographer Anita Corbin. The portrait hangs in the "100 First Women" section of the Brighton Museum & Art Gallery in Brighton and Hove.

=== Death ===
Kent died at her home in Plymouth on 24 August 2012. She was 103.

== Legacy ==
Kent's portrait was exhibited at the Royal Albert Memorial Museum in Devon in October 2022.

== See also ==
- List of centenarians (miscellaneous)
