= Cratippus of Pergamon =

Ancient Greek philosopher

Cratippus of Pergamon (Ancient Greek: Κράτιππος), was a leading Peripatetic philosopher of the 1st century BC who taught at Mytilene and Athens. The only aspects of his teachings which are known to us are what Cicero records concerning divination.

== Life ==
Cratippus was a contemporary and friend of Cicero who had a very high opinion of him, for he declared Cratippus to be the most distinguished of the Peripatetics that he had known, and thought him at least equal to the greatest of his school. Cratippus lived for a time at Mytilene, and accompanied Pompey in his flight after the Battle of Pharsalia, endeavouring to comfort and rouse him by philosophical arguments. Several eminent Romans, such as M. Marcellus and Cicero himself, were taught by him, and in 44 BC Cicero's son was his pupil at Athens, and was tenderly attached to him. Young Cicero seems also to have visited Asia in his company. When Julius Caesar was at the head of the Roman republic, Cicero obtained from him Roman citizenship for Cratippus, and also induced the council of the Areopagus at Athens to invite the philosopher to remain in the city and to continue his instructions in philosophy. Although Cicero speaks of him as the leading philosopher of the Peripatetic school, it is not certain if he was the scholarch. After the murder of Caesar, Brutus, while staying at Athens, also attended the lectures of Cratippus.

== Teachings ==
Although Cicero had a high opinion of the knowledge and talent of Cratippus, his philosophical opinions are unknown, apart from allusions to his opinions on divination, on which he seems to have written a work. Cicero states that Cratippus believed in dreams and supernatural inspiration (Latin: furor) but that he rejected all other kinds of divination. He seems to have held that, while motion, sense and appetite cannot exist apart from the body, thought reaches its greatest power when most free from bodily influence, and that divination is due to the direct action of the divine mind on that part of the human soul which is not dependent on the body.
