= Bethlehem House =

Historic house in New York, United States

- U.S. National Register of Historic Places
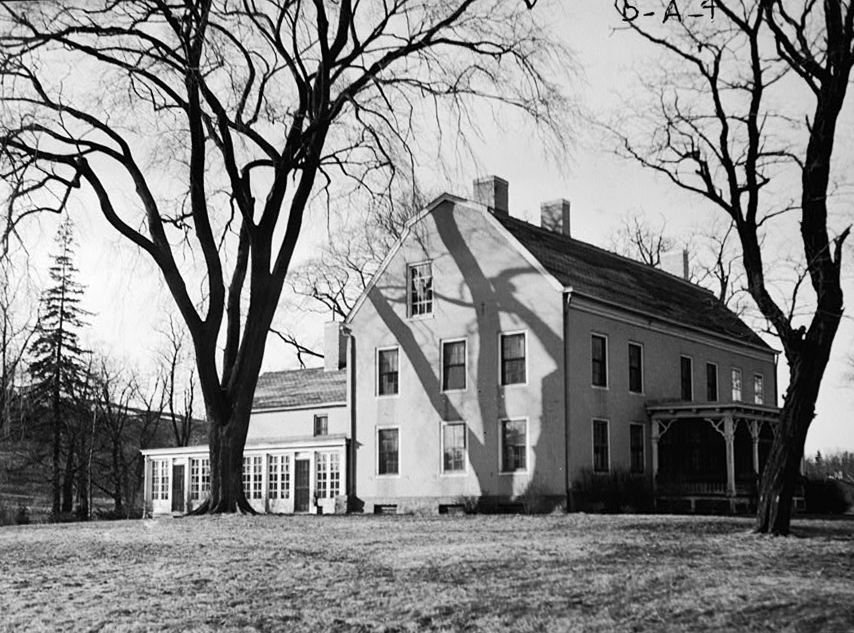
- Bethlehem House in 1934

- Location within New York Location within the United States
- Nearest city: Bethlehem, New York
- Coordinates: 42°32′38″N 73°46′0″W
- Area: 6.8 acres (2.8 ha)
- Built: 1735
- NRHP reference No.: 73001158
- Added to NRHP: April 11, 1973

Bethlehem House, also known as the Rensselaer Nicoll House, is a historic home located on Dinmore Road in Bethlehem, Albany County, New York. It was originally built about 1735 and expanded in 1796, 1810 (kitchen wing), and 1830 (tea room and office). It is two and one half stories high with two and one story additions in the rear. It is constructed of brick with a gambrel roof and three chimneys. It features a one-story Victorian-era entrance porch.

It was listed on the National Register of Historic Places in 1973.
