= Tullia (daughter of Cicero) =

Daughter of Cicero

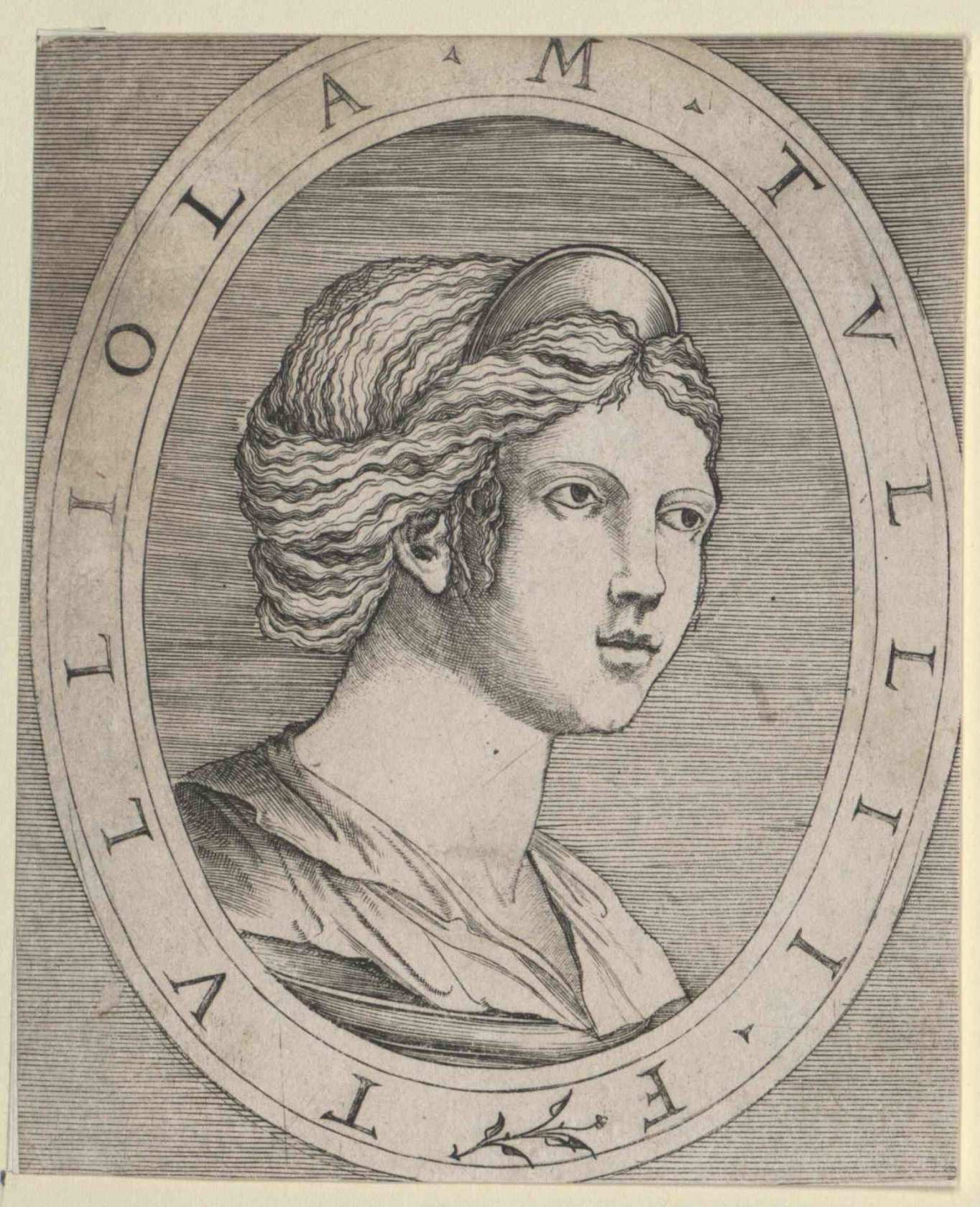
- Born: c. 79 BC
- Died: February 45 BC (aged c. 34)
- Spouses: Gaius Calpurnius Piso Frugi; (c. 63 – 57 BC); Furius Crassipes; (m. 56 BC; div. 51 BC); Publius Cornelius Dolabella; (m. 50 BC; div. 46 BC)
- Children: Two sons
- Parent(s): Marcus Cicero; Terentia

Tullia (c. 79 BC – February 45 BC), sometimes referred to affectionately as Tulliola ("little Tullia"), was the first child and only daughter of Roman orator and politician Marcus Tullius Cicero, by his first marriage to Terentia. She was the sister of Marcus Tullius Cicero Minor, born in 65 BC, who became suffect consul in 30 BC.

== Life ==
What is known of Tullia's life is from Plutarch's account of Cicero and the letters that Cicero wrote to others, particularly to her mother, and to his friend, the eques Titus Pomponius Atticus.

In 66 BC, Tullia was betrothed to Gaius Calpurnius Piso Frugi. They were married in 63, when Tullia was fifteen or sixteen, and Piso not much older. He embarked on the cursus honorum, the course of a Roman political career, serving as quaestor in 58, but he died the following year. In 56, Tullia married Furius Crassipes. By all accounts, they had a happy marriage, but nonetheless divorced in 51, for reasons that remain obscure.

During Caesar's civil war, Tullia visited her father at Brundisium. Cicero is said to have complained that Terentia failed to provide their daughter a proper escort, or sufficient money for her expenses.

In the summer of 50 BC, Tullia married Publius Cornelius Dolabella. Her father had not consented to the match, and instead wished for her to marry Tiberius Claudius Nero. However, Tullia and her mother Terentia had selected Dolabella to be Tullia's next husband while Cicero was away from Rome governing the province of Cilicia. Tullia and Dolabella were married even before Cicero returned to Rome. The pair had two sons but their marriage was not a happy one. The first boy was born May 19, 49 BC, and died the same year. Tullia divorced Dolabella in November 46, during her second pregnancy. She died in February 45, one month after giving birth to her second son (who survived, but would die soon after Tullia's death). Tullia died at Cicero's villa in Tusculum. Cicero's friends and colleagues wrote letters of condolence to the grief-stricken orator; some of these have survived. His second wife, Publilia, showed little sympathy; Publilia had always been jealous of the attention her husband lavished on his daughter and was in fact much younger than Tullia herself. Consequently, Cicero divorced Publilia.

== Legend of the perpetual lamp ==
In the fifteenth century, a tomb discovered at Rome was identified as Tullia's burial place. Reports of the discovery claimed that the corpse inside looked and felt like it had been buried that very day, and a lamp that the discoverers supposed to have been burning perpetually since Tullia's burial, more than fifteen hundred years earlier. The seventeenth-century English poet John Donne alludes to this legend in the eleventh stanza ("The Good-Night") of his "Epithalamion, 1613. Decemb. 26", composed for the marriage of the Earl of Somerset and Frances Howard:

Now, as in Tullias tombe, one lamp burnt cleare,
Unchang'd for fifteene hundred yeare,
May these love-lamps we here enshrine,
In warmth, light, lasting, equall the divine...

== Sources ==
- Browne, Thomas. Pseudodoxia epidemica: or, Enquiries into very many received tenants, and commonly presumed truths ["Vulgar Errors"], Book III, ch. 21. 1662. In The Works of Sir Thomas Browne, ed. Charles Sayle. 3 vols. Edinburgh: John Grant, 1927. An online text may be found through Luminarium.org. Note that Browne refers in his work to Tullia as the sister of Cicero, rather than as his daughter.
- Donne, John. The Poems of John Donne: edited from the Old Editions and Numerous Manuscripts with Introductions & Commentary by Herbert J. C. Grierson, M.A. 2 vols. Oxford: Clarendon Press, 1912. The complete "Eclogue" in modern English may be found at Luminarium.org
- Lemprière, John. "Tulliola or Tullia". A Classical Dictionary: Containing a copious account of all proper names mentioned in ancient authors... [Bibliotheca Classica] . 3rd American Edition. Philadelphia: J. Crissy, 1822.
- Lucius Mestrius Plutarchus (Plutarch), "The Life of Cicero", at LacusCurtius, from Lives of the Noble Greeks and Romans (Parallel Lives), Bernadotte Perrin (translator, Loeb Classical Library), Heinemann, London (1919), annotated by William P. Thayer, University of Chicago (2012).
