= Conrad Heyer =

18th-century American soldier and centenarian

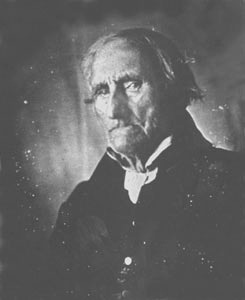
- Heyer, c. 1852 daguerreotype
- Born: April 10, 1749 or 1753 (Note: Although Heyer's date of birth is generally given as April 10, 1749, documents prior to 1850 state that he was born around 1753. According to some sources, Heyer's parents arrived in Broad Bay in October 1752, further supporting a birth year of 1753.) near Waldoboro, Massachusetts Bay
- Died: February 19, 1856 (aged 102 or 106); Waldoboro, Maine, United States
- Burial place: German Church and Cemetery
- Spouse: Mary Weber (m. 1776; died 1841)
- Children: 10
- Military career
- Allegiance: United States
- Branch: Continental Army
- Service years: 1775–1776
- Unit: 25th Continental Regiment
- Wars: American Revolutionary War

Conrad Heyer (April 10, 1749 or 1753 – February 19, 1856) was an American farmer, veteran of the American Revolutionary War, and centenarian. He is often credited as being the earliest-born person to have been photographed alive, although several other contenders are known, most notably a shoemaker named John Adams and an American slave named Caesar.

== Biography ==
Heyer was born in the village of Waldoboro in what was later to become the state of Maine – it was then known as "Broad Bay" and was part of the Province of Massachusetts Bay. The settlement had been sacked and depopulated by Wabanaki attacks and resettled with German immigrants recruited from the Rhineland. Among these settlers were the parents of Conrad Heyer, who also may have been the first white child born in the settlement. His father died the winter before he was born. His mother, Catharina, remarried in 1772/1773 to a German immigrant. In his youth, Heyer was a member of the German Lutheran Church.

During the American Revolution, Heyer fought for the Continental Army in the 25th Regiment, according to his pension filed in 1819 and several witnesses. He enlisted in December 1775 and was honorably discharged a year later, in mid-December 1776 at Fishkill. There is no historical record of any other service in the army. Later claims, such as that Heyer participated in Washington's famous crossing of the Delaware in December 1776 or served in the Army until 1778, cannot be confirmed.

Heyer married Mary Weber in 1776, with whom he had ten children. After the war, he returned to Waldoboro, where he made a living as a farmer until his death in 1856. He was buried with full military honors.

Around 1852, at the claimed age of 103, Heyer posed for a daguerreotype portrait. He is often credited as the earliest-born person known to have been photographed alive, although several other contenders exist. These include a woman named Mary Munroe Sanderson (1748–1852); Dr. Ezra Green (1746–1847); a shoemaker named John Adams (1745–1849); a Revolutionary war veteran named Baltus Stone, born sometime between 1743 and 1754; John Owen, said to have been born in 1735 or 1741 and an enslaved man named Caesar who, according to the inscription on his marble tombstone, was born in 1737 and died in 1852 — which would mean he lived to be 114–115 years old.

== See also ==
- List of the earliest people to be photographed
