= Cicero =

Roman statesman and lawyer (106–43 BC)

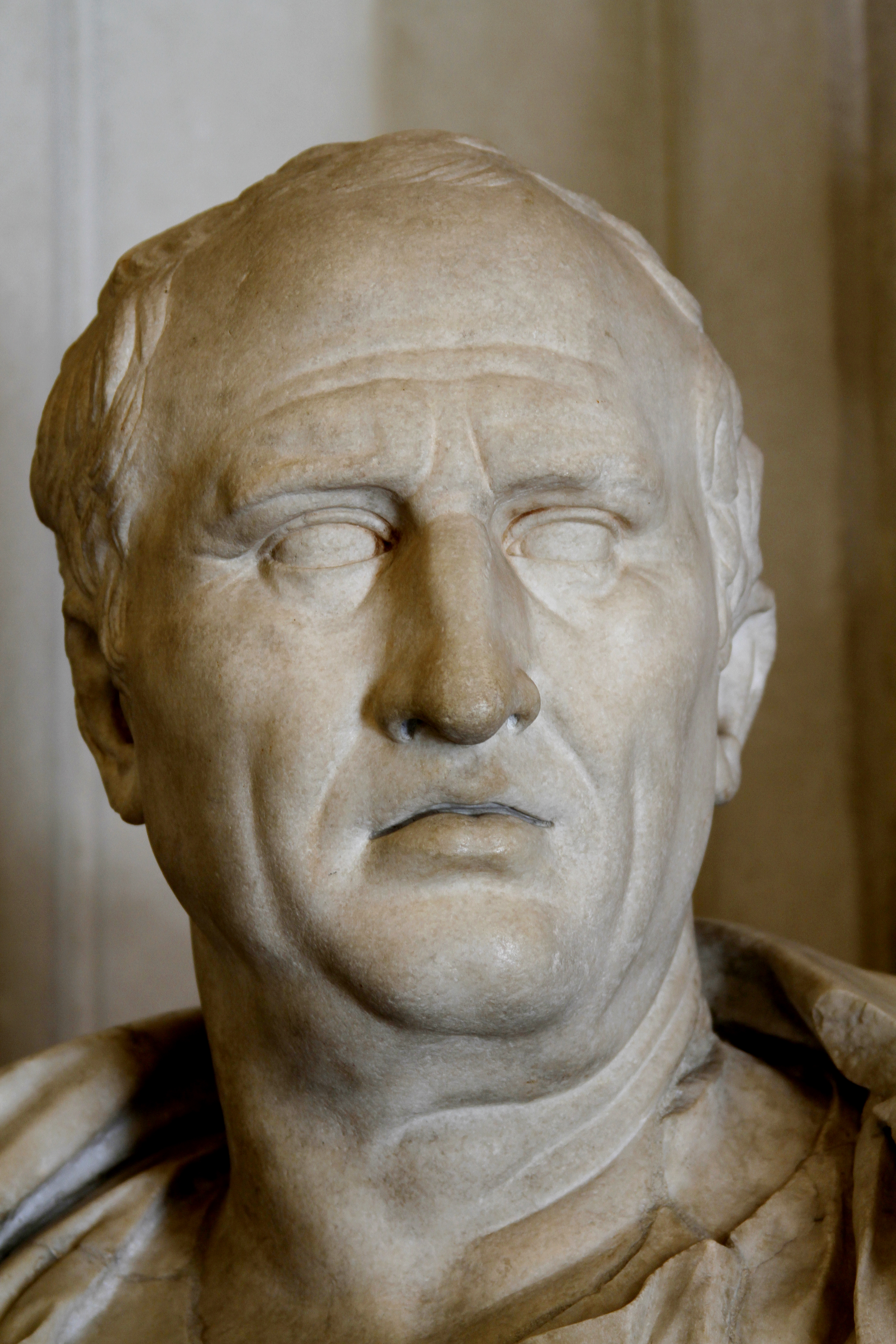
- First-century AD portrait of Cicero in the Capitoline Museums, Rome
- Born: 3 January 106 BC; Arpinum, Roman Republic
- Died: 7 December 43 BC (aged 63); Formiae, Roman Republic
- Cause of death: Assassination (by order of Mark Antony)
- Occupations: Statesman, lawyer, writer, orator
- Office: Quaestor (Sicily) (75 BC); Aedile (69 BC); Praetor (66 BC); Consul (63 BC); Legate under Pompey (57 BC); Proconsul (Cilicia) (51–50 BC); Proconsul (Greece and Italy) (49–47 BC)
- Spouses: Terentia (79–51 BC); Publilia (46–45 BC)
- Children: Tullia and Cicero Minor
- Relatives: Quintus Tullius Cicero (brother)

Philosophical work
- Era: Hellenistic philosophy
- Region: Western philosophy
- School: Academic skepticism; Classical republicanism; Eclecticism
- Main interests: Politics; law; rhetoric; theology; ethics; epistemology
- Notable works: Orations: In Verrem; In Catilinam I–IV; Philosophical works: Academica; De Oratore; De re publica; De Natura Deorum; De Officiis; Tusculanae Quaestiones; De Divinatione; De Fato
- Notable ideas: Exceptio probat regulam in casibus non exceptis; Humanitas; Inter arma enim silent leges; Non nobis solum; O tempora, o mores!; Salus populi suprema lex esto; Summum bonum

Notes
- Magistracies and years thereof from Broughton 1952, p. 627

Marcus Tullius Cicero (Note: The nomen is infrequently anglicized as Tully, (pronounced /ˈtʌli/ TUL-ee), while in Italian it is rendered as Tullio.) (/ˈsɪsəroʊ/ SISS-ər-oh, Classical Latin: [ˈmaːrkʊs ˈtʊlli.ʊs ˈkɪkɛroː]; 3 January 106 BC – 7 December 43 BC) was a Roman statesman, lawyer, scholar, philosopher, orator, and writer who tried to uphold optimate principles during the political crises of the Roman Republic that led to the establishment of the Roman Empire. The extensive writings of Cicero include treatises on rhetoric, philosophy, and politics. He is considered one of Rome's greatest orators and prose stylists and the innovator of what became known as "Ciceronian rhetoric". Cicero was educated in Rome and in Greece. He came from a wealthy municipal (municipium) family of the Roman equestrian order, and served as consul in 63 BC.

Cicero greatly influenced both ancient and modern reception of the Latin language. A substantial percentage of his work has survived, and he was admired by ancient and modern authors alike. He adapted the arguments of the chief schools of Hellenistic philosophy in Latin and coined a large portion of Latin philosophical vocabulary via lexical innovation (e.g. neologisms such as evidentia, generator, humanitas, infinitio, qualitas, and quantitas), almost 150 of which were the result of translating Greek philosophical terms.

Although he was an accomplished orator and successful lawyer, Cicero believed his political career was his most important achievement. During his consulship in 63 BC, he suppressed the Catilinarian conspiracy; however, because he had summarily and controversially executed five of the conspirators without trial, he was exiled in 58 but recalled the next year. Spending much of the 50s unhappy with the state of Roman politics, he took a governorship in Cilicia in 51 and returned to Italy on the eve of Caesar's civil war. Supporting Pompey during the war, Cicero was pardoned after Caesar's victory. After the assassination of Caesar in 44 BC, he led the Roman Senate against Mark Antony, attacking him in a series of speeches (Philippicae). He elevated Caesar's heir Octavian to rally support against Antony in the ensuing violent conflict (War of Mutina); however, after Octavian and Antony reconciled to form the Second Triumvirate (with Lepidus), Cicero was proscribed and executed in late 43 BC while attempting to escape Italy for safety. His severed hands and head were then displayed on the Rostra. Cicero's hands and head were taken by order of Antony and displayed to represent the repercussions of his anti-Antonian actions (notably his Philippicae) as a writer and as an orator respectively.

Petrarch's rediscovery of Cicero's letters is often credited for initiating the 14th-century Renaissance in public affairs (res publica), humanism, and classical Roman culture. According to Polish historian Tadeusz Zieliński, "the Renaissance was above all things a revival of Cicero, and only after him and through him of the rest of Classical antiquity." The peak of Cicero's authority and prestige came during the 18th-century Enlightenment. His impact on leading Enlightenment thinkers and political theorists, such as John Locke, David Hume, Montesquieu, and Edmund Burke, was substantial. His works rank among the most influential in global culture, and today still constitute one of the most important bodies of primary material for the writing and revision of Roman history, especially the last days of the Roman Republic.

== Early life ==
=== Family ===
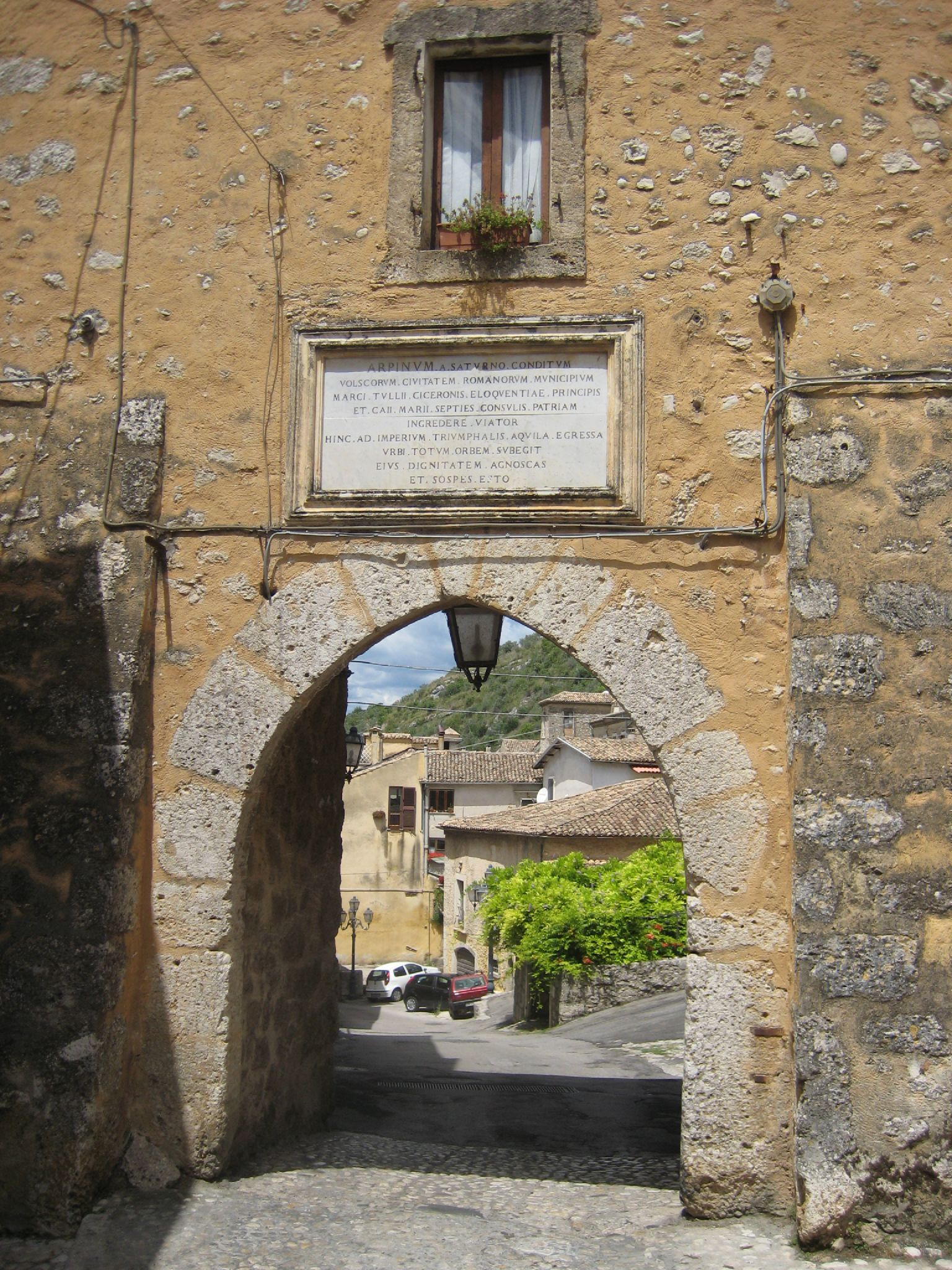
Arpino, Italy, birthplace of Cicero

Marcus Tullius Cicero was born on 3 January 106 BC in Arpinum, a hill town 100 kilometers (62 mi) southeast of Rome. He belonged to the Roman tribe (tribus) Cornelia. His father was a wealthy member of the equestrian order and possessed good connections in Rome; however, not being of robust health (he experienced poor digestion and inflammation of the eyes), he could not enter public life and studied extensively to compensate. Little is known about Cicero's mother Helvia, although Cicero's brother Quintus wrote in a letter that she was a thrifty housewife.

Cicero's cognomen, a hereditary nickname, comes from the Latin for chickpea (cicer). Plutarch explains that the name was originally given to one of Cicero's ancestors who had a cleft in the tip of his nose resembling a chickpea. The famous family name of Fabius, and the lineage names (hereditary cognomen) of Lentulus, and Piso come from the Latin names of beans, lentils, and peas, respectively. Plutarch writes that Cicero was urged to change this deprecatory name when he entered politics but refused, saying that he would make Cicero more glorious than Scaurus ("Swollen-ankled") and Catulus ("Puppy").

=== Education ===
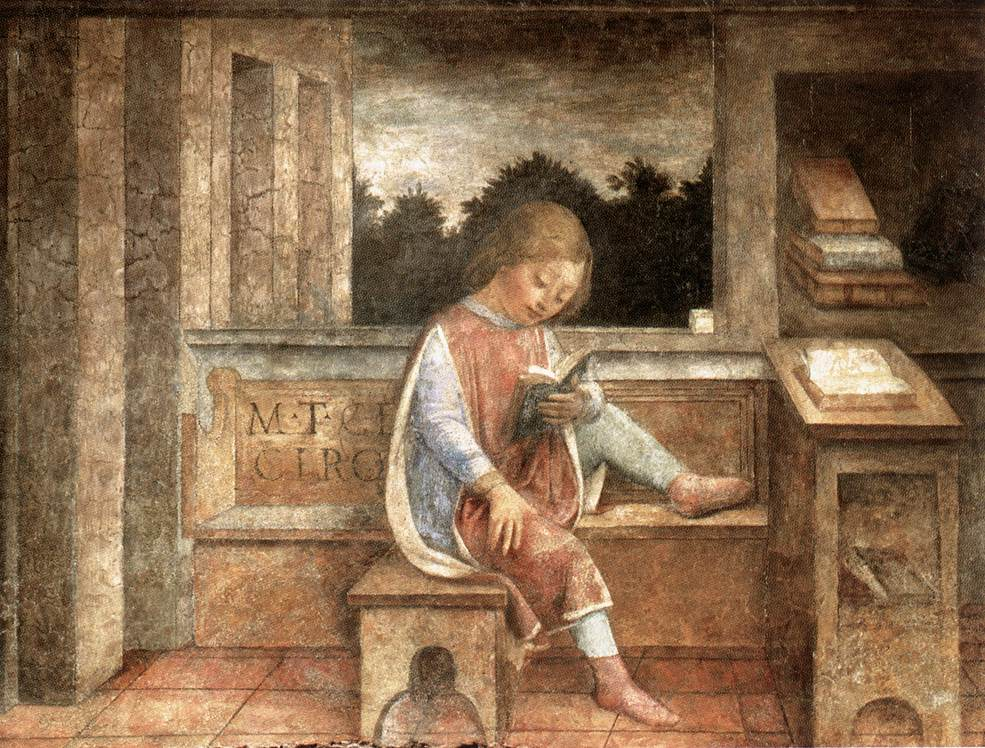
The Young Cicero Reading by Vincenzo Foppa (fresco, 1464), now at the Wallace Collection in London

In 90 BC, at the age of 15, Cicero started serving under Pompey Strabo and later Sulla in the Social War between Rome and its Italian allies. When in Rome during the turbulent plebeian tribunate of Publius Sulpicius Rufus in 88 BC which saw a short bout of fighting between the partisans of Sulpicius and Sulla, who had been elected consul for that year, Cicero found himself greatly impressed by Sulpicius' oratory even if he disagreed with his politics. He continued his studies at Rome, writing a pamphlet titled On Invention relating to rhetorical argumentation and studying philosophy with Greek academics who had fled the ongoing First Mithridatic War.

During this period in Roman history, Greek language and cultural studies were highly valued by the elite classes. Cicero was therefore educated in the teachings of the ancient Greek philosophers, poets, and historians; as he obtained much of his understanding of the theory and practice of rhetoric from the Greek poet Archias. Cicero used his knowledge of Greek to translate many of the theoretical concepts of Greek philosophy into Latin, thus translating Greek philosophical works for a larger audience. It was precisely his broad education that tied him to the traditional Roman elite.

Cicero's interest in philosophy figured heavily in his later career and led to him providing a comprehensive account of Greek philosophy for a Roman audience, including creating a philosophical vocabulary in Latin. In 87 BC, Philo of Larissa, the head of the Platonic Academy that had been founded by Plato in Athens about 300 years earlier, arrived in Rome. Cicero, "inspired by an extraordinary zeal for philosophy", sat enthusiastically at his feet and absorbed Carneades' philosophy of academic skepticism.

According to Plutarch, Cicero was an extremely talented student, whose learning attracted attention from all over Rome, affording him the opportunity to study Roman law under Quintus Mucius Scaevola. Cicero's fellow students were Gaius Marius Minor, Servius Sulpicius Rufus (who became a famous lawyer, one of the few whom Cicero considered superior to himself in legal matters), and Titus Pomponius. The latter two became Cicero's friends for life, and Pomponius (who later received the nickname "Atticus", and whose sister married Cicero's brother) would become, in Cicero's own words, "as a second brother", with both maintaining a lifelong correspondence.

In 79 BC, Cicero left for Greece, Asia Minor and Rhodes. This was perhaps to avoid the potential wrath of Sulla, as Plutarch claims, although Cicero himself says it was to hone his skills and improve his physical fitness. In Athens, he studied philosophy with Antiochus of Ascalon, the "Old Academic" and initiator of Middle Platonism. In Asia Minor, he met the leading orators of the region and continued to study with them. Cicero then journeyed to Rhodes to meet his former teacher, Apollonius Molon, who had taught him in Rome. Molon helped Cicero hone the excesses in his style, as well as train his body and lungs for the demands of public speaking. Charting a middle path between the competing Attic and Asiatic styles, Cicero would ultimately become considered second only to Demosthenes among history's orators.

== Early career ==
=== Early legal activity ===
While Cicero had feared that the law courts would be closed forever, they were reopened in the aftermath of Sulla's civil war and the purging of Sulla's political opponents in the proscriptions. Many of the orators whom Cicero had admired in his youth were now dead from age or political violence. His first major appearance in the courts was in 81 BC at the age of 26 when he delivered Pro Quinctio, a speech defending certain commercial transactions which Cicero had recorded and disseminated.

Pro Roscio Amerino, Cicero's more famous speech defending Sextus Roscius of Ameria on charges of parricide in 80 BC, was his first appearance in criminal court. In this high-profile case, Cicero accused a freedman of the dictator Sulla, Chrysogonus, of fabricating Roscius' father's proscription to obtain Roscius' family's property. Successful in his defence, Cicero tactfully avoided incriminating Sulla of any wrongdoing and developed a positive oratorical reputation for himself.

While Plutarch claims that Cicero left Rome shortly thereafter out of fear of Sulla's response, according to Kathryn Tempest, "most scholars now dismiss this suggestion" because Cicero left Rome after Sulla resigned his dictatorship. For his part, Cicero later claimed that he left Rome, headed for Asia, to develop his physique and develop his oratory. After marrying his wife, Terentia, in 80 BC, he eventually left for Asia Minor with his brother Quintus, his friend Titus Atticus, and others on a long trip spanning most of 79 through 77 BC. Returning to Rome in 77 BC, Cicero again busied himself with legal defence.

=== Early political career ===
At the quaestorian elections in 76 BC, in the first returns from the comitia tributa, Cicero was elected at the minimum age required (30 years) to the post of quaestor. Ex officio, he also became a member of the Senate. In the quaestorian lot, he was assigned to Sicily for 75 BC. The post, which was largely one related to financial administration in support of the state or provincial governors, proved for Cicero an important place where he could gain clients in the provinces. His time in Sicily saw him balance his duties—largely in terms of sending more grain back to Rome—with his support for the provincials, Roman businessmen in the area, and local potentates. Adeptly balancing those responsibilities, he won their gratitude. He was also appreciated by local Syracusans for the rediscovery of the lost tomb of Archimedes, which he personally financed. Promising to lend the Sicilians his oratorical voice, he was called on a few years after his quaestorship to prosecute the Roman province's governor Gaius Verres, for abuse of power and corruption. In 70 BC, at the age of 36, Cicero launched his first high-profile prosecution against Verres, an emblem of the corrupt Sullan supporters who had risen in the chaos of the civil war.

For Cicero, the prosecution of Gaius Verres was a great forensic success. Despite Verres hiring the prominent lawyer Quintus Hortensius as his defence, Cicero—who had spent a lengthy period in Sicily collecting testimonials, gathering evidence, and persuading witnesses to come forward—returned to Rome and won the case in a series of dramatic court battles. His unique style of oratory set him apart from the flamboyant Hortensius. On the conclusion of this case, Cicero came to be considered the greatest orator in Rome. The view that Cicero may have taken the case for reasons of his own is viable. At this point, Hortensius was known as the best lawyer in Rome, and to beat him would guarantee much success and the prestige that Cicero needed to start his career. Cicero's oratorical ability is shown in his character assassination of Verres and various other techniques of persuasion used on the jury. One such example is found in the speech In Verrem, where he states "with you on this bench, gentlemen, with Marcus Acilius Glabrio as your president, I do not understand what Verres can hope to achieve". Oratory was considered a great art in ancient Rome and an important tool for disseminating knowledge and promoting oneself in elections, in part because there were no regular newspapers or mass media. Cicero was neither a patrician nor a plebeian noble (nobiles); his rise to political office despite his relatively humble origins has traditionally been attributed to his brilliance as an orator.

Cicero grew up in a time of civil unrest and war. Sulla's victory in the first of a series of civil wars led to a new constitutional framework that undermined libertas (liberty), the fundamental value of the Roman Republic. Nonetheless, Sulla's reforms strengthened the position of the equestrian class, contributing to that class's growing political power. Cicero was both an Italian eques and a novus homo; more importantly, he was a Roman constitutionalist. His social class and loyalty to the Republic ensured that he would "command the support and confidence of the people as well as the Italian middle classes". He successfully ascended the cursus honorum, holding each magistracy at or near the youngest possible age: quaestor in 75 BC (age 30), aedile in 69 BC (age 36), (Note: Whether Cicero was elected as plebeian aedile or curule aedile is uncertain. In a 1939 article, Lily Ross Taylor argues that he held the plebeian aedilate: Cicero described the games as ludi antiquissimi ("most ancient") and the plebeian aedileship was instituted before the curule. She also notes that in his writings Cicero did not use the full aedilis curulis title, which was of greater prestige. Thomas Robert Shannon Broughton's Magistrates of the Roman Republic lists Cicero's aedilate as plebeian.) and praetor in 66 BC (age 39), when he served as president of the extortion court (lex Calpurnia de repetundis). In 63 BC, around three years later, he was then elected consul.

== Consulship ==
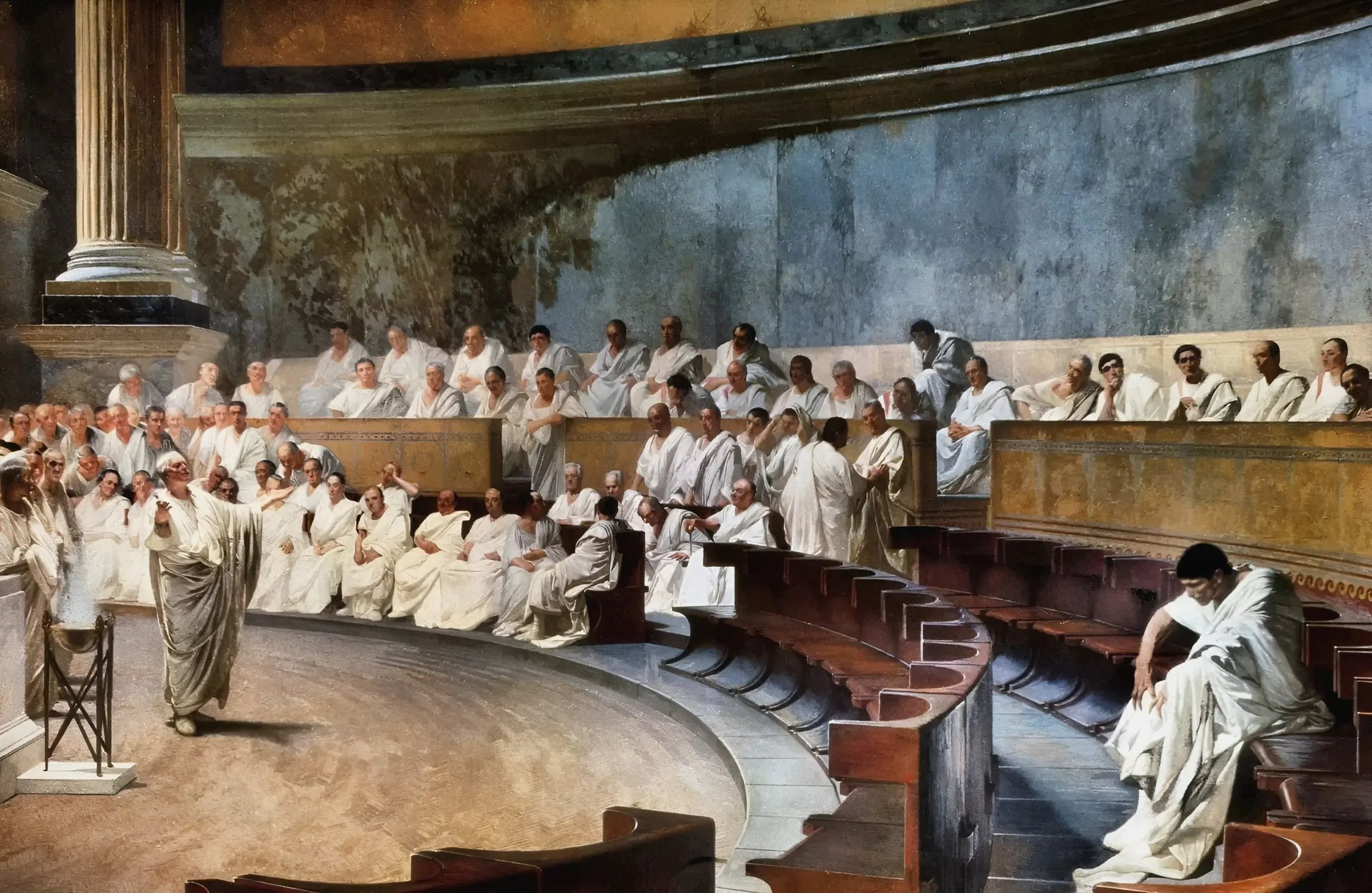
Cicero Denounces Catiline, fresco by Cesare Maccari, 1882–1888

Cicero, seizing the opportunity offered by optimate fear of reform, was elected consul for the year 63 BC; he was elected with the support of every unit of the centuriate assembly, rival members of the post-Sullan establishment, and the leaders of municipalities throughout post-Social War Italy. His co-consul for the year, Gaius Antonius Hybrida, played a minor role.

Cicero began his consular year by opposing a land bill proposed by a plebeian tribune which would have appointed commissioners with semi-permanent authority over land reform. Cicero was also active in the courts, defending Gaius Rabirius from accusations of participating in the unlawful killing of plebeian tribune Lucius Appuleius Saturninus in 100 BC. The prosecution occurred before the comita centuriata and threatened to reopen conflict between the Marian and Sullan factions at Rome. Cicero defended the use of force as being authorised by a senatus consultum ultimum, which would prove similar to his own use of force under such conditions.

=== Catilinarian conspiracy ===
Most famously, in part because of his own publicity, Cicero thwarted a conspiracy led by Lucius Sergius Catilina to overthrow the Roman Republic with the help of foreign armed forces. He procured a senatus consultum ultimum (a recommendation from the Senate attempting to legitimize the use of force), and drove Catiline from the city with four vehement speeches (the Catilinarian orations), which remain outstanding examples of his rhetorical style. The Orations listed Catiline and his followers' debaucheries, and denounced Catiline's senatorial sympathizers as roguish and dissolute debtors clinging to Catiline as a final and desperate hope. Cicero demanded that Catiline and his followers leave the city. At the conclusion of Cicero's first speech, which was made in the Temple of Jupiter Stator), Catiline hurriedly left the Senate. In his following speeches, Cicero did not directly address Catiline. He delivered the second and third orations before the people, and the last one again before the Senate. By these speeches, Cicero wanted to prepare the Senate for the worst possible case; he also delivered more evidence, against Catiline.

Catiline fled and left behind his followers to start the revolution from within while he himself assaulted the city with an army of "moral and financial bankrupts, or of honest fanatics and adventurers". It is alleged that Catiline had attempted to involve the Allobroges, a tribe of Transalpine Gaul, in their plot but Cicero, working with the Gauls, was able to seize letters that incriminated the five conspirators and forced them to confess in front of the Senate. The senate then deliberated upon the conspirators' punishment. As it was the dominant advisory body to the various legislative assemblies rather than a judicial body, there were limits to its power; however, martial law was in effect, and it was feared that simple house arrest or exile—the standard options—not remove the threat to the state. At first, Decimus Junius Silanus spoke for the "extreme penalty"; however, during the debate, many were swayed by Julius Caesar, who decried the precedent it would set and argued in favour of life imprisonment in various Italian towns. Cato the Younger then rose in defence of the death penalty and the Senate finally agreed on the matter, and came down in support of the death penalty. Cicero had the conspirators taken to the Tullianum, the notorious Roman prison, where they were strangled. Cicero himself accompanied the former consul Publius Cornelius Lentulus Sura, one of the conspirators, to the Tullianum.

Cicero received the honorific "pater patriae" ("father of the fatherland") for his efforts to suppress the conspiracy; however, he lived thereafter in fear of trial or exile for having put Roman citizens to death without trial. While the senatus consultum ultimum gave some legitimacy to the use of force against the conspirators, (Note: Historian Thomas Ernst Josef Wiedemann describes the senatus consultum ultimum by the late republic as "little more than a fig-leaf by those who could muster a majority in the senate ... to legitimate the use of force".) Cicero also argued that Catiline's conspiracy, by virtue of its treason, made the conspirators enemies of the state and forfeited the protections intrinsically possessed by Roman citizens. The consuls moved decisively. Antonius Hybrida was dispatched to defeat Catiline in battle that year, preventing Crassus or Pompey from exploiting the situation for their own political aims.

After the suppression of the conspiracy, Cicero was proud of his accomplishment. Some of his political enemies argued that although the act gained Cicero popularity, he exaggerated the extent of his success. He overestimated his popularity again several years later after being exiled from Italy and then allowed back from exile. At this time, he claimed that the republic would be restored along with him. Shortly after completing his consulship, in late 62 BC, Cicero arranged the purchase of a large townhouse on the Palatine Hill previously owned by Rome's richest citizen, Marcus Licinius Crassus. To finance the purchase, Cicero borrowed some two million sesterces from Publius Cornelius Sulla, whom he had previously defended from court. It cost an exorbitant sum, 3.5 million sesterces, which required Cicero to arrange for a loan from his co-consul Gaius Antonius Hybrida based on the expected profits from Antonius's proconsulship in Macedonia. Cicero boasted his house was in conspectu prope totius urbis ("in sight of nearly the whole city"), only a short walk from the Roman Forum.

== Exile and return ==
In 60 BC, Julius Caesar invited Cicero to be the fourth member of his existing partnership with Pompey and Marcus Licinius Crassus, an assembly that would eventually be called the First Triumvirate. Cicero refused the invitation because he suspected it would undermine the Republic, and because he was strongly opposed to anything unconstitutional that limited the powers of the consuls and replaced them with non-elected officials.

During Caesar's consulship of 59 BC, the triumvirate had achieved many of their goals of land reform, publicani debt forgiveness, ratification of Pompeian conquests, etc. With Caesar leaving for his provinces, they wished to maintain their hold on politics. They engineered the adoption of patrician Publius Clodius Pulcher into a plebeian family and had him elected as one of the ten tribunes of the plebs for 58 BC. Clodius used the triumvirate's backing to push through legislation that benefited them. He introduced several laws (the leges Clodiae) that made him popular with the people, strengthening his power base, then he turned on Cicero. Clodius passed a law which made it illegal to offer "fire and water" (i.e. shelter or food) to anyone who executed a Roman citizen without a trial. Cicero, having executed members of the Catiline conspiracy four years previously without formal trial, was clearly the intended target. Furthermore, many believed that Clodius acted in concert with the triumvirate who feared that Cicero would seek to abolish many of Caesar's accomplishments while consul the year before. Cicero argued that the senatus consultum ultimum indemnified him from punishment, and he attempted to gain the support of the senators and consuls, especially of Pompey.

Cicero grew out his hair, dressed in mourning and toured the streets. Clodius' gangs dogged him, hurling abuse, stones and even excrement. Hortensius, trying to rally to his old rival's support, was almost lynched. The Senate and the consuls were cowed. Caesar, who was still encamped near Rome, was apologetic but said he could do nothing when Cicero brought himself to grovel in the proconsul's tent. Everyone seemed to have abandoned Cicero. After Clodius passed a law to deny to Cicero fire and water (i.e. shelter) within four hundred miles of Rome, Cicero went into exile. He arrived at Thessalonica, on 23 May 58 BC. In his absence, Clodius, who lived next door to Cicero on the Palatine, arranged for Cicero's house to be confiscated by the state, and was even able to purchase a part of the property in order to extend his own house. After demolishing Cicero's house, Clodius had the land consecrated and symbolically erected a temple of Liberty (aedes Libertatis) on the vacant land.

Cicero's exile caused him to fall into depression. He wrote to Atticus: "Your pleas have prevented me from committing suicide. But what is there to live for? Don't blame me for complaining. My afflictions surpass any you ever heard of earlier." After the intervention of recently elected tribune Titus Annius Milo, acting on the behalf of Pompey who wanted Cicero as a client, the Senate voted in favour of recalling Cicero from exile. Clodius cast the single vote against the decree. Cicero returned to Italy on 5 August 57 BC, landing at Brundisium. He was greeted by a cheering crowd, and, to his delight, his beloved daughter Tullia. In his Oratio De Domo Sua Ad Pontifices, Cicero convinced the College of Pontiffs to rule that the consecration of his land was invalid, thereby allowing him to regain his property and rebuild his house on the Palatine.

Cicero tried to re-enter politics as an independent operator, but his attempts to attack portions of Caesar's legislation were unsuccessful, and encouraged Caesar to re-solidify his political alliance with Pompey and Crassus. The conference at Luca in 56 BC left the three-man alliance in domination of the republic's politics; this forced Cicero to recant and support the triumvirate out of fear from being entirely excluded from public life. After the conference, Cicero lavishly praised Caesar's achievements, got the Senate to vote a thanksgiving for Caesar's victories, and grant money to pay his troops. He also delivered a speech "On the consular provinces" (Latin: de provinciis consularibus), which checked an attempt by Caesar's enemies to strip him of his provinces in Gaul. After this, a cowed Cicero concentrated on his literary works. It is uncertain whether he was directly involved in politics for the following few years. His legal work largely consisted of defending allies of the ruling triumvirs and his own personal friends and allies; in his speech the Pro Caelio, he defended his former pupil Marcus Caelius Rufus against a charge of murder in 56. (Note: Englert, Walter (2010). "Cicero". In Gagarin, Michael (ed.). The Oxford Encyclopedia of Ancient Greece and Rome. Oxford: Oxford University Press. ISBN 9780195388398 – via Oxford Reference. On Caelius's case, see Berry, Dominic H. (2020). Cicero's Catilinarians. Oxford: Oxford University Press. p. xx. ISBN 9780195326468..) Under the influence of the triumvirs, he had also defended his former enemies Publius Vatinius (in August 54 BC), Marcus Aemilius Scaurus (between July and September) and Gnaeus Plancius (with the Pro Plancio) in September, which weakened his prestige and sparked attacks on his integrity: Luca Grillo has suggested these cases as the source of the poet Catullus's double-edged comment that Cicero was "the best defender of anybody". (Note: Grillo, Luca (2014). "A Double Sermocinatio and a Resolved Dilemma in Cicero's Pro Plancio". The Classical Quarterly. 64 (1): 215. doi:10.1017/S0009838813000669. eISSN 1471-6844. JSTOR 26546296., quoting Catullus 49.7.)

== Governorship of Cilicia ==
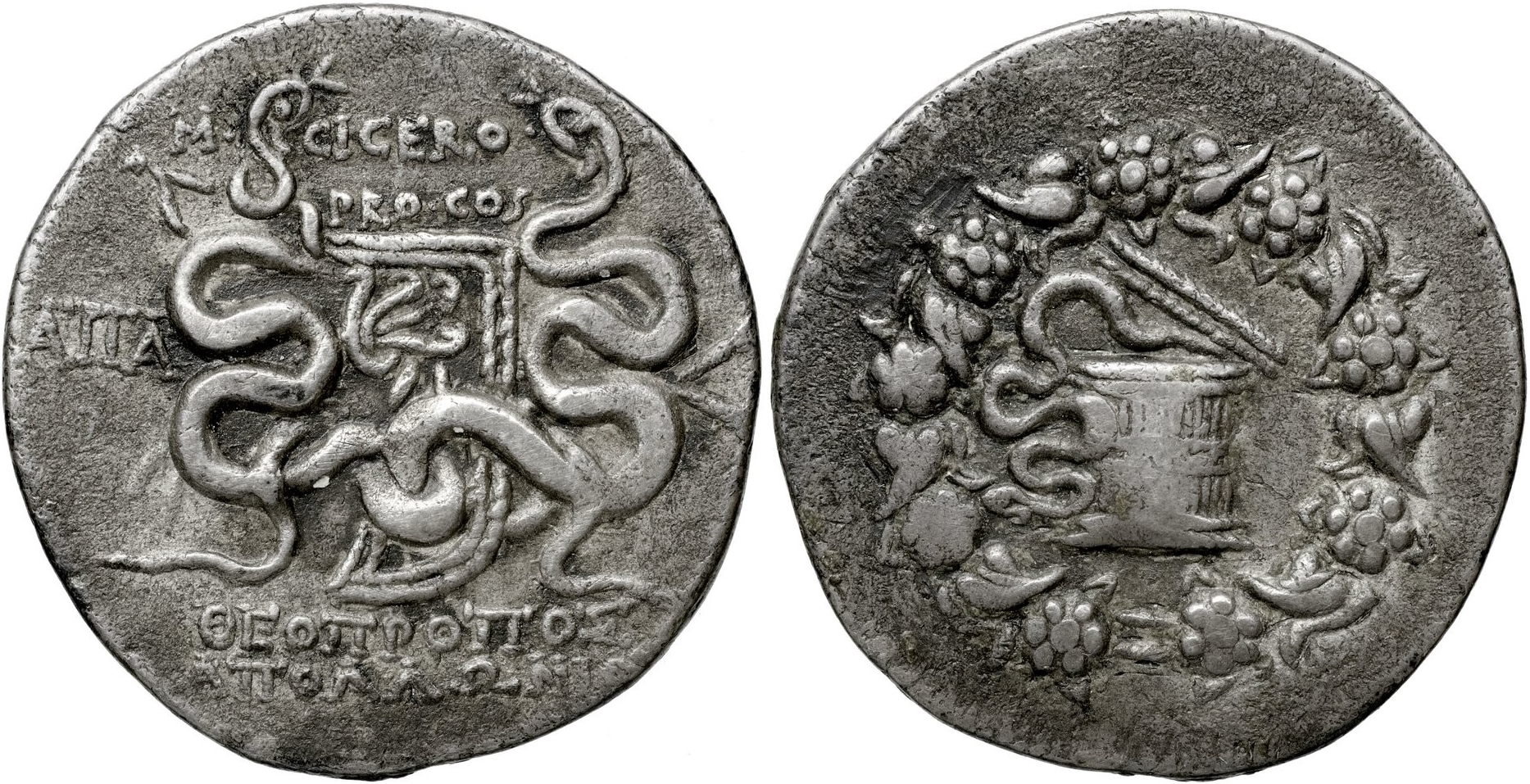
Cistophorus minted by Cicero in Apamea Cibotus in 51–50 BC, while serving as proconsul of Cilicia.

In 51 BC, Cicero reluctantly accepted a promagistracy (as proconsul) in Cilicia for the year; there were few other former consuls eligible as a result of a legislative requirement enacted by Pompey in 52 BC specifying an interval of five years between a consulship or praetorship and a provincial command. He served as proconsul of Cilicia from May 51 BC, arriving in the provinces three months later around August.

In 53 BC, Marcus Licinius Crassus had been defeated by the Parthians at the Battle of Carrhae. This opened the Roman East for a Parthian invasion, causing unrest in Syria and Cilicia. Cicero restored calm by his mild system of government. He discovered that a great amount of public property had been embezzled by corrupt previous governors and members of their staff, and did his utmost to restore it. Thus he greatly improved the condition of the cities. He retained the civil rights of, and exempted from penalties, the men who gave the property back. Besides this, he was extremely frugal in his outlays for staff and private expenses during his governorship, and this made him highly popular among the natives.

Besides his activity in ameliorating the hard pecuniary situation of the province, Cicero was also creditably active in the military sphere. Early in his governorship he received information that prince Pacorus, son of Orodes II the king of the Parthians, had crossed the Euphrates, and was ravaging the Syrian countryside and had even besieged Cassius (the interim Roman commander in Syria) in Antioch. Cicero eventually marched with two understrength legions and a large contingent of auxiliary cavalry to Cassius's relief. Pacorus and his army had already given up on besieging Antioch and were heading south through Syria, ravaging the countryside again. Cassius and his legions followed them, harrying them wherever they went, eventually ambushing and defeating them near Antigonea.

Another large troop of Parthian horsemen was defeated by Cicero's cavalry who happened to run into them while scouting ahead of the main army. Cicero next defeated some robbers who were based on Mount Amanus and was hailed as imperator by his troops. Afterwards, he led his army against the independent Cilician mountain tribes, besieging their fortress of Pindenissum. It took him 47 days to reduce the place, which fell in December. On 30 July 50 BC, Cicero left the province to his brother Quintus, who had accompanied him on his governorship as his legate. On his way back to Rome, he stopped in Rhodes and then went to Athens, where he caught up with his old friend Titus Pomponius Atticus and met men of great learning.

== Caesar's civil war ==
Cicero arrived in Rome on 4 January 49 BC. He stayed outside the pomerium, to retain his promagisterial powers: either in expectation of a triumph or to retain his independent command authority in the coming civil war. The struggle between Pompey and Julius Caesar grew more intense in 50 BC. Cicero favoured Pompey, seeing him as a defender of the Senate and Republican tradition, but at that time avoided openly alienating Caesar. When Caesar invaded Italy in 49 BC, Cicero fled Rome. Caesar, seeking an endorsement by a senior senator, courted Cicero's favour; even so, Cicero slipped out of Italy and traveled to Dyrrhachium where Pompey's staff was situated. Cicero traveled with the Pompeian forces to Pharsalus in Macedonia in 48 BC, although he was quickly losing faith in the competence and righteousness of the Pompeian side. Eventually, he provoked the hostility of his fellow senator Cato, who told him that he would have been of more use to the cause of the optimates if he had stayed in Rome. After Caesar's victory at the Battle of Pharsalus on 9 August, Cicero refused to take command of the Pompeian forces and continue the war. He returned to Rome, still as a promagistrate with his lictors, in 47 BC, and dismissed them upon his crossing the pomerium and renouncing his command.

In a letter to Varro on c. 20 April 46 BC, Cicero outlined his strategy under Caesar's dictatorship; however, Cicero was taken by surprise when the Liberatores assassinated Caesar on the Ides of March, 44 BC. Cicero was not included in the conspiracy, even though the conspirators were sure of his sympathy. Marcus Junius Brutus called out Cicero's name, asking him to restore the republic when he lifted his bloodstained dagger after the assassination. A letter Cicero wrote in February 43 BC to Trebonius, one of the conspirators, began, "How I could wish that you had invited me to that most glorious banquet on the Ides of March!" Cicero became a popular leader during the period of instability following the assassination. He had no respect for Mark Antony, who was scheming to take revenge upon Caesar's murderers. In exchange for amnesty for the assassins, he arranged for the Senate to agree not to declare Caesar to have been a tyrant, which allowed the Caesarians to have lawful support and kept Caesar's reforms and policies intact.

== Opposition to Mark Antony and death ==
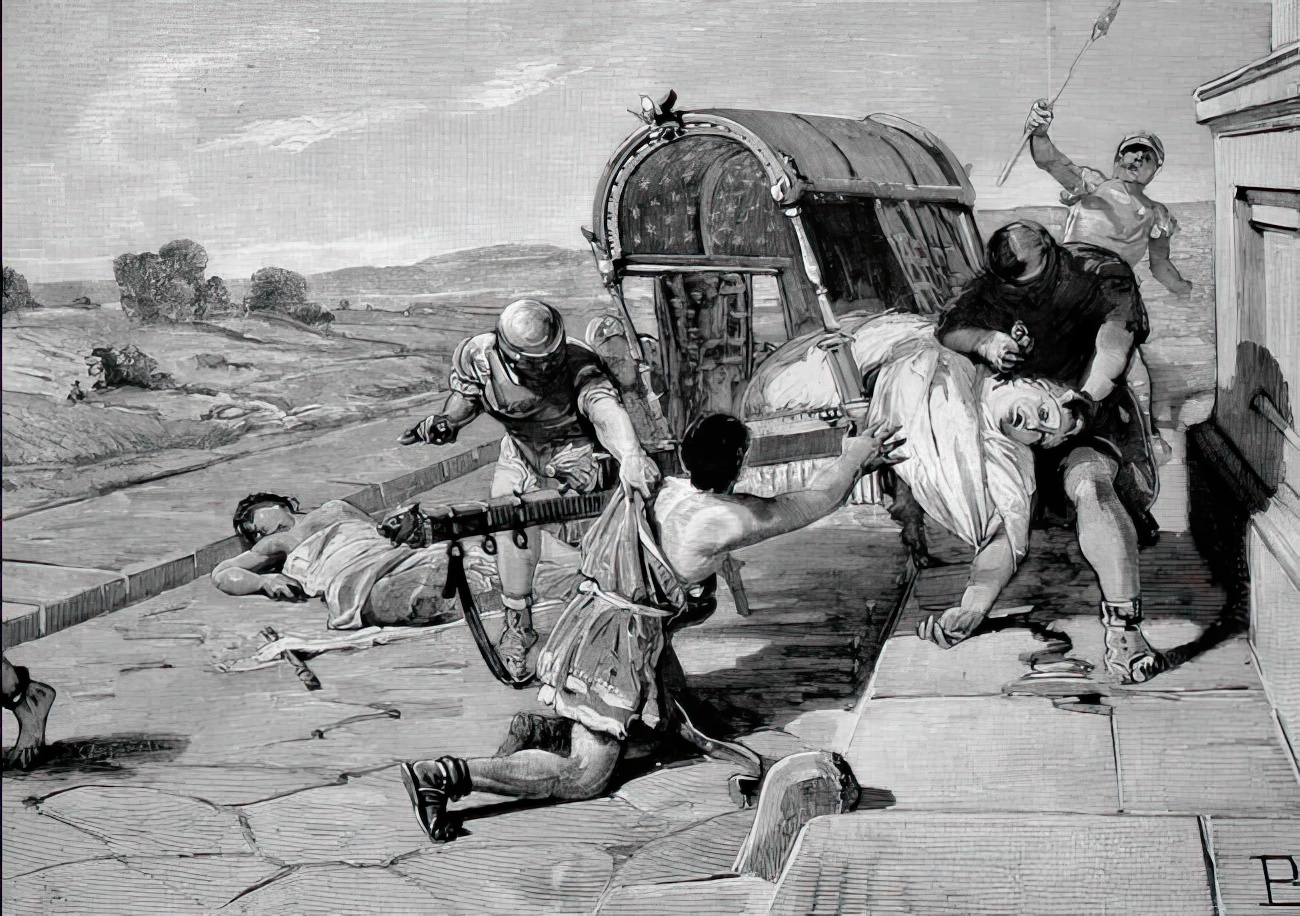
Cicero dragged from his litter and assassinated by soldiers under the command of Mark Antony in 43 BC (1886 illustration)

In April 43 BC, "diehard republicans" may have revived the ancient position of princeps senatus (leader of the Senate) for Cicero. This position had been very prestigious until the constitutional reforms of Sulla in 82–80 BC, which removed most of its importance. On the other side, Antony was consul and leader of the Caesarian faction, and unofficial executor of Caesar's public will. Relations between the two were never friendly and worsened after Cicero claimed that Antony was taking liberties in interpreting Caesar's wishes and intentions. Octavian was Caesar's adopted son and heir. After he returned to Italy, Cicero began to play him against Antony. He praised Octavian, declaring he would not make the same mistakes as his father. He attacked Antony in a series of speeches he called the Philippics, named after Demosthenes's denunciations of Philip II of Macedon. At the time, Cicero's popularity as a public figure was unrivalled.

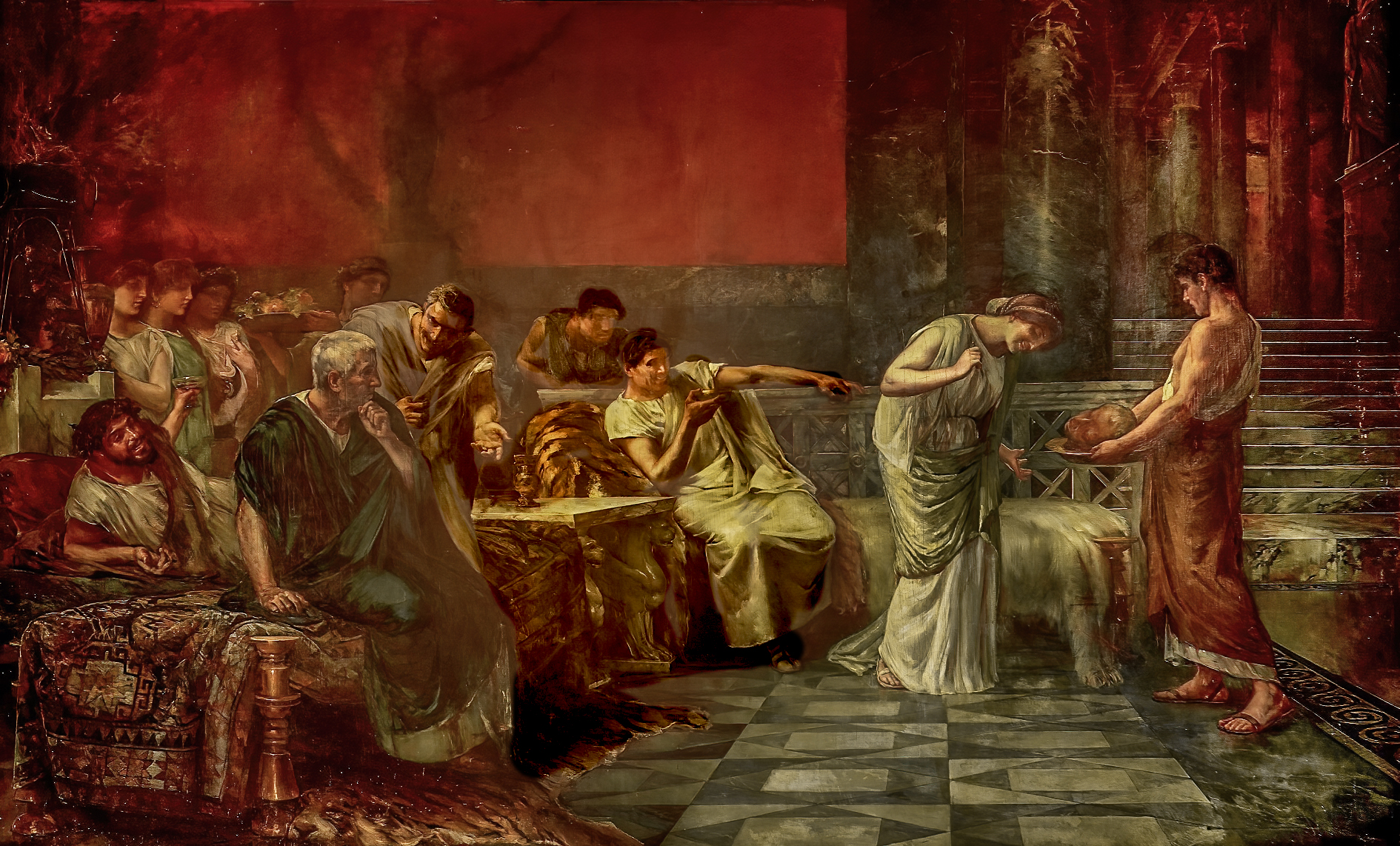
The Vengeance of Fulvia by Francisco Maura y Montaner (1888), depicting Fulvia inspecting the severed head of Cicero

Cicero supported Decimus Junius Brutus Albinus as governor of Cisalpine Gaul (Gallia Cisalpina) and urged the Senate to name Antony an enemy of the state. The speech of Lucius Piso, Caesar's father-in-law, delayed proceedings against Antony. Antony was later declared an enemy of the state when he refused to lift the siege of Mutina, which was in the hands of Decimus Brutus. Cicero's plan to drive out Antony failed. Antony and Octavian reconciled and allied with Lepidus to form the Second Triumvirate after the successive battles of Forum Gallorum and Mutina. The alliance came into official existence with the lex Titia, passed on 27 November 43 BC, which gave each triumvir a consular imperium for five years. The Triumvirate immediately began a proscription of their enemies, modeled after that of Sulla in 82 BC. Cicero and all of his contacts and supporters were numbered among the enemies of the state, even though Octavian argued for two days against Cicero being added to the list.

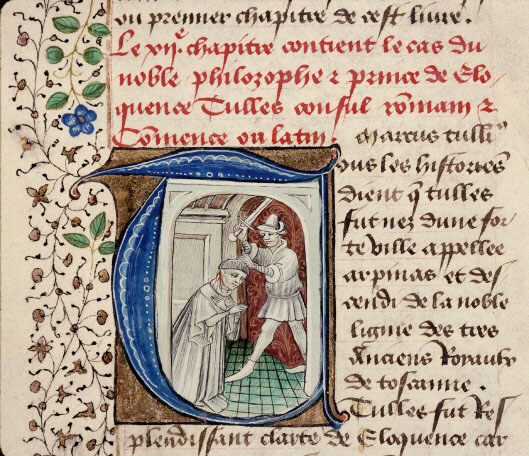
Cicero's death (France, 15th century)

Cicero was one of the most viciously and doggedly hunted among the proscribed. He was viewed with sympathy by a large segment of the public and many people refused to report that they had seen him. He was caught on 7 December 43 BC leaving his villa in Formiae in a litter heading to the coast, where he hoped to embark on a ship destined for Macedonia. When his killers—Herennius (a Centurion) and Popilius (a Tribune)—arrived, Cicero's own slaves said they had not seen him; however, he was given away by Philologus, a freedman of his brother Quintus Cicero. As reported by Seneca the Elder, according to the historian Aufidius Bassus, Cicero's last words are said to have been:

Ego vero consisto. Accede, veterane, et, si hoc saltim potes recte facere, incide cervicem.
I go no further: approach, veteran soldier, and, if you can at least do so much properly, sever this neck.

Cicero bowed to his captors, leaning his head out of the litter in a gladiatorial gesture to ease the task. By baring his neck and throat to the soldiers, he was indicating that he would not resist. According to Plutarch, Herennius first slew him, then cut off his head. On Antony's instructions, his hands, which had penned the Philippics against Antony, were cut off as well; these were nailed along with his head on the Rostra in the Forum Romanum according to the tradition of Marius and Sulla, both of whom had displayed the heads of their enemies in the Forum. Cicero was the only victim of the proscriptions who was displayed in that manner. According to Cassius Dio, in a story often mistakenly attributed to Plutarch, Antony's wife Fulvia took Cicero's head, pulled out his tongue, and jabbed it repeatedly with her hairpin in final revenge against Cicero's power of speech.

Cicero's son, Marcus Tullius Cicero Minor, during his year as a consul in 30 BC, avenged his father's death, to a certain extent, when he announced to the Senate Mark Antony's naval defeat at Actium in 31 BC by Octavian. Octavian is reported to have praised Cicero as a patriot and a scholar of meaning in later times, within the circle of his family; however, it was Octavian's acquiescence that had allowed Cicero to be killed, as Cicero was condemned by the new triumvirate. Cicero's career as a statesman was marked by inconsistencies and a tendency to shift his position in response to changes in the political climate. His indecision may be attributed to his sensitive and impressionable personality; he was prone to overreaction in the face of political and private change. C. Asinius Pollio, a contemporary Roman statesman and historian, wrote: "Would that he had been able to endure prosperity with greater self-control, and adversity with more fortitude!"

== Personal life and family ==
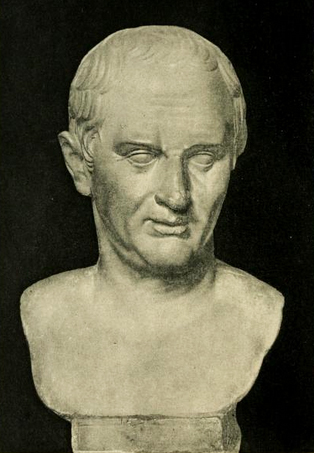
Cicero about age 60, from a marble bust

Cicero married Terentia, probably at the age of 27, in 79 BC. According to the upper-class mores of the day it was a marriage of convenience but lasted harmoniously for nearly 30 years. Terentia's family was wealthy, probably the plebeian noble house of Terenti Varrones, thus meeting the needs of Cicero's political ambitions in both economic and social terms. She had a half-sister named Fabia, who as a child had become a Vestal Virgin, a great honour. Terentia was a strong-willed woman and (citing Plutarch) "took more interest in her husband's political career than she allowed him to take in household affairs".

In the 50s BC, Cicero's letters to Terentia became shorter and colder. He complained to his friends that Terentia had betrayed him but did not specify in which sense. Perhaps the marriage could not outlast the strain of the political upheaval in Rome, Cicero's involvement in it, and various other disputes between the two. The divorce appears to have taken place in 51 BC or shortly before. In 46 or 45 BC, Cicero married a young girl, Publilia, who had been his ward. It is thought that Cicero needed her money, particularly after having to repay the dowry of Terentia, who came from a wealthy family.

Although his marriage to Terentia was one of convenience, it is commonly known that Cicero held great love for his daughter Tullia. When she suddenly became ill in February 45 BC and died after having seemingly recovered from giving birth to a son in January, Cicero was stunned. He wrote to Atticus, "I have lost the one thing that bound me to life." Atticus told him to come for a visit during the first weeks of his bereavement, so that he could comfort him when his pain was at its greatest. In Atticus's large library, Cicero read everything that the Greek philosophers had written about overcoming grief but "my sorrow defeats all consolation". Caesar and Brutus, as well as Servius Sulpicius Rufus, sent him letters of condolence.

Cicero hoped that his son Marcus would become a philosopher like him; however, Marcus himself wished for a military career. He joined the army of Pompey in 49 BC, and after Pompey's defeat at Pharsalus 48 BC, he was pardoned by Caesar. Cicero sent him to Athens to study as a disciple of the peripatetic philosopher Kratippos in 48 BC. In practice, he used this absence from "his father's vigilant eye" to "eat, drink, and be merry". After Cicero's death, he joined the army of the Liberatores but was later pardoned by Augustus. Augustus's bad conscience for having given in to Cicero's being put on the proscription list during the Second Triumvirate led him to aid considerably Marcus Minor's career. He became an augur and was nominated consul in 30 BC together with Augustus. As such, he was responsible for revoking the honours of Mark Antony, who was responsible for the proscription and could in this way take revenge. Later he was appointed proconsul of Syria and the province of Asia.

== Legacy ==
=== Writer ===
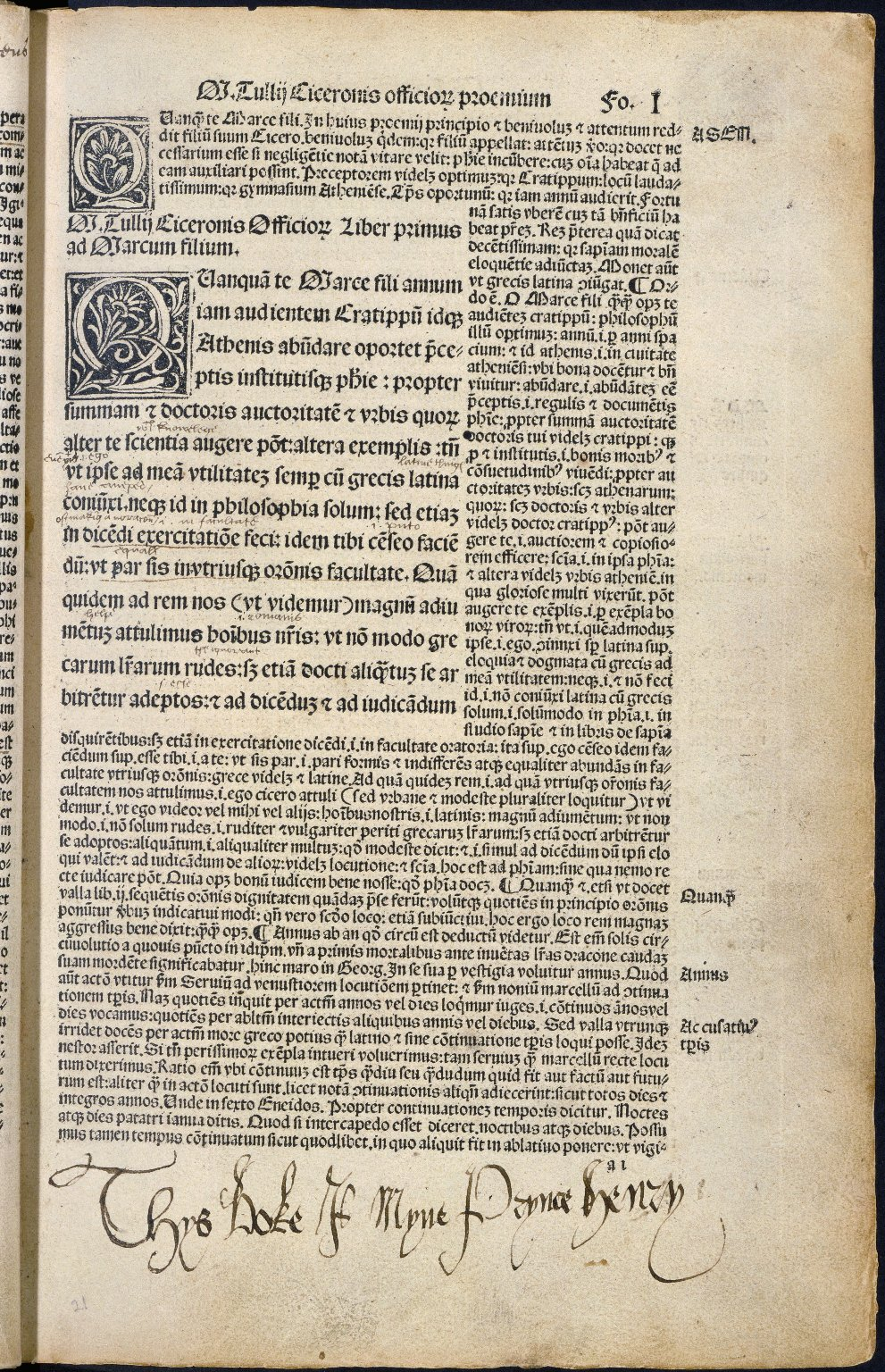
Henry VIII's childhood copy of De Officiis, bearing the inscription in his hand, "Thys boke is myne Prynce Henry" ("This book is mine, [signed] Prince Henry")

According to the Latin scholar Mario Citroni, fellow Latin scholar Emanuele Narducci suggested that the period of history in which Cicero lived and wrote as a protagonist could be defined as a "short century", using historian Eric Hobsbawm's formula in The Age of Extremes, not as purely modernising lens but as a call to contemporaneity to rediscover aspects of archaism and barbarism. Cicero has been traditionally considered the master of Latin prose, with Quintilian declaring that Cicero was "not the name of a man, but of eloquence itself". The English words Ciceronian (meaning "eloquent") and cicerone (meaning "local guide") derive from his name. He is credited with transforming Latin from a modest utilitarian language into a versatile literary medium capable of expressing abstract and complicated thoughts with clarity. Caesar praised Cicero's achievement by saying "it is more important to have greatly extended the frontiers of the Roman spirit than the frontiers of the Roman empire". According to John William Mackail, "Cicero's unique and imperishable glory is that he created the language of the civilised world, and used that language to create a style which nineteen centuries have not replaced, and in some respects have hardly altered."

Cicero was an energetic writer with an interest in a wide variety of subjects, in keeping with the Hellenistic philosophical and rhetorical traditions in which he was trained. The quality and ready accessibility of Ciceronian texts favoured very wide distribution and inclusion in teaching curricula, as suggested by a graffito at Pompeii, admonishing: "You will like Cicero, or you will be whipped." Cicero was greatly admired by influential Church Fathers such as Augustine of Hippo, who credited Hortensius (Cicero's lost literary work) for his eventual conversion to Christianity, and St. Jerome, who had a feverish vision in which he was accused of being "follower of Cicero and not of Christ" before the judgment seat. This influence further increased after the Early Middle Ages in Europe, where more of his writings survived than any other Latin author's. Medieval philosophers were influenced by Cicero's writings on natural law and innate rights.

Petrarch's rediscovery of Cicero's letters provided the impetus for searches for ancient Greek and Latin writings scattered throughout European monasteries, and the subsequent rediscovery of classical antiquity led to the Renaissance. Subsequently, Cicero became synonymous with classical Latin to such an extent that a number of humanist scholars began to assert that no Latin word or phrase should be used unless it appeared in Cicero's works, a stance criticised by Erasmus. His voluminous correspondence, much of it addressed to his friend Atticus, has been especially influential, introducing the art of refined letter writing to European culture. Cornelius Nepos, the first century BC biographer of Atticus, remarked that Cicero's letters contained such a wealth of detail "concerning the inclinations of leading men, the faults of the generals, and the revolutions in the government" that their reader had little need for a history of the period. Among Cicero's admirers were Desiderius Erasmus, Martin Luther, and John Locke. Following the invention of Johannes Gutenberg's printing press, De Officiis was the second book printed in Europe, after the Gutenberg Bible. Scholars note Cicero's influence on the rebirth of religious toleration in the 17th century.

Cicero was especially popular with the Philosophes of the 18th century, including Edward Gibbon, Diderot, David Hume, Montesquieu, and Voltaire. Gibbon wrote of his first experience reading the author's collective works thus: "I tasted the beauty of the language; I breathed the spirit of freedom; and I imbibed from his precepts and examples the public and private sense of a man ... after finishing the great author, a library of eloquence and reason, I formed a more extensive plan of reviewing the Latin classics..."

=== Philosopher ===
Voltaire called Cicero "the greatest as well as the most elegant of Roman philosophers" and even staged a play based on Cicero's role in the Catilinarian conspiracy, called Rome Sauvée, ou Catilina, to "make young people who go to the theatre acquainted with Cicero." Voltaire was spurred to pen the drama as a rebuff to his rival Claude Prosper Jolyot de Crébillon's own play Catilina, which had portrayed Cicero as a coward and villain who hypocritically married his own daughter to Catiline. Montesquieu produced his "Discourse on Cicero" in 1717, in which he heaped praise on the author because he rescued "philosophy from the hands of scholars, and freed it from the confusion of a foreign language". Montesquieu went on to declare that Cicero was "of all the ancients, the one who had the most personal merit, and whom I would prefer to resemble."

Cicero the republican inspired the Founding Fathers of the United States and the revolutionaries of the French Revolution. John Adams said, "As all the ages of the world have not produced a greater statesman and philosopher united than Cicero, his authority should have great weight." Thomas Jefferson names Cicero as one of a handful of major figures who contributed to a tradition "of public right" that informed his draft of the Declaration of Independence and shaped American understandings of "the common sense" basis for the right of revolution. Camille Desmoulins said of the French republicans in 1789 that they were "mostly young people who, nourished by the reading of Cicero at school, had become passionate enthusiasts for liberty".

In the modern era, American libertarian Jim Powell starts his history of liberty with the sentence: "Marcus Tullius Cicero expressed principles that became the bedrock of liberty in the modern world." Likewise, no other ancient personality has inspired as much venomous dislike as Cicero, especially in more modern times. His commitment to the values of the Republic accommodated a hatred of the poor and persistent opposition to the advocates and mechanisms of popular representation. Cicero has faced criticism for exaggerating the democratic qualities of republican Rome, and for defending the Roman oligarchy against the popular reforms of Caesar. Michael Parenti admits Cicero's abilities as an orator but finds him a vain, pompous, and hypocritical personality who, when it suited him, could show public support for popular causes that he privately despised. Parenti presents Cicero's prosecution of the Catiline conspiracy as legally flawed at least, and possibly unlawful.

=== Politician ===
As a politician, Cicero was often the target of criticism, just as he was much praised, from both ancient and modern times. The accusations leveled at him range from inconsistency to vanity. His conduct can be justified if contextualised in the politics of the time, which revolved around a game of agreements and conflicts between power groups and noble families who exploited political labels for personal aims. While linking optimates to Greek aristokratia (ἀριστοκρατία), Cicero himself also used the word populares to describe politics "completely compatible with ... honourable aristocratic behaviour".

According to Gábor Hamza, a professor of Comparative Law, Roman Law, and the legal system of Eastern European countries, Cicero's political theory of the state can be attractive to both conservative and progressive thinkers. Conservatives appreciate his return to tradition, while progressives emphasises his absolute refusal of autocracy. This is because Cicero's theory of the state is open to multiple interpretations (interpretatio multiplex) as it includes republican ideas, liberty (libertas), the refusal of tyranny, the mixed government (miktè politeia), the inviolability of private property, and political, legal, and social equality.

=== Astronomy ===
Cicero had an influence on modern astronomy. Nicolaus Copernicus, searching for ancient views on earth motion, said that he "first ... found in Cicero that Hicetas supposed the earth to move." Notably, "Cicero" was the name attributed to size 12 font in typesetting table drawers. For ease of reference, type sizes 3, 4, 5, 6, 7, 8, 9, 10, 12, 14, 16, and 20 were all given different names.

== Works ==
Marci Tullii Ciceronis Opera Omnia (1566)

Cicero was declared a righteous pagan by the Early Church. Subsequent Roman and medieval Christian writers quoted liberally from his works De re publica (On the Republic) and De Legibus (On the Laws), and much of his work has been recreated from these surviving fragments. Cicero also articulated an early, abstract conceptualisation of rights, based on ancient law and custom. Of Cicero's books, six on rhetoric have survived, as well as parts of seven on philosophy. Of his speeches, 88 were recorded but only 52 survive. (Note: Although sources vary, they seem to indicate that 52 survived in whole and 6 more in part.)

== In archaeology ==
Cicero's great repute in Italy has led to numerous ruins being identified as having belonged to him, although none have been substantiated with absolute certainty. In Formia, two Roman-era ruins are popularly believed to be Cicero's mausoleum, the Tomba di Cicerone, and the villa where he was assassinated in 43 BC. The latter building is centred around a central hall with Doric columns and a coffered vault, with a separate nymphaeum, on five acres of land near Formia. A modern villa was built on the site after the Rubino family purchased the land from Ferdinand II of the Two Sicilies in 1868. Cicero's supposed tomb is a 24-meter (79 feet) tall tower on an opus quadratum base on the ancient Appian Way outside of Formia. Some suggest that it is not Cicero's tomb, and argue instead that it is a monument built on the spot where Cicero was intercepted and assassinated while trying to reach the sea.

In Pompeii, a large villa excavated in the mid 18th century just outside the Herculaneum Gate was widely believed to have been Cicero's, who was known to have owned a holiday villa in Pompeii he called his Pompeianum. The villa was stripped of its fine frescoes and mosaics and then re-buried after 1763, and it has yet to be re-excavated; however, contemporaneous descriptions of the building from the excavators combined with Cicero's own references to his Pompeianum differ, making it unlikely that it is Cicero's villa.

In Rome, the location of Cicero's house has been roughly identified from excavations of the Republican-era stratum on the northwestern slope of the Palatine Hill. Cicero's domus has long been known to have stood in the area, according to his own descriptions and those of later authors; there is some debate about whether it stood near the base of the hill, very close to the Roman Forum, or nearer to the summit. During his life, the area was the most desirable in Rome, densely occupied with Patrician houses including the Domus Publica of Julius Caesar and the home of Cicero's mortal enemy Clodius.

== Notable fictional portrayals ==
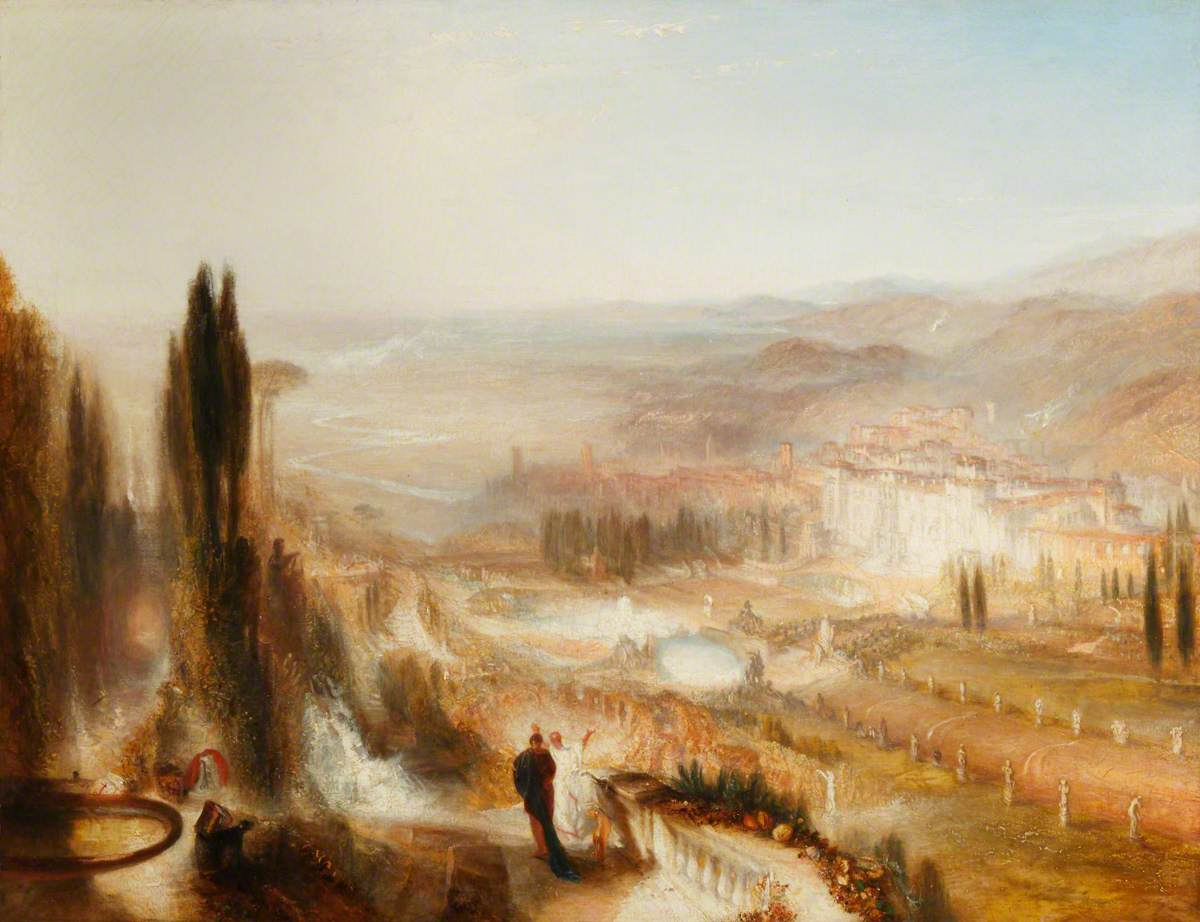
Cicero at His Villa at Tusculum by J. M. W. Turner, 1839

In Dante's 1320 poem the Divine Comedy, the author encounters Cicero, among other philosophers, in Limbo. Ben Jonson dramatised the conspiracy of Catiline in his play Catiline His Conspiracy, featuring Cicero as a character. Cicero also appears as a minor character in William Shakespeare's play Julius Caesar. Cicero was portrayed on the motion picture screen by British actor Alan Napier in the 1953 film Julius Caesar, based on Shakespeare's play. He has also been played by such noted actors as Michael Hordern (in Cleopatra), and by André Morell (in the 1970 Julius Caesar). Cicero was portrayed by David Bamber in the HBO series Rome (2005–2007) and appeared in both seasons.

In the historical novel series Masters of Rome, Colleen McCullough presents a not-so-flattering depiction of Cicero's career, showing him struggling with an inferiority complex and vanity, morally flexible and fatally indiscreet, while his rival Caesar is shown in a more approving light. Cicero is portrayed as a hero in the novel A Pillar of Iron by Taylor Caldwell (1965). Robert Harris' novels Imperium, Lustrum (published under the name Conspirata in the United States) and Dictator comprise a three-part series based on the life of Cicero. In these novels, Cicero's character is depicted in a more favourable way than in those of McCullough, with his positive traits equaling or outweighing his weaknesses; conversely, Caesar is depicted as more sinister than in McCullough. Cicero is a major recurring character in the Roma Sub Rosa series of mystery novels by Steven Saylor. He also appears several times as a peripheral character in John Maddox Roberts' SPQR series. Samuel Barnett portrays Cicero in a 2017 audio drama series pilot produced by Big Finish Productions. A full series was released the following year. All episodes are written by David Llewellyn, and directed and produced by Scott Handcock.

== See also ==
- Caecilia Attica – Roman woman (58–51 BC – 32–29 BC)
- Caecilia Metella (daughter of Celer) – Daughter of Clodia and Metellus
- Civis romanus sum – Latin phrase meaning "I am a Roman citizen"
- Clausula (rhetoric) – Rhythmic sentence ending used in rhetoric
- A Dialogue Concerning Oratorical Partitions
- E pluribus unum – Traditional motto of the United States
- Esse quam videri – Latin phrase: "To be rather than to seem"
- Ipse dixit – Assertion without proof
- List of ancient Romans
- Lorem ipsum – Placeholder text used in publishing and graphic design
- Marcantonius Majoragio – Italian philosopher (1514–1555)
- Marcus Tullius Tiro – Secretary and personal assistant to Marcus Tullius Cicero
- Marius Nizolius – Italian humanist (1498–1576)
- Otium – Leisure time in ancient Roman culture
- Socratici viri – Latin idiom for "Socrates' men" or "disciples of Socrates"
- Tempest in a teapot – English idiom
- Translation – Transfer of the meaning of something in one language into another

== Notes ==
Political offices
| Preceded by L. Julius Caesar; C. Marcius Figulus | Roman consul 63 BC; With: C. Antonius Hybrida | Succeeded by D. Junius Silanus; L. Licinius Murena |
