= Terentia =

Wife of Cicero

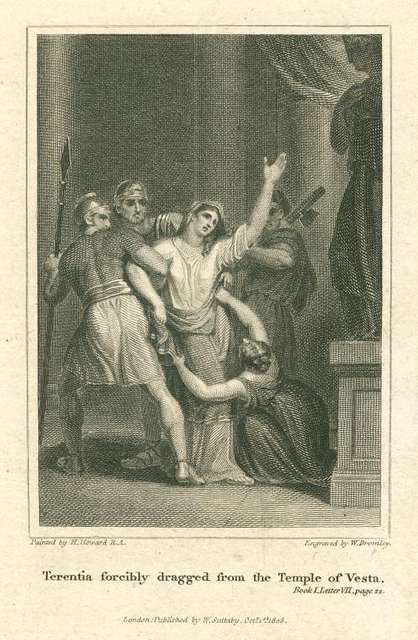
- Terentia being dragged from the Temple of Vesta
- Born: 98 BC
- Died: 6 AD (aged 102–103)
- Known for: Being the wife (and ex-wife) of Cicero
- Spouse: Cicero
- Children: Tulliola; Cicero Minor

Terentia (/təˈrɛnʃiə, -ʃə/; 98 BC – AD 6) was the first wife of the orator Marcus Tullius Cicero. She was instrumental in Cicero's political life both as a benefactor and as a fervent activist for his cause.

== Family background ==
Terentia was born into a wealthy plebeian family by the name of Terentius. She may have been a daughter of the Terentii Varrones, who were the most important senatorial branch of that family. This is suggested by the fact that Cicero had a cousin with the cognomen Varro and a friend by the name of Marcus Terentius Varro. This Varro owned a house near Arpinum not far from Cicero's own birthplace. Therefore, if Terentia was indeed the daughter of a Varro, Cicero's links to this family may have influenced his marriage to Terentia.

Terentia had one half-sister named Fabia, who was a Vestal Virgin and the daughter of a patrician named Fabius. If Terentia's mother married the plebeian Terentius first, then Terentia was the older sister and probably the sole inheritor of her father's estate. Upon her father's death, Terentia became very wealthy.

She was endowed with a huge dowry, which included at least two blocks of tenement apartments in Rome, a plot of woods in the suburbs of Rome, and a large farm. The apartments and farm generated a considerable annual income. There is evidence that Terentia had much land in her own name. In addition to the public land she possessed, Terentia acquired a large woodland property among many other investments. She also owned a village which she intended to sell in the crisis of Cicero's exile.

Her total dowry was 400,000 sesterces, which was the exact amount needed for a man to run for senator. Since Cicero was still under the authority of his father, the paterfamilias, he had not yet inherited anything. Therefore, Terentia's dowry was probably used to finance his political career.

== Marriage, family life, and children ==
Terentia was around 18 years old when she married Cicero in 80 or 79 BC. Besides the connections between Cicero and the Terentii, Terentia probably married him because Cicero was an up-and-coming novus homo (new man) with a promising political career. She married Cicero in a sine manu marriage (see manus marriage), bringing with her the dowry and her private property. While the dowry passed into the control of Cicero's paterfamilias and later to Cicero himself, Terentia herself conducted the affairs of her private property with the aid of her guardian Philotimus.

Terentia was responsible for conducting family affairs as well. Besides assigning slaves to complete tasks such as weaving and cooking, Terentia was serious about making offerings to the gods and demonstrating proper piety. Cicero refers to her regular worship in several correspondences; in one letter he describes her piety as an act of pure devotion. In another, Cicero jokes that Terentia should sacrifice to the god that made him ill enough to expel his anxiety. Cicero's jest indicates that he left much of these household responsibilities in the hands of his wife. She was also involved in supporting important relations with Cicero's friends and family. In 68, Cicero and Terentia invited Cicero's brother Quintus Tullius Cicero and his new wife Pomponia (a sister to Cicero's friend Atticus) in order to improve and solidify the marriage. In a letter of that time, Cicero writes that Terentia is just as devoted to Atticus and his family as Cicero is.

Tullia, the daughter of Terentia and Cicero, was born in 78 BC. Since at this time they had already been married for two years without children, it is likely that the couple was not very fertile. Their son Marcus Tullius Cicero Minor was not born until 65 BC. Lack of fertility is also suggested by the fact that Tullia herself had problems conceiving children later in life.

In 51, when Cicero departed for his proconsulship in Cilicia, Tullia was unmarried and in need of a third husband. Since Cicero could not make a match for her except through letters, Terentia was instrumental in finding a suitable husband for Tullia. Cicero himself writes that he allowed the pair to make the decision without his further approval. Therefore, Cicero must have given his consent for a marriage in advance, for a Roman citizen could not get married without the approval of the paterfamilias. Terentia was also responsible for paying Publius Cornelius Dolabella the second installment of Tullia's dowry in 48 BC, when Cicero was having financial trouble.

Since Cicero was a Pompeian and Dolabella a Caesarian, any decisive news of the civil war meant that the situation was getting worse for one of them. Terentia and Tullia had a strong relationship that helped them persevere through the tumultuous time of the civil war.

== Cicero's exile and family crisis ==
In 58 BC, Cicero was exiled from Rome for the allegedly illegal execution of Roman citizens in the Catilinarian conspiracy. Publius Clodius Pulcher enacted the bill with the purpose of getting revenge on Cicero for the fact that he had nullified Clodius' alibi in the Bona Dea affair. Plutarch, in his Parallel Lives, tells us that Cicero was compelled to testify against Clodius by Terentia, in order to prove that he was not having an affair with Clodia (Clodius' sister). However, this story is most likely conceived either by Plutarch himself or a slanderer of Cicero. Plutarch's intentions were to show Terentia as an oppressive wife and thus to show Cicero as a weak man under the control of his wife.

Upon his exile, Cicero left his estate in chaos. Terentia was thus left in charge of the affairs concerning Cicero's houses, villas, revenues, and his slaves. The responsibility of Cicero Minor's upbringing, the welfare of the household, and the safety of Tullia also fell to Terentia. She continued to act as a wife to Cicero even though his exile legally ended their marriage.

Both Tullia and Terentia protested against the exile publicly. They wore their hair unkempt and put on black mourning clothes. In this fashion they visited the houses of their friends in Rome in order to gain sympathy and support for Cicero's return. After Cicero's house on the Palatine Hill was burned down by Clodius' mob, Terentia took refuge in the house of the Vestal Virgins. Although she may have also stayed at the home of Tullia's husband Piso, it is likely that Terentia spent the entire duration of Cicero's exile living with Fabia and the Vestals.

During this time, Cicero himself was depressed and at times suicidal. He writes that he is wretched and that he should no longer live. He asks frequently what he should do and despairs that he cannot ask Terentia to come to him for she is an exhausted woman; meanwhile, Terentia was very busy with her efforts to arrange Cicero's return to Rome.

In an earlier letter, Cicero commends Terentia's relentless courage and fortitude. He says that he has heard how active Terentia is from many of his friends. This indicates that Terentia was able to rally widespread support on behalf of Cicero. Furthermore, Cicero reassures Terentia that he has given proper thanks to those who she has told him to recognize because they have helped her. This shows that Terentia was not only keeping Cicero up to date on her progress, but she was also delegating him a role to play in the whole effort. Cicero admits that the hope of his return depends on Terentia and so he worries for her health and ability to take on her many labours.

However, Terentia did not reveal the worst details to Cicero, probably so as not to encourage his depression. He found out from P. Valerius that Terentia was dragged from the Temple of Vesta to the Valerian Bank. Terentia may have also suffered physical abuse in this incident, as indicated by Cicero's later orations.

Thus, even though others such as Atticus, Tullia, Piso and Quintus were also lobbying for Cicero's return, Terentia was one of the most fervent activists in the crisis. Cicero was able to return to Rome in 57 BC.

== Civil war and divorce ==
At the beginning of the civil war between Julius Caesar and Pompeius Magnus in 49 BC, both Terentia and Tullia remained at the Palatine house (which was already rebuilt). Tullia was pregnant at the time and she stayed with her mother because her third husband Dolabella had gone to join Caesar. It was up to Terentia and Tullia to decide whether or not they would remain in Rome during the war, even though Cicero worried about their safety.

During the remainder of 49 and much of 48 BC, Terentia was once again responsible for managing the family's finances. However, now Cicero was displeased with the way she was handling things and he was especially critical of Philotimus' work. In Life of Cicero, Plutarch tells us that Terentia was at fault for the lack of funds that Cicero required to pay for his journey. Although Plutarch was hostile to the record of Terentia, his account supports a letter by Cicero in which he may be blaming Terentia - someone "he has trusted too much".

Their time apart and the strained atmosphere of the civil war caused the letters of Terentia and Cicero to become increasingly emotionless and reserved. While Cicero was staying in Brundisium, he often found time to write to Terentia. However, his letters were terse and ineloquent, which was unlike most letters between the two. The pair had further disagreement over Terentia's will in 47 BC, specifically about what should be left to their children. At the same time, Tullia's marriage to Dolabella was going badly as his infidelity and neglect of her became more prominent. Cicero avoids blaming Terentia for making the match in the first place (despite Cicero's misgivings at the time), but it is clear that he wishes the decision had been made differently. Despite the lack of affectionate feelings and the growing resentment and suspicion of Terentia, Cicero continued to trust her with the administration of their household.

The strain on their marriage led to divorce in 47 or 46 BC. Terentia was around 52 years old at the time. According to Jerome of Stridon, Terentia later remarried two times, her second husband being the historian Sallust and her third the writer and general Marcus Valerius Messala Corvinus. But Jerome lived much later, in the fourth century AD, and his assertions are not confirmed by any other ancient writer. Prominent scholars of Roman prosopography such as Ronald Syme refute the possibility of those two marriages (for instance, both actual wives of Messala Corvinus are known). Susan Treggiari has pointed out that the later historian may have confused Terentia with Cicero's second wife Publilia. Very little is known about Terentia after her divorce from Cicero. She outlived her ex-husband by many years, dying at the age of 103 in 6 AD.
