= John Adams (shoemaker) =

American shoemaker, veteran and centenarian (1745–1849)

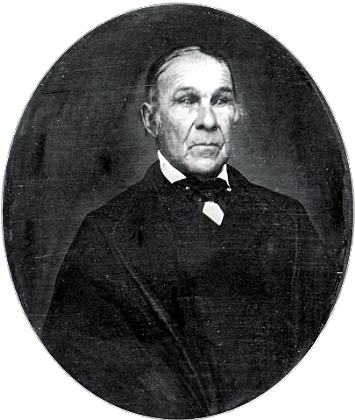
- Adams in 1845
- Born: February 1, 1745 [O.S. January 21, 1744] Worcester, Province of Massachusetts Bay
- Died: March 26, 1849 (aged 104) (Note: Some sources list his date of death as February 26, 1849.); Harford, Pennsylvania, U.S.
- Occupation: Shoemaker
- Known for: Candidate for being the earliest-born person ever photographed alive
- Spouse: Joanna Munroe (m. 1770; died 1822) Lucy Simonds Munroe (m. 1826)
- Children: 9

John Adams (February 1, 1745 [O.S. January 21, 1744] – March 26, 1849) was an American master craftsman, house builder, farmer, civic official, veteran of the American Revolution, and celebrated centenarian who is widely recognized as one of the earliest-born people to have been photographed alive. While he sustained a life-long trade as a shoemaker, he was also a prominent early builder in Worcester County, responsible for constructing historic timber-framed homes in Ashburnham, Massachusetts, including the 1798 Federal-style house on Russell Hill Road, as well as contributing to other early structures within the Cambridge Grant Historic District While not to be confused with either of the U.S. Presidents who share his name, John Adams and John Quincy Adams, he is a third cousin once removed with President John Adams through Henry Adams as a common ancestor, making John Quincy Adams his third cousin twice removed.

== Biography ==
John Adams was born on February 1, 1745 [O.S. January 21, 1744], in Worcester, then part of the Province of Massachusetts Bay, to Captain Thomas Adams and Lydia Chadwick. John Adams was a descendant of the prominent Deacon Joseph Adams line of Menotomy (present-day Arlington, Massachusetts). His family also owned and operated the historic Black Horse Tavern in Menotomy, a notable meeting place for the Committee of Safety and Supplies in the days leading up to the Battles of Lexington and Concord. He pioneered, on his own, from Menotomy to Ashburnham, Massachusetts in 1766, bringing his wife there, from Lexington, to marry in 1770. Adams became a permanent resident and lived there for over 60 years. He was frequently elected as a selectman and assessor. In addition to his building work, Adams maintained a diversified homestead in Ashburnham. He operated a family tanning business and raised sheep, utilizing the hides and wool to produce specialized leather goods, such as handmade purses, alongside his primary trade as a shoemaker. He married Joanna Munroe on July 9, 1770, in Lexington, Massachusetts. Joanna was the sister of Ebenezer Munroe, a fellow Continental soldier noted for firing one of the first shots at Lexington Green at the onset of the American Revolution in 1775. They were married for fifty-two years and had nine children. After her death in 1822, Adams married Lucy Simonds Munroe, the widow of Ebenezer Munroe.

Adams fought in the Continental Army during the American Revolution. He enlisted in Whitcomb's Regiment for 10 days, shortly after the Battles of Lexington and Concord on April 19, 1775. On July 6, 1780, Adams received a commission as a lieutenant in the 8th Worcester County Militia, where he served in Captain Francis Lane's company. Adams never applied for a pension.

Adams was also the uncle of Isaac Hill, the Governor of New Hampshire and a prominent nineteenth-century journalist. In Adams' later years, Governor Hill published many of his uncle's original missives and historical recollections in his periodical, The Farmer's Monthly Visitor, preserving Adams' firsthand accounts of his pioneering land as a young man in Ashburnham and the early American republic. Within these pages, Adams was celebrated as a passionate farmer and steward of the land, using his personal agrarian philosophy to promote the dignity of manual labor and democratic values.

Adams moved to Harford, Pennsylvania at age 94 where his son James lived. On the occasion of his 100th birthday, Adams returned to Ashburnham and posed for a daguerreotype portrait, making him possibly the earliest-born person to have been photographed alive. His date of birth surpasses that of Conrad Heyer, who is often credited as the earliest-born living person photographed. However, there are photographs of others who claimed to have been born earlier, including Baltus Stone, a veteran of the American revolution whose date of birth is given as between 1743 and 1754; Caesar, an enslaved man allegedly born in 1737; and a man named John Owen, supposedly born in 1735 or 1741.

According to local accounts, Adams's hearing was perfect until two years before his death, and he could read without eyeglasses. He supported himself as a shoemaker the last ten years of his life and in his last year, he made a pair of shoes for himself. The daguerreotype and the fascinating history of his life and craftsmanship are housed at the Susquehanna County Historical Society in Montrose, PA. He died on March 26, 1849, aged 104, in Harford.
