= Cicero Minor =

Roman consul in 30 BC, son of Cicero

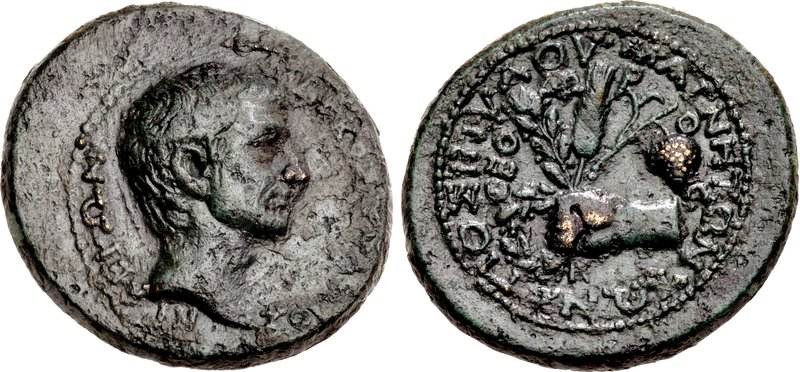
Provincial coin minted by Cicero Minor (portrayed) in Magnesia ad Sipylum while serving as proconsul of Asia in the first half of the 20s BC.

Marcus Tullius Cicero minor (minor, 'younger'), or Cicero the Younger, was born in 65 BC. He was the son of the distinguished orator and statesman Marcus Tullius Cicero and his first wife, Terentia. Cicero minor had an elder sister, Tullia, who was born in 79 and died in 45 BC.

== Biography ==
In youth, apparently despairing over his father's exile to Greece in 58 BC, by 52 BC he had joined his father during his governorship in Cilicia. During his time in Cilicia he served as envoy to Deiotarus, king of Galatia, and returned to Italy with his father in 51 BC. In March 49 BC amid the start of Caesar's civil war his father gave him the toga virilis at Arpinum. When his father took Pompey's side in mid-49 BC, Cicero minor followed him to Greece and served as officer of a cavalry detachment. After Pompey's defeat at Pharsalus in 48 BC, Cicero minor with his father was pardoned at Brundisium. The next year he was made one of the three municipal aediles at Arpinum with his cousin and one Marcus Casius as colleagues.

During Caesar's Spanish campaign, Cicero minor asked his father for leave to join Caesar's troops in late 46 BC. However, Cicero minor evidently stayed at Rome, since by March 45 BC he was planning to go to Athens for studies. While he was at Athens he wrote a letter to Tiro, a former slave, now freedman, of the family. In it, he said that he was practising declamation in Greek with Gorgias but had to let him go, because his father, whom he did not want to offend, had told him to. Cicero minor was then taught declamation in Greek by Cassius and Latin with Brutus, the two leading conspirators in the assassination of Julius Caesar who, their deed complete, were in Greece trying to gain support for the war against the Second Triumvirate. Brutus praised Cicero and admired him for his noble spirit and his detestation of tyranny. During his time in Athens, Brutus gave Cicero command and used his services in a number of successful undertakings.

While his father was in Rome leading the senate during the War of Mutina, he sought to advance Cicero minor to the College of Pontiffs. However, after the senate's defeat, both father and son were proscribed by the Second Triumvirate at Mark Antony's request in late 43 BC. After his father was killed in those proscriptions that December, Cicero joined the liberatores led by Brutus and Cassius. After the republican defeat at the Battle of Philippi in 42 BC, Cicero minor fled to Sextus Pompey in Sicily. He stayed with Sextus until the Pact of Misenum in 39 BC, when Cicero minor returned to Rome. Graciously received by Octavian, he was quickly advanced to a priesthood (either the augurate or pontificate).

Made one of the suffect consuls for 30 BC at Octavian's initiative, Cicero minor announced Antony's death to the senate and people. The appointment was one of political theatre, allowing Octavian to present himself as having defeated an internal enemy of Rome (as the elder Cicero had done with the Catilinarian conspiracy), to distance himself from the crimes of the Second Triumvirate, and to conjure the romantic image of a son avenging his father's murder. Cicero minor had the senate revoke Antony's honours and tear his statues down, as well as decree that no Antonii would bear the name Marcus again. "Thus the heavenly powers devolved upon the family of Cicero the final steps in the punishment of Antony". After his consulship, he was proconsular governor of Asia. In 28 BC, he then served as legate to the imperial province of Syria.

== Legacy ==
Later remembered as an alcoholic, Pliny, in Naturalis Historia recounts a story where in a drunken stupor Cicero minor threw a goblet at Marcus Vipsanius Agrippa. Seneca the Elder, in Suasoriae, said that the younger had "none of his father's ability except his wit" and that he "was not gifted with a good memory, and drunkenness was gradually destroying any that he had".

He is not known to have had any children.

== Bibliography ==
- Balsdon, J P V D; Griffin, M T (2012). "Tullius Cicero, Marcus, son of Cicero the orator". Oxford Classical Dictionary (4th ed.). doi:10.1093/acrefore/9780199381135.013.6598. ISBN 978-0-19-938113-5.
- Broughton, Thomas Robert Shannon (1952). The magistrates of the Roman republic. Vol. 2. New York: American Philological Association.
- Burnett, Andrew; Michel Amandry & Pere Pau Ripollès (1992). Roman Provincial Coinage volume I: From the death of Caesar to the death of Vitellius (44 BC–AD 69); Part I: Introduction and Catalogue. London: British Museum Press. ISBN 0-7141-0871-5.
- Hanslik, Rudolf (1943). "Tullius 30" . Realencyclopädie der classischen Altertumswissenschaft (in German). Vol. VII A, 2. Stuttgart: Butcher. cols. 1281–86 – via Wikisource.
- "M. Tullius Cicero". Prosopographia Imperii Romani (in Latin). Vol. 3 (1st ed.). Berlin: G Reimer. 1898. pp. 338–40.
- Zmeskal, Klaus (2009). Adfinitas (in German). Vol. 1. Passau: Verlag Karl Stutz. ISBN 978-3-88849-304-1.

Political offices
Preceded by Gaius Antistius Vetus as suffect	Roman consul (suffect); 30 BC with Octavian IV	Succeeded by Lucius Saenius as suffect
