= Attica (wife of Agrippa) =

Roman woman (58–51 BC – 32–29 BC)

- Born: Pomponia (possibly); 58–51 BC; Rome
- Died: Possibly 32–29 BC
- Spouse: Marcus Vipsanius Agrippa
- Children: Vipsania Agrippina; Vipsania
- Parents: Titus Pomponius Atticus (father); Pilia (mother)

Attica (Note: She was possibly born with the name Pomponia Attica, but was known after her father's adoption as Caecilia Attica. The combined forms Pomponia Caecilia Attica or Caecilia Pomponia Attica have also been used.) (c. 58–51 BC – c. 32–29 BC) was the daughter of Cicero's Epicurean friend Titus Pomponius Atticus. She was also the first wife of Marcus Vipsanius Agrippa, close friend of the emperor Augustus.

== Early life ==
Attica is generally held to have been born in 51 BC but some historians have argued for earlier dates, E. F. Leon proposed 55 BC, which was accepted by Meyer Reinhold and Stephen V. F. Waite while D. R. Shackleton Bailey dated Cicero's letter where he mentions her recent birth to 58 BC.

Her mother, Pilia (born before 75 BC), daughter of Pilius, was a maternal granddaughter of Marcus Licinius Crassus, a member of the First Triumvirate. Her father Atticus and Pilia were married circa 58–56 BC, when Atticus was already 53 or 54 years old. Her mother died after 12 years of marriage in 46 BC.

== Name ==
Attica's father Titus Pomponius Atticus was at a relatively advanced age adopted by his maternal uncle, Quintus Caecilius, (Note: Around 58 BC.) this meant according to the Roman custom that his name changed to Quintus Caecilius Pomponianus Atticus; Attica is presumed to have been born after this and thus known as "Caecilia", but she has frequently been referred to as "Pomponia". She was often called by the diminutive name "Atticula" by her father's friend Cicero.

== Relationship to Cicero ==
Attica is several times mentioned in the letters between her father and Cicero. Cicero was very fond of this little girl, whom he would never see growing into an adult as he was murdered in 43 BC. He gave her the pet name Attica, the feminine equivalent to her father's cognomen Atticus. In his letters to Atticus Cicero often sent greetings to her, and often asked if she had one of her bouts of high fever that caused distress to him. In one letter in the beginning of the 40s BC Cicero tells him not to reprimand Attica, who was sulking and angry at Cicero. He said that she was quite right in insisting that Cicero on his last visit had not said goodbye to her properly.

== Education ==
Attica was given a broad literary education. Her education started at the early age of five or six. Her father procured her a private tutor named Quintus Caecilius Epirota, one of his freedmen. Epirota was eventually accused of being inappropriate with Attica and was banished.

== Marriage and children ==
Attica became Marcus Vipsanius Agrippa's first wife. Agrippa was the right-hand man and trusted friend of Octavian (the future emperor Augustus). The two were childhood friends and had studied together in Apollonia, Illyria (modern Albania) before Julius Caesar had adopted Octavian. This made the match a very fortunate one for Attica. Cornelius Nepos states that it was Mark Antony who arranged the marriage for the couple. Nepos also notes that while Agrippa had the opportunity to marry into the nobility, he preferred to wed an equestrian.

It is uncertain when the marriage took place and the betrothal may have been decided on as early as 42 BC. Ronald Syme held that the marriage likely took place around 37 BC.

Attica's and Agrippa's daughter Vipsania Agrippina was born around 36 BC, she was engaged at only a year old to the future emperor Tiberius. It is possible that she and Agrippa had another daughter who was married to Quintus Haterius.

== Later life and death ==
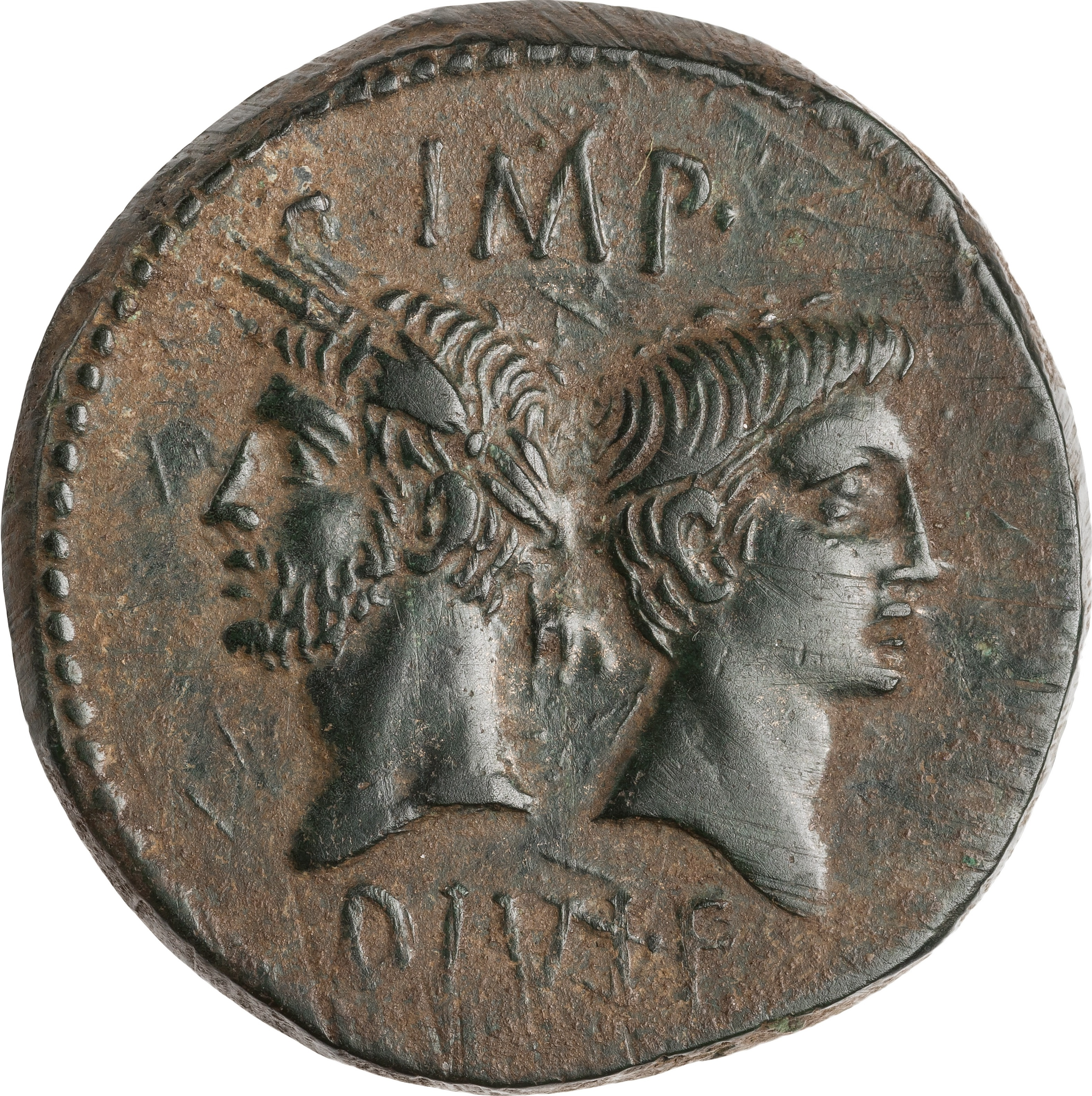
This coin from Nimes of Agrippa (left) and Octavian (right) which was minted to celebrate their defeat of Antony and Cleopatra (30 BC) depicts Agrippa with a beard, a sign of mourning, this has been interpreted by some historians to indicate that Attica had died around this time.

Around 28 BC Agrippa married for the second time to Octavian's niece Claudia Marcella Major, it is unknown what became of Attica, historians have speculated that she may have died before this or that Agrippa divorced her.

Some historians have postulated that it is possible that Agrippa brought up the earlier incident of potential intimacy with her teacher Epirota from her youth as an excuse to divorce her if he wished to marry someone closer to Octavian. Gail Hamilton argued against this speculation, reasoning that Agrippa's closeness with Attica's father would make it unlikely that he would sacrifice his wife to slander. Luigi Cantarelli pointed out that Seutonius did not indicate that Attica was in any way to blame for Epirota's actions, which Reinhold observes is true. Reinhold as well noted that Agrippa was greatly attached to Atticus. Agrippa continued to support and elevate members of Attica's birth family the Pomponii in places like Butrint (where a statue of Attica may have stood) during Augustus reign.

Cantarelli has argued that it is possible that Attica was no longer alive in 32 BC because she is not mentioned by Nepos among those called to her father's deathbed. E. Rapp believed that coins from Nemausus which depict Agrippa with a beard (a sign of public mourning in Roman culture) indicate that she died in 29 BC since the coin celebrates Agrippa's victory over Antony and Cleopatra which was in 30 BC. Reinhold agreed that the coins could be an indication of Agrippa's mourning after a death, but rejected Rapp's dating of them to 29 BC.

== See also ==
- Caecilia gens
- Pomponia gens
