= Pomponia gens =

Ancient Roman family

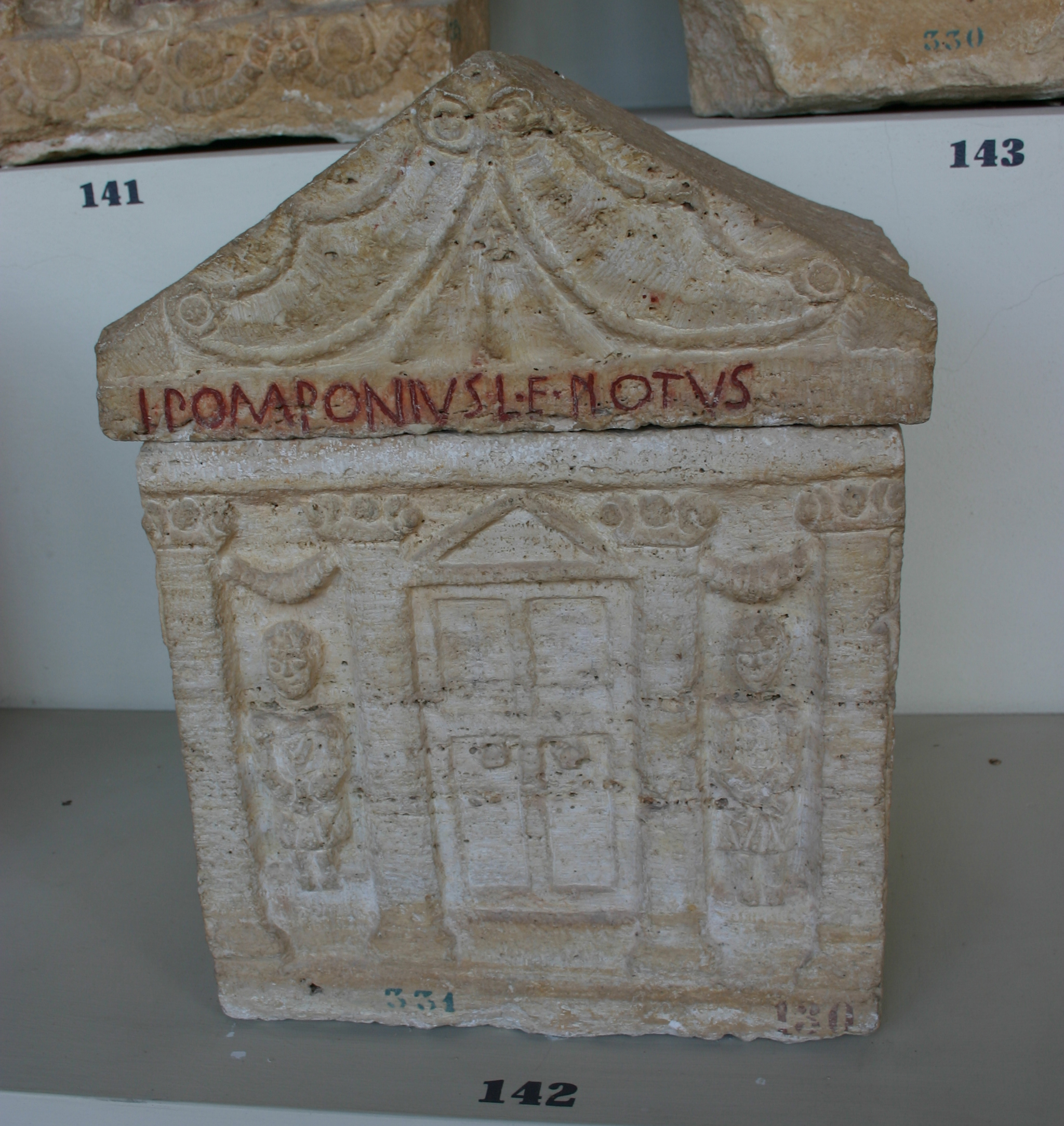
Etruscan urn containing the ashes of Pomponius Notus

The gens Pomponia was a plebeian family at ancient Rome. Its members appear throughout the history of the Roman Republic, and into imperial times. The first of the gens to achieve prominence was Marcus Pomponius, tribune of the plebs in 449 BC; the first who obtained the consulship was Manius Pomponius Matho in 233 BC.

== Origin ==
In the latter part of the Republic, it was common for various gentes to claim descent from the founding figures of Rome; the companions of Aeneas, Romulus, or those who came to Rome in the time of the kings. The Pomponii claimed to be descended from Pompo, one of the sons of Numa Pompilius, the second King of Rome, whose image appears on some of their coins. Several other gentes also claimed Numa as their ancestor. (Note: The gentes which are known to have claimed descent from Numa were the Aemilii, Calpurnii, Pinarii, and Pomponii, by sons named Mamercus, Calpus, Pinus, and Pompo, respectively; and, through a daughter, Pompilia, the Marcii.)

Pompo, asserted as the name of the ancestor of the Pompilii, does indeed appear to have been an ancient praenomen of Sabine origin. It was the Oscan equivalent of Quintus, a very common name. Numa's father is said to have been named Pompo Pompilius, and it is evident that the nomen Pompilius was itself a patronymic surname derived from Pompo. Pomponius appears to be derived from an adjectival form of that name, and the equivalent of the Latin nomen Quinctilius. Thus, it is reasonably certain that some ancestor of the Pomponii was indeed named Pompo, although the claim that he was the son of Numa may well be a later addition.

An alternative explanation suggested during the early nineteenth century, was that the name might be derived from an Etruscan root, Pumpu or Pumpili. In her History of Etruria, Mrs. Hamilton Gray supposed Pumpu to have been the name of Numa's mother, adopted as a surname according to a tradition common to the Etruscan and Sabine cultures.

== Praenomina ==
The Pomponii used a wide variety of praenomina. The principal names were Marcus, Lucius, and Titus. A few of the Pomponii bore the praenomina Quintus, Publius, and Sextus. The illustrious family of the Pomponii Mathones favored Manius, and there are individual instances of Gaius and Gnaeus.

== Branches and cognomina ==
In the earliest times, the Pomponii were not distinguished by any surname, and the only family that rose to importance in the time of the Republic bore the surname Matho. On coins we also find the cognomina Molo, Musa, and Rufus, but none of these occur in ancient writers. The other surnames found during the Republic, such as Atticus, were personal cognomina. Numerous surnames appear in imperial times.

== Members ==
This list includes abbreviated praenomina. For an explanation of this practice, see filiation.

=== Early Pomponii ===
- Marcus Pomponius, tribune of the plebs in 449 BC.
- Marcus Pomponius, tribunus plebis in 362 BC, brought an accusation against Lucius Manlius Capitolinus, the dictator of the preceding year, but withdrew it after being threatened by the dictator's son, Titus Manlius Torquatus.

=== Pomponii Rufi ===
- Lucius Pomponius Rufus, grandfather of the consular tribune of 399 BC.
- Lucius Pomponius L. f. Rufus, father of the consular tribune.
- Marcus Pomponius L. f. L. n. Rufus, consular tribune in 399 BC.
- Quintus Pomponius (L. f. L. n. Rufus), tribune of the plebs in 395 BC, opposed a measure to establish a colony at Veii, for which reason he was accused and fined two years later.

=== Pomponii Mathones ===
- Manius Pomponius Matho, grandfather of the consul of 233 BC.
- Manius Pomponius M'. n. Matho, father of the consul of 233 BC.
- Manius Pomponius M'. f. M'. n. Matho, consul in 233 BC.
- Marcus Pomponius M'. f. M'. n. Matho, consul in 231 BC.
- Marcus Pomponius (M. f. M'. n.) Matho, praetor in 204 BC.
- Pomponia M'. f. M'. n., the daughter of Manius Pomponius Matho, consul in 233 BC, was the wife of Publius Cornelius Scipio, and mother of Scipio Africanus.

=== Pomponii Bassi ===
- Titus Pomponius Bassus, consul suffectus in AD 94.
- Lucius Pomponius Bassus, consul suffectus in AD 118.
- Lucius Pomponius L. f. Bassus Cascus Scribonianus, consul suffectus between AD 128 and 143.
- Gaius Pomponius C. f. Bassus Terentianus, consul suffectus around AD 193.
- Pomponius Bassus, consul in AD 211, put to death by Elagabalus, so that the emperor could marry his widow, Annia Faustina.
- Pomponius Bassus, consul in AD 259 and 271; in the latter year, his colleague was the emperor Aurelian.

=== Others ===
==== Republican Pomponii ====
- Sextus Pomponius, legate of the consul Tiberius Sempronius Longus in 218 BC, the first year of the Second Punic War.
- Titus Pomponius Veientanus, a publicanus, who as commander of some of the allied troops in southern Italy in 213 BC, attacked the Carthaginian general Hanno; he was defeated and taken prisoner.
- Marcus Pomponius, praetor urbanus in 161 BC, obtained a decree of the senate, forbidding philosophers and rhetoricians from living at Rome.
- Marcus Pomponius, an intimate friend of Gaius Gracchus, who sacrificed himself to afford Gracchus to escape his pursuers on the day of his death, in 121 BC.
- Lucius Pomponius Bononiensis, a playwright of the early first century BC.
- Marcus Pomponius, aedile in 82 BC, exhibited scenic games, in which the dancer Galeria Copiola appeared, at the age of 13 or 14.
- Gnaeus Pomponius, an orator of some repute, and tribune of the plebs in 90 BC, was put to death by Sulla.
- Marcus Pomponius, the name erroneously assigned by Plutarch to Marcus Pompeius, commander of the cavalry under Lucullus during the Third Mithridatic War.
- Marcus Pomponius, legate of Gnaeus Pompeius during the war against the pirates in 67 BC; he was assigned to keep watch over the Ligurian Sea and the sinus Gallicus.
- Titus Pomponius, father of Atticus, a man of learning, who, being possessed of considerable property, gave his son a liberal education.
- Titus Pomponius T. f. Atticus, an eques, moneylender, and friend of Cicero.
- Pomponia T. f., married Quintus Tullius Cicero.
- Pomponia T. f. T. n., married Marcus Vipsanius Agrippa, and became the mother of Vipsania Agrippina, the first wife of Tiberius.
- Marcus Pomponius Dionysius, a freedman of Titus Pomponius Atticus.
- Quintus Pomponius Musa, triumvir monetalis circa 66 BC.
- Publius Pomponius, a companion of Publius Clodius Pulcher at the time of his death, in 52 BC.
- Marcus Pomponius, commanded Caesar's fleet at Messana; the greater part of the fleet was burnt by Gaius Cassius Longinus during the Civil War, in 48 BC.
- Pomponius, proscribed by the triumvirs in 43 BC, he escaped Rome disguised as a Praetor, accompanied by slaves playing the part of lictors.

==== Pomponii of imperial times ====
- Publius Pomponius Graecinus, consul suffectus in AD 16, was a friend of Ovid, and the brother of Lucius Pomponius Flaccus, who was consul the following year.
- Pomponia Graecina, married Aulus Plautius, the first governor of Britannia.
- Lucius Pomponius Flaccus, consul in AD 17, was a friend of Tiberius, and the brother of Publius Pomponius Graecinus, who had been consul the preceding year.
- Marcus Pomponius Marcellus, a celebrated grammarian and advocate during the reign of Tiberius.
- Pomponius Labeo, governor of Moesia during the reign of Tiberius, he was denounced by the emperor for maladministration, and put an end to his life in AD 34.
- Publius Pomponius Secundus, a celebrated tragedian, consul suffectus in AD 44, later triumphed over the Chatti.
- Quintus Pomponius Secundus, brother of the playwright, consul suffectus in AD 41, joined the revolt of Camillus Scribonianus the following year.
- Pomponius Mela, a geographer, who probably lived during the reign of Claudius.
- Pomponia Decharis, possibly a freedwoman who was buried in the tomb of Eumachia in Pompeii. She was the adoptive mother of Alleius Nigidius Maius, who became one of the towns most admired patrons.
- Gaius Pomponius Pius, consul suffectus in AD 65.
- Gaius Pomponius, consul suffectus in AD 74.
- Quintus Pomponius Rufus, consul suffectus in AD 95.
- Lucius Pomponius Maternus, consul suffectus in AD 97.
- Gaius Pomponius Pius, consul suffectus in AD 98.
- Gaius Pomponius Rufus Acilius Priscus Coelius Sparsus, consul suffectus in AD 98 and proconsul of Africa in 112/113.
- Pomponius Mamilianus, consul suffectus in AD 100.
- Quintus Pomponius Marcellus, consul suffectus in AD 121.
- Lucius Pomponius Silvanus, consul suffectus in AD 121.
- Titus Pomponius Antistianus Funisulanus Vettonianus, consul suffectus in AD 121.
- Quintus Pomponius Maternus, consul suffectus in AD 128.
- Sextus Pomponius, a jurist active during the time of Hadrian.
- Gaius Pomponius Camerinus, consul in AD 138.
- Quintus Pomponius Musa, consul in AD 158.
- Titus Pomponius Proculus Vitrasius Pollio, consul iter in AD 178.
- Pomponius Porphyrion, an important commentator on the poet Quintus Horatius Flaccus.
- Pomponius Faustinianus, governor of Egypt from AD 185 to 187.
- Lucius Pomponius Liberalis, consul suffectus in AD 204.
- Pomponia Rufina, a Vestal Virgin put to death by Caracalla.
- Marcus Pomponius Maecius Probus, consul suffectus in AD 228.
- Pomponius Januarianus, consul in AD 288.

== See also ==
- List of Roman gentes
- Pomponia
- Columbarium of Pomponius Hylas

== Bibliography ==
- Marcus Tullius Cicero, Brutus, De Officiis, De Oratore, Epistulae ad Atticum.
- Gaius Julius Caesar, Commentarii de Bello Civili (Commentaries on the Civil War).
- Titus Livius (Livy), History of Rome.
- Marcus Velleius Paterculus, Compendium of Roman History.
- Valerius Maximus, Factorum ac Dictorum Memorabilium (Memorable Facts and Sayings).
- Quintus Asconius Pedianus, Commentarius in Oratio Ciceronis Pro Milone (Commentary on Cicero's Oration Pro Milone).
- Gaius Plinius Secundus (Pliny the Elder), Naturalis Historia (Natural History).
- Tiberius Catius Silius Italicus, Punica.
- Publius Cornelius Tacitus, Annales.
- Plutarchus, Lives of the Noble Greeks and Romans.
- Gaius Suetonius Tranquillus, De Claris Rhetoribus (On the Eminent Orators), De Illustribus Grammaticis (The Illustrious Grammarians).
- Appianus Alexandrinus (Appian), Bellum Samniticum (History of the Samnite War), Bella Mithridatica (The Mithridatic Wars), Bellum Civile (The Civil War).
- Aulus Gellius, Noctes Atticae (Attic Nights).
- Lucius Cassius Dio Cocceianus (Cassius Dio), Roman History.
- Herodianus, History of the Empire from the Death of Marcus.
- Sextus Aurelius Victor, De Viris Illustribus (On Famous Men).
- Elizabeth Johnstone (Mrs. Hamilton) Gray, The History of Etruria, J. Hatchard and Son, London (1843, 1844, 1868).
- Dictionary of Greek and Roman Biography and Mythology, William Smith, ed., Little, Brown and Company, Boston (1849).
- Karl Otfried Müller, Die Etrusker, Albert Heitz, Stuttgart (1877).
- George Davis Chase, "The Origin of Roman Praenomina", in Harvard Studies in Classical Philology, vol. VIII (1897).
- Herbert A. Grueber, Coins of the Roman Republic in the British Museum, William Clowes and Sons, Ltd., London (1910).
- T. Robert S. Broughton, The Magistrates of the Roman Republic, American Philological Association (1952).
- Michael Grant, Roman Myths (1971).
