= Caesar, Life of a Colossus =

Book by Adrian Goldsworthy

- 1st edition book cover
- Author: Adrian Goldsworthy
- Language: English
- Subject: Julius Caesar
- Genre: Biography
- Set in: Roman Republic and Gaul 1st century BCE
- Publisher: Yale University Press
- Publication date: 2006
- Publication place: USA
- Media type: Print, eBook, audiobook
- Pages: 519
- ISBN: 978-0-300-12048-6
- OCLC: 872017603
- Dewey Decimal: 937/.05092 B
- LC Class: DG261 .G584 2006
- Preceded by: The Complete Roman Army (Thames & Hudson, 2003)
- Followed by: The Fall of the West: The Death of the Roman Superpower (Orion 2009)
- Website: Home page

Caesar, Life of a Colossus is a biography of Julius Caesar written by Adrian Goldsworthy and published in 2006 by Yale University Press. It outlines Caesar's life in the context of the many institutions with which he interacted: "Roman society, the politics of the senate, Gaul (ancient France)" as well as the army of that ancient republic.

Within that framework, during his fifty-six-year lifetime, he fulfilled many roles: "including a fugitive, prisoner, rising politician, army leader, legal advocate, rebel, dictator – perhaps even a god – as well as a husband, father, lover and adulterer. Few fictional heroes have ever done as much as Gaius Julius Caesar."

One underlying structure of this book is to take the reader on a journey that follows "the many gambles, strange turns, and unlikely incidents in Caesar's career." The book is referenced with endnotes and an index, located in the back of the book, showing it is based on ancient scholarly sources. The work of sifting through these sometimes-conflicting sources to tell the story is also part of the narrative.

Additionally, a bibliography of scholarly commentary, published during our more modern age, regarding Julius Caesar and ancient Rome during his lifetime, is also in the back of the book. Hence, although the author has written this book for the lay reader, it is also useful for scholarly study.

== Background ==
Before publishing Caesar, Life of a Colossus Adrian Goldsworthy, the author, wrote two other important books on Roman history: The Complete Roman Army and The Fall of Carthage. He has subsequently written five other books about aspects of life in ancient Rome. The latest one was published in 2018, entitled Hadrian's Wall.

== See also ==
- Julius Caesar: Wikipedia's biography article on this subject
- Roman Republic
- How Rome Fell by Adrian Goldsworthy
- Service in the Roman Army by Roy W Davies

Works related to Julius Caesar at Wikisource

== Scholarly reviews ==
- Chappell, Stephen (December 4, 2009). "Caesar: Life of a Colossus by Adrian Goldsworthy". The Historian. 71 (4). Wiley: 896–898. doi:10.1111/j.1540-6563.2009.00252_52.x. ISSN 1540-6563. JSTOR 24454130. S2CID 144479070.
- Borrowman, Shane (January 3, 2008). "...Caesar: Life of a Colossus by Adrian Goldsworthy". Rhetoric Review. 27 (1). Taylor & Francis: 93–99. doi:10.1080/07350190701738890. ISSN 1532-7981. JSTOR 20176827. S2CID 142943147.
- "Book Review: Caesar, Life of a Colossus". Parameters. 37 (4). The U.S. Army War College. 2007. doi:10.55540/0031-1723.2398. Free PDF download. Scroll down.
