= Pomponia =

Female name for Roman gens Pomponia

Pomponia is the female name for the Pomponia gens of Ancient Rome. This family was one of the oldest families in Rome. Various women bearing this name lived during the Middle and Late Roman Republic and the Roman Empire. The oldest known Pomponia was mother of a famous Roman general; the second and third were related to each other. The relationship between these women, if any, is not known. They descended from Pomponius, the first son of Numa Pompilius, the second King of Rome.

== Pomponia, mother of Scipio Africanus ==
Pomponia (fl. 212 BC) was a Roman woman who lived in the 3rd century BC. She came from a Roman noble family who were of plebeian status, and were prominent knights or equestrians. She was the daughter of the consul Manius Pomponius Matho, consul in 233 BC (who appears to have died in 211 BC), and was married possibly around 237 BC to Publius Cornelius Scipio, second surviving son of the Roman censor Lucius Cornelius Scipio of a prominent patrician family. Her husband later became a general and statesman during the Second Punic War and was killed in battle in Hispania in 211 BC. By her marriage, Pomponia was the mother of at least two sons, the famous Roman general Publius Cornelius Scipio Africanus Major (236 BC-184 BC/183 BC) and Lucius Cornelius Scipio Asiaticus (fl. 183 BC). Livy's brief mention of Pomponia recounts a legend that Scipio was actually a son of Jove after Pomponia had a sexual union with a snake.

== Pomponia, sister of Titus Pomponius Atticus ==
Pomponia was a Roman woman who lived in the first century BC and was an only sister to Cicero’s friend the Roman Knight Titus Pomponius Atticus. She was an aunt to Caecilia Attica and a great-aunt to Vipsania Agrippina (first wife to future Roman Emperor Tiberius).

Cicero through his effective mediation was able to arrange for Pomponia to marry his younger brother Quintus Tullius Cicero. Quintus and Pomponia married in 68 BC. Pomponia bore Quintus a son of the same name.

Quintus and Pomponia had a long unhappy marriage and they constantly quarrelled. Pomponia was a woman of strong character. Their constant quarrelling greatly upset Cicero and he mentioned this in his letters to Atticus. Cicero tried to assist his sister-in-law and his brother to resolve their problems, but Cicero naturally supported his brother.

When the younger Quintus Tullius Cicero grew up, he tried (encouraged by his uncles) to reconcile his parents, but was unsuccessful. Pomponia and the elder Quintus divorced in later 45 BC or early 44 BC.

In December 43 BC, Cicero, Quintus, and Quintus minor were executed on the orders of Roman Triumvir Mark Antony.

As an act of decency, Antony handed over Philologus, a former slave and traitor to Cicero, to Pomponia. According to Plutarch, Pomponia punished Philologus for his treachery with terrible punishments, which included forcing him to cut off pieces of his own flesh, then roasting and eating them.

== Pomponia, mother of Vipsania Agrippina ==
Pomponia Caecilia Attica, usually called Caecilia Attica (born 51 BC), was the daughter of Titus Pomponius Atticus, the first wife of general Marcus Vipsanius Agrippa, and mother of Vipsania Agrippina. She was also the niece of the second Pomponia, sister-in-law of Cicero.

== Pomponia, wife of Aulus Plautius ==
Pomponia Graecina was a Roman woman who lived in the 1st century. She was the wife of Roman General Aulus Plautius, a distant relative of Julia Livia (daughter of Drusus Julius Caesar) and granddaughter of Emperor Tiberius. Famous speculation associates her with early Christianity in Rome, as in the novel and film Quo Vadis?.

== Pomponia, Vestal Virgin under Caracalla ==
Pomponia Rufina was a Vestal Virgin under the Emperor Caracalla (reigned 211–217). Caracalla ordered her death, because she violated her vow of chastity.

== Pomponia, daughter of Annia Aurelia Faustina ==
Pomponia Ummidia was the daughter of Annia Aurelia Faustina and a descendant of the Roman Emperor Marcus Aurelius and the wife of consul Flavius Antiochianus. For her sister-in-law Pomponia Gratidia and her niece Pomponia Bassa, see her brother's article Pomponius Bassus (consul 259 & 271).

== See also ==
- Pomponia gens
