= Faberius =

Private secretary of Julius Caesar

Faberius was one of the private secretaries of the Ancient Roman dictator Julius Caesar (100 BC – 44 BC).

After Caesar's assassination, in 44 BC, Mark Antony turned to the services of Faberius, by whose aid he inserted whatever he chose into the late dictator's papers. A decree of the senate had previously recognized all Caesar's acts, and therefore, valid and binding on the state. By employing one of Caesar's own secretaries, Antony could insert, without danger of detection, whatever he wished into the papers, since the handwriting of Faberius made it difficult to distinguish the genuine from the spurious memoranda.

A man named Faberius, who may be the same person, is also mentioned as a debtor of Cicero in Cicero's letters to Atticus. That Faberius seems to have been a debtor of Cicero's, since Cicero speaks of him as a person from whom a certain sum was due, and should be demanded, in case of the purchase of some gardens in Rome (Horti Drusiani, Lamiani, etc.), which Cicero wished to buy. He was, however, after a time, disposed to be lenient with Faberius. Cicero seems to have been cautious of giving offence to Faberius. If he was indeed Caesar's private secretary, and the transaction between them, as has been supposed, referred to property sold or confiscated during the civil wars, Cicero's reluctance to enforce payment may in 45 BC have been prudent as well as lenient.
