= War of Actium =

War between Mark Antony and Octavian, 32–30 BC

- Part of the Crisis of the Roman Republic
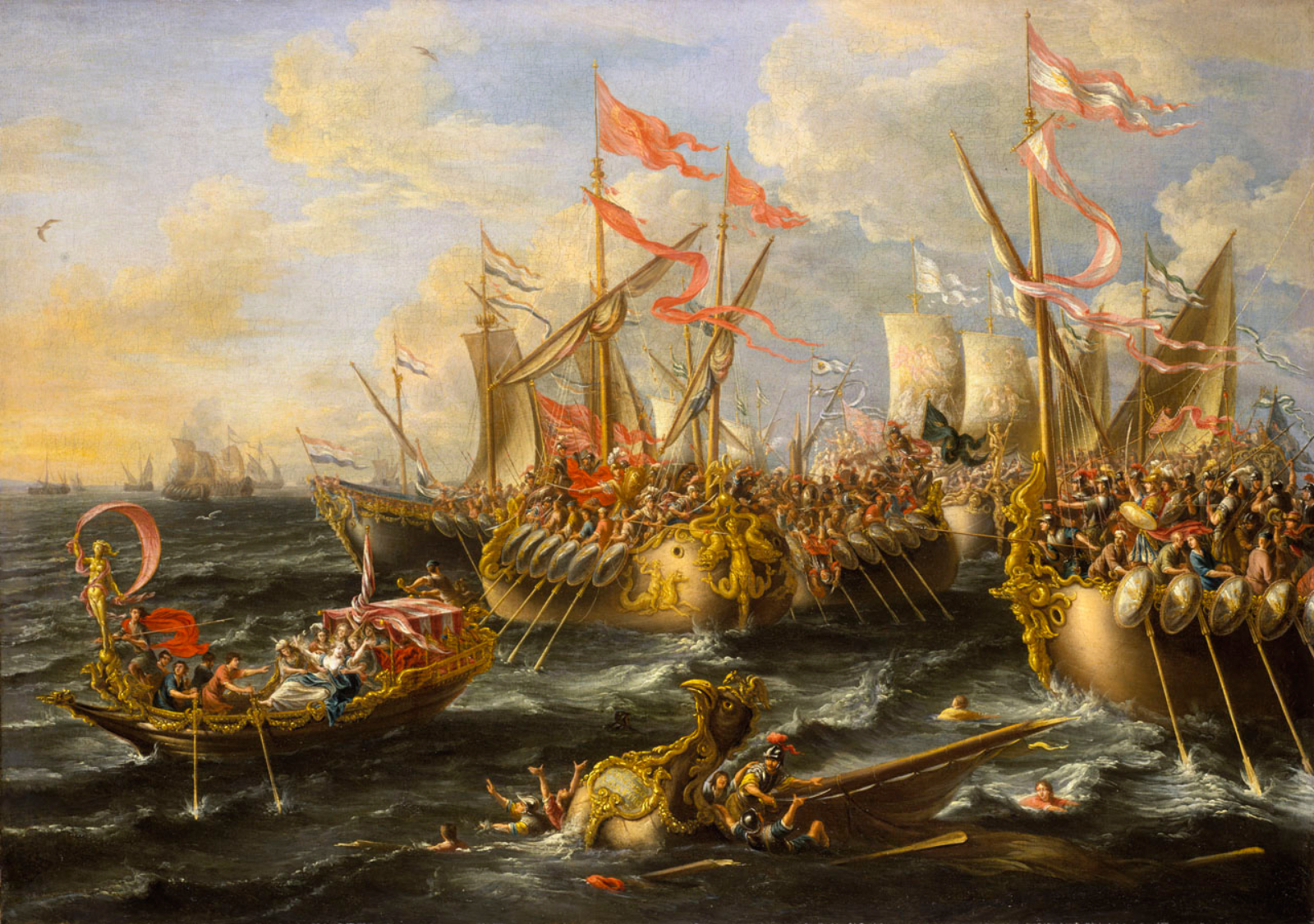
- Anachronistic baroque painting of the Battle of Actium by Laureys a Castro, 1672
Date	March 32 – August 30 BC
Location	Greece and Egypt
Result	Octavian's victory
Territorial changes	Rome annexes Egypt and control over eastern provinces reasserted

Belligerents
Western Roman provinces	Eastern Roman provinces Ptolemaic Egypt

Commanders and leaders
Octavian; Marcus Agrippa; Titus Statilius Taurus; Lucius Pinarius	Mark Antony ‡‡; Cleopatra ‡‡; Gaius Sosius (POW); Publius Canidius Crassus (executed); Bogud †

Strength
200,000 Roman legionaries; 450 Roman warships and transports	173,700 Roman legionaries; 18,000 Ptolemaic soldiers; 5,000 Median reinforcements; 154 Roman and Ptolemaic warships and transports

Casualties and losses
50,000 (Note: Exact figure unknown; at least 50,000 though likely higher.)	75,000 (Note: Exact figure unknown; at least 75,000 though likely higher. All the Roman troops either changed loyalty to Octavian or were taken hostage with most of Antony's fleet destroyed in battle.)

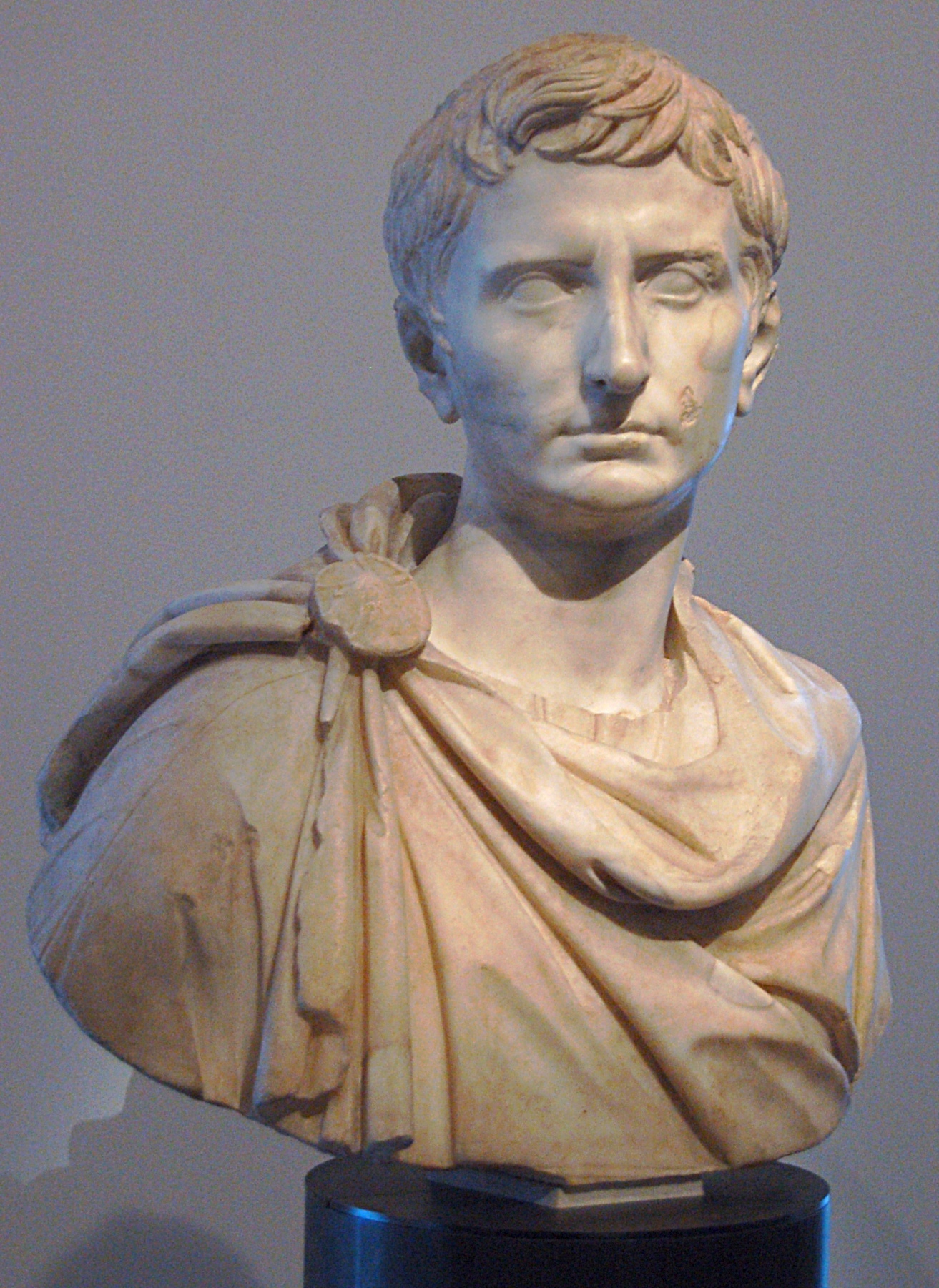
Octavian

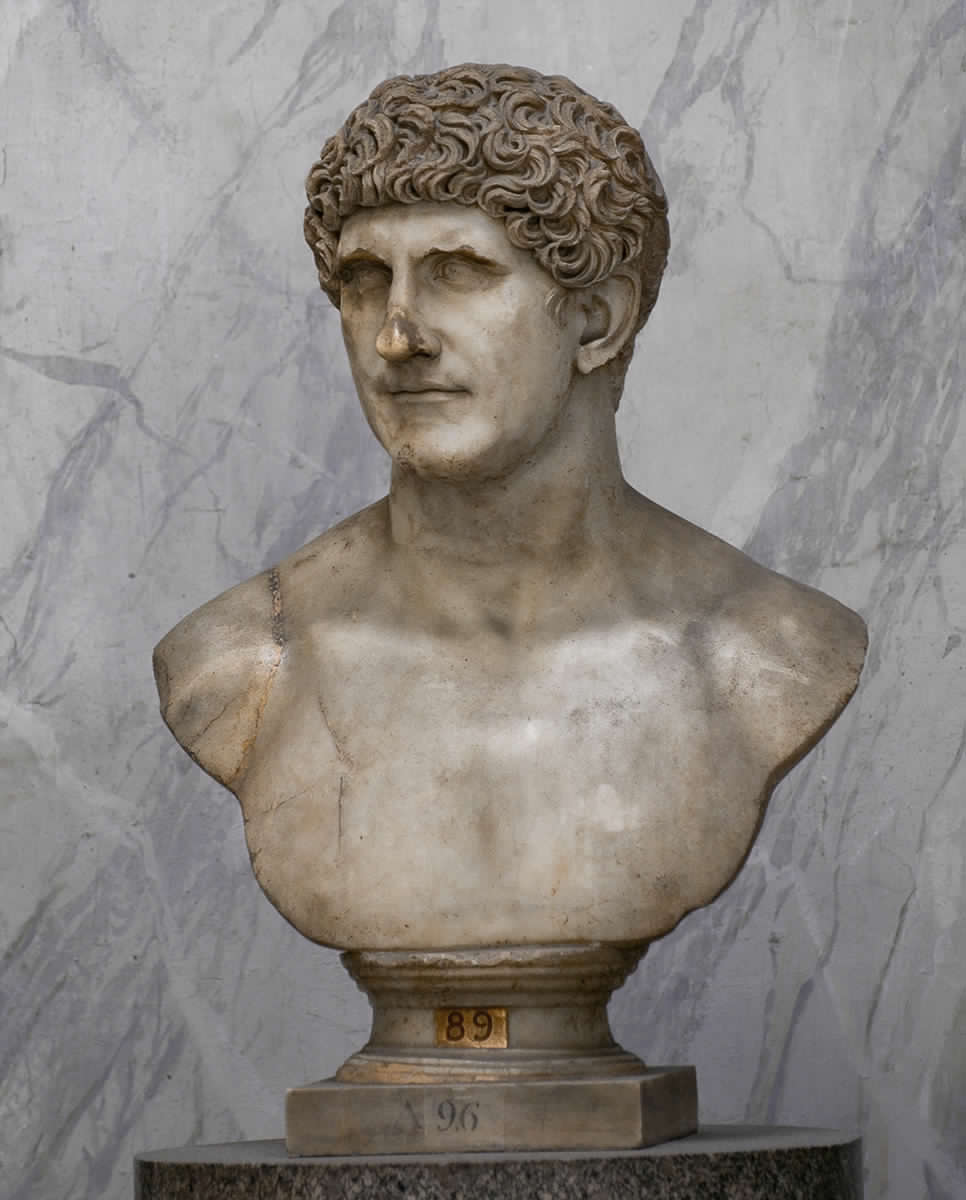
Mark Antony

The War of Actium or Actian War (32–30 BC) was the last civil war of the Roman Republic, fought between Mark Antony (assisted by Cleopatra and by extension Ptolemaic Egypt) and Octavian. In 32 BC, Octavian convinced the Roman Senate to declare war on the Egyptian queen Cleopatra. Her lover and ally Mark Antony, who was Octavian's rival, gave his support for her cause. Forty percent of the Roman Senate, together with both consuls, left Rome to join the war on Antony's side. After a decisive victory for Octavian at the Battle of Actium, Cleopatra and Antony withdrew to Alexandria, where Octavian besieged the city until both Antony and Cleopatra were forced to commit suicide.

The war involved some of the largest Roman armies ever seen. Both Antony and Octavian's legions were experienced veterans of previous civil wars who had fought together, many also having once served under Julius Caesar. The two did however raise their own legions separately.

Following the end of the war, Octavian brought peace to the Roman state that had been plagued by a century of civil wars, marking the beginning of the Pax Romana, a period of relative internal peace and stability. Octavian became the most powerful man in the Roman world and the Senate bestowed upon him the honorific of Augustus in 27 BC. Octavian, now Augustus, became the first Roman emperor and transformed the republic into the Roman Empire.

== Background ==
Mark Antony was in Egypt with Cleopatra instead of his wife, Octavia, Octavian's sister. Octavian was scheming to find a way to sever ties with Mark Antony, start a war to crush him, kill a potential rival and take control of the entire Roman world. He did this by cleverly exposing Antony's will to the senate, where he read out how Antony had left all his money to his children by Cleopatra, where they would reign as monarchs over kingdoms that he and Cleopatra would leave to them. Romans were scandalized by this type of behavior. Then Antony divorced Octavia to marry Cleopatra.

Octavian convinced the senate, via a propaganda campaign, to start a war against Cleopatra, because they were reluctant to declare war on Antony, as he was a true Roman and the senate did not want a mutiny. Eventually, Octavian forced Antony's senatorial supporters to flee from Rome, and in 32 BC, the Roman Senate declared war against Cleopatra.

== Political and military buildup ==
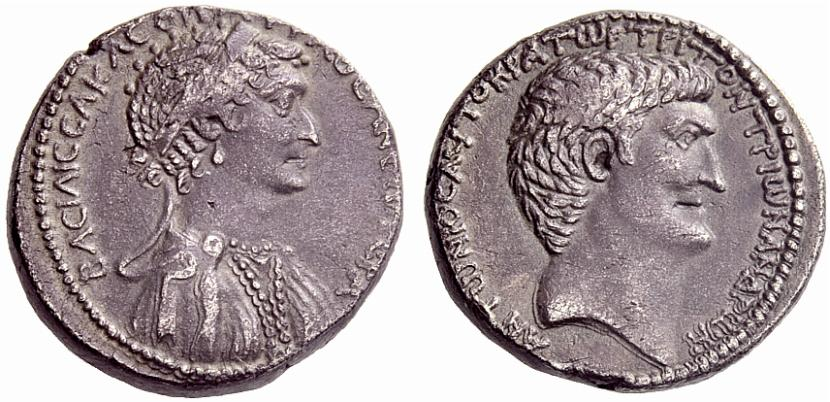
Cleopatra and Mark Antony on the obverse and reverse, respectively, of a silver tetradrachm struck at the Antioch mint in 36 BC

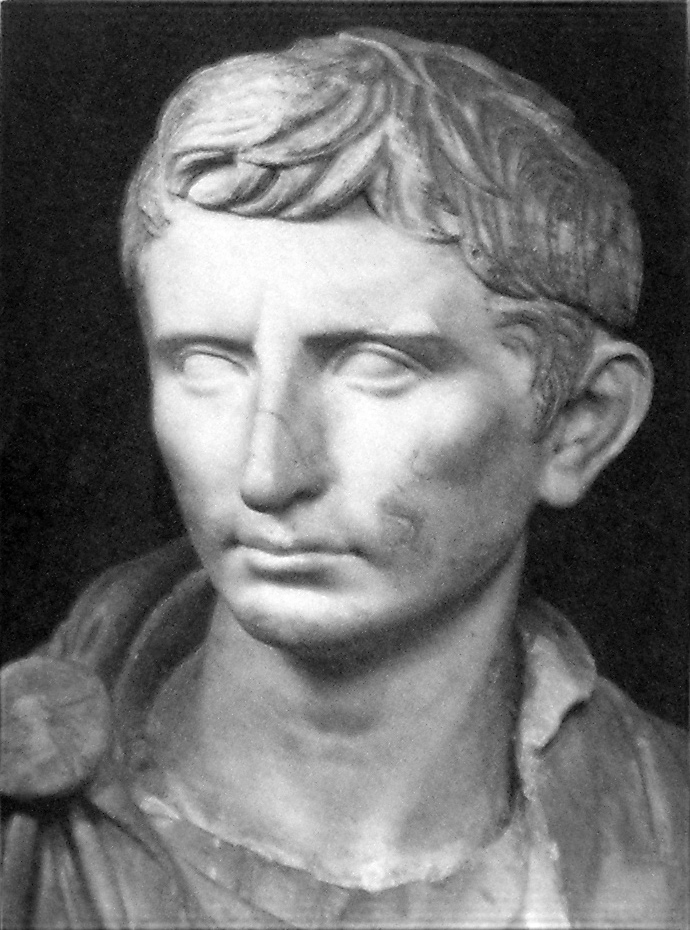
A reconstructed statue of Augustus as a younger Octavian, dated c. 30 BC

The Caesareans, Octavian (Caesar's principal, though not sole, heir), Antony, and Marcus Lepidus under the Second Triumvirate had stepped in to fill the power vacuum caused by Julius Caesar's assassination. After the triumvirate had defeated Marcus Junius Brutus and Gaius Cassius Longinus at the Battle of Philippi in 42 BC, and Lepidus was expelled from the triumvirate in 36 BC, Octavian and Antony were left as the two most powerful men in the Roman world. Octavian took control of the west, including Hispania, Gaul, Italia itself, and Africa. Antony received control of the east, including Graecia, Asia, Syria and Aegyptus.

For a time, Rome had peace. Octavian put down revolts in the west while Antony reorganized the east; however, the peace was short lived. Antony had been having an affair with the queen of Egypt, Cleopatra. Romans, especially Octavian, took note of Antony's actions. Since 40 BC, Antony had been married to Octavia Minor, the sister of Octavian. Octavian seized the opportunity and had his minister Gaius Maecenas produce a propaganda campaign against Antony.

Nearly all Romans felt astonished when they heard word of Antony's Donations of Alexandria. In these donations, Antony ceded much of Rome's territory in the east to Cleopatra. Cleopatra and Caesarion were crowned co-rulers of Egypt and Cyprus; Alexander Helios was crowned ruler of Armenia, Media, and Parthia; Cleopatra Selene II was crowned ruler of Cyrenaica and Libya; and Ptolemy Philadelphus was crowned ruler of Phoenicia, Syria, and Cilicia. Cleopatra took the title of "queen of kings" and Caesarion took the title of "king of kings".

In response, Octavian increased the personal attacks against Antony, but the senate and people of Rome were not convinced. Octavian's chance came when Antony married Cleopatra in 32 BC before he divorced Octavia. That action combined with information that Antony was planning to establish a second senate in Alexandria created the perfect environment for Octavian to strip Antony of his power.

Octavian summoned the senate and accused Antony of anti-Roman sentiments. Octavian had illegally seized Antony's will from the Temple of Vesta. In it, Antony recognized Caesarion as Caesar's legal heir, left his possessions to his children by Cleopatra, and finally indicated his desire to be buried with Cleopatra in Alexandria instead of in Rome. The senators were not moved by Caesarion or Antony's children but his desire to be buried outside Rome invoked the senate's rage. Octavian blamed Cleopatra, not Antony. The senate declared war on Cleopatra, and Octavian knew that Antony would come to her aid.

When Cleopatra received word that Rome had declared war, Antony threw his support to Egypt. Immediately, the senate stripped Antony of all his official power and labeled him an outlaw and a traitor. However, 40% of the senate, along with both consuls, sided with Antony and left Rome for Greece. Octavian gathered all of his legions, numbering almost 200,000 Roman legionaries. Cleopatra and Antony did so too, assembling roughly the same number in mixed heavy Roman and light Egyptian infantry.

== War ==
=== Naval theatre ===
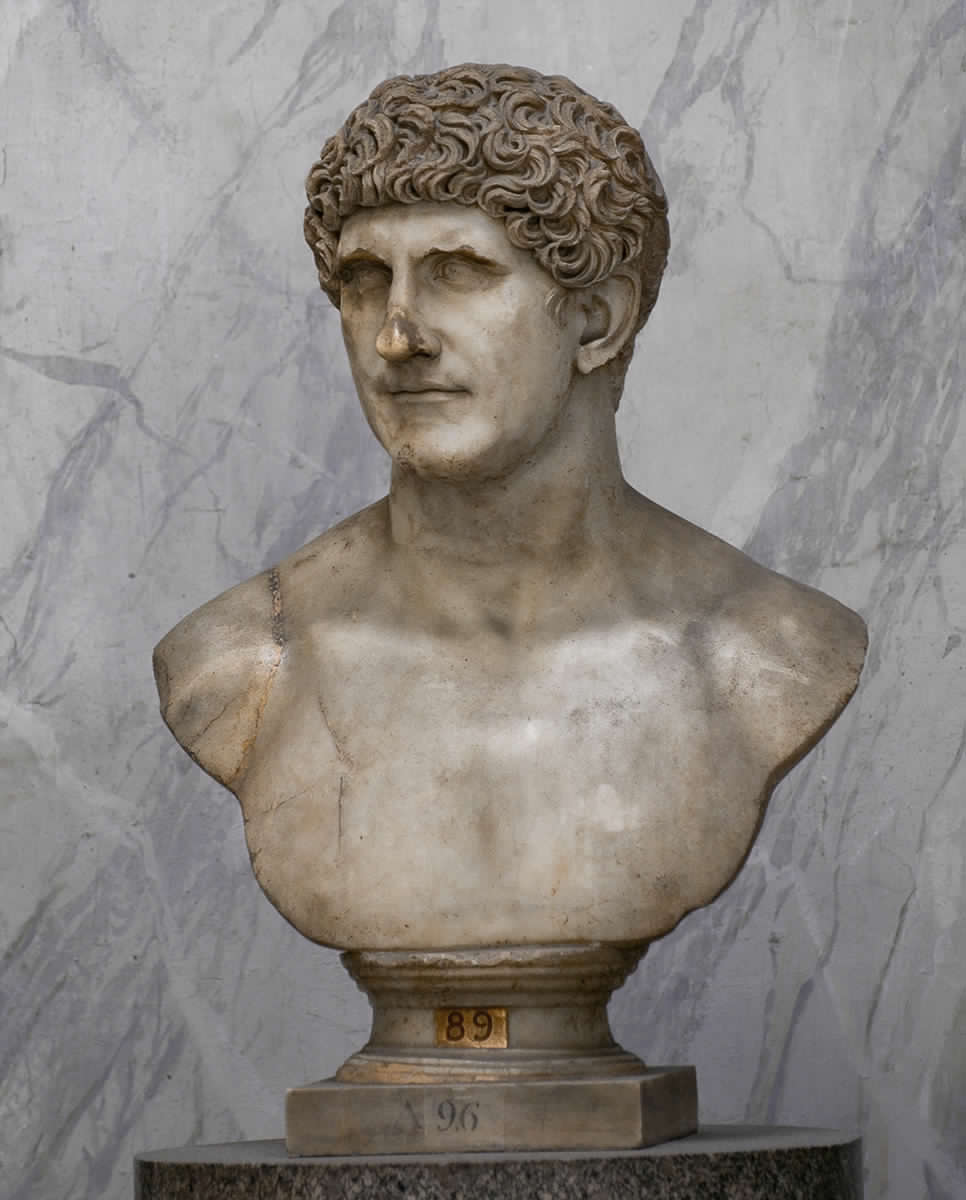
A Roman marble bust of the consul and triumvir Mark Antony, late 1st century AD, Vatican Museums

By mid-31 BC, Antony maneuvered his army into Greece and Octavian soon followed. Octavian brought with him his chief military adviser and closest friend Marcus Vipsanius Agrippa to command his naval forces. Although the ground forces were comparable, Octavian's fleet was superior in number. Antony's fleet was made up of large vessels, but with inexperienced crews and commanders. Octavian's fleet of smaller, more maneuverable vessels was filled with experienced sailors.

Octavian moved his soldiers across the Adriatic Sea to confront Antony near Actium. Meanwhile, Agrippa disrupted Antony's supply lines with the navy. Gaius Sosius commanded a squadron in Antony's fleet with which he managed to defeat the squadron of Lucius Arruntius and put it to flight, but when the latter was reinforced by Agrippa, Sosius's ally Tarcondimotus I - the king of Cilicia - was killed and Sosius himself was forced to flee.

Octavian decided not to attack and risk unnecessary losses. Instead, Octavian wanted to battle Antony by sea where his experienced sailors could dominate. In response, Antony and Octavian engaged in Fabian strategy until the time was right. As the summer ended and autumn began to set in, both Octavian and Antony settled for a battle of attrition. The strategy of delay paid dividends to Octavian, as morale sank and prominent Romans deserted Antony's cause. However, despite this, Antony was still able to maintain the loyalty of his legions.

The first conflict of the war occurred when Octavian's general Agrippa captured the Greek city and naval port of Methone. The city had previously been loyal to Antony. The fighting had been brutal but in the end Agrippa's hit and run tactics were successful. On the contrary, Antony's veteran cavalry won most of the skirmishes on land. Although Antony was an experienced soldier, he did not understand naval combat, which led to his downfall. Antony moved his fleet to Actium, where Octavian's navy and army had taken camp. The stage was set for one of the largest naval battles of all time, with Antony bringing 290 ships in addition to between 30 and 50 transports. Octavian had 350 ships. Antony's ships were much larger and better armed. In what would become known as the Battle of Actium, Antony, on September 2, 31 BC, moved his large quinqueremes through the strait and into the open sea. There, Octavian's light and manoeuvrable Liburnian ships drew in battle formation against Antony's warships. Cleopatra stayed behind Antony's line on her royal barge.

A devastating blow to Antony's forces came when one of Antony's former generals delivered Antony's battle plan to Octavian. Antony had hoped to use his biggest ships to drive back Agrippa's wing on the north end of his line, but Octavian's entire fleet stayed carefully out of range. Shortly after mid-day, Antony was forced to extend his line out from the protection of the shore, and then finally engage the enemy. Octavian's fleet, armed with better trained and fresher crews, made quick work of Antony's larger and less experienced navy. Octavian's soldiers had spent years fighting in Roman naval combat, where one objective was to ram the enemy ship and at the same time kill the above deck crew with a shower of arrows and catapult-launched stones large enough to decapitate a man.

As the armies stood on either side of the naval battle, they watched as Antony was being outmatched by Agrippa. Seeing that the battle was going against Antony, Cleopatra decided to follow Antony's original orders and took her squadron of ships and tried to penetrate Octavian's centre. As a gap opened in Agrippa's blockade, she funneled through, Antony then issued orders for his entire fleet to breakthrough Octavian's lines. Antony led the breakthrough and his spearhead was able to penetrate Octavian's centre. However, shortly after Antony's breakthrough, Agrippa ordered his flanks to attack the rest of Antony's ships from both sides. Antony and Cleopatra could only watch on helplessly as their fleet - once the largest in Roman history - was destroyed. By the end of the day, almost Antony's entire fleet lay at the bottom of the sea and the Roman world witnessed the largest naval battle in almost 200 years. The couple was forced to take their remaining 90 ships and retreat to Alexandria. Upon seeing the destruction of Antony's fleet, his legions decided that they would try to meet up with him, however, after losing control of the sea, supplies for Antony's legions ran thin. After a week the commanders of Antony's land forces, which were supposed to follow him to Asia, promptly surrendered their legions without a fight.

=== Land campaign ===
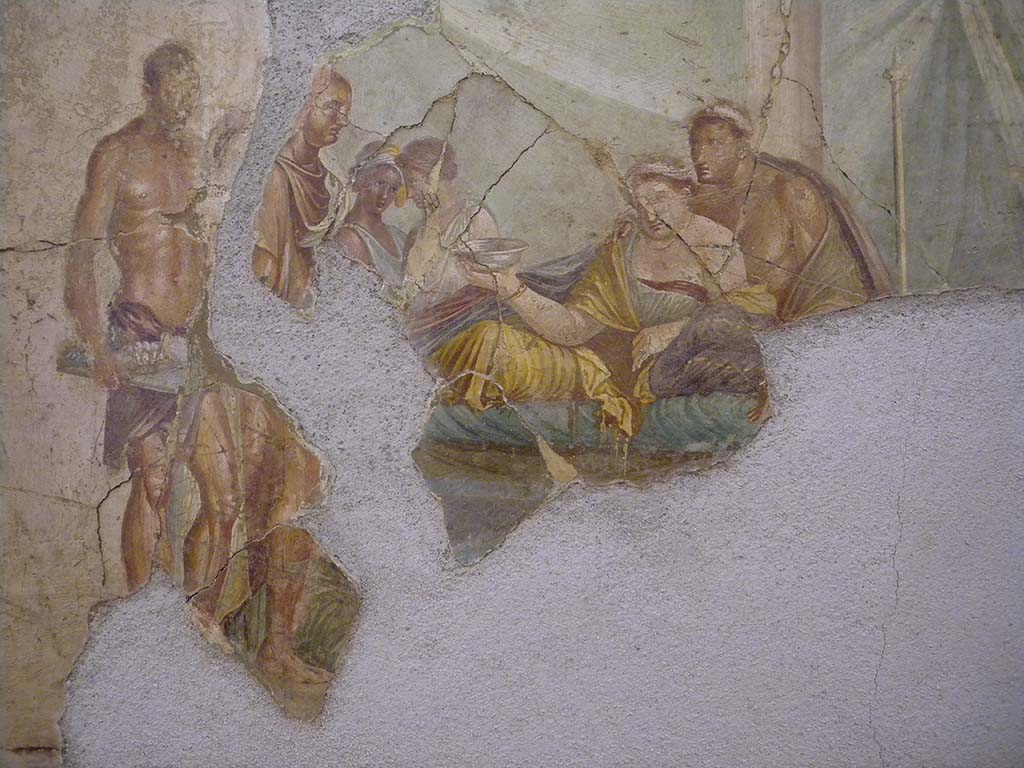
Roman painting from the House of Giuseppe II, Pompeii, early 1st century AD, most likely depicting Cleopatra VII of Ptolemaic Egypt, wearing her royal diadem, consuming poison in an act of suicide, while her son Caesarion, also wearing a royal diadem, stands behind her

Even though Octavian wanted to immediately pursue Antony and Cleopatra, many of his veterans wanted to retire and return to private life. Octavian allowed many of his longest serving veterans (as many as 10 legions by some accounts) to retire. Many of those legionaries could trace their service to Julius Caesar some 20 years earlier.

After the winter ended, Octavian resumed the hunt. In early 30 BC, Octavian rejected the idea of transporting his army across the sea and attacking Alexandria directly, and instead travelled by land through Asia. Antony had received much of his backing from Rome's client kingdoms in the east. By marching his army by land, Octavian ensured Antony could not regroup and cement his authority over the provinces.

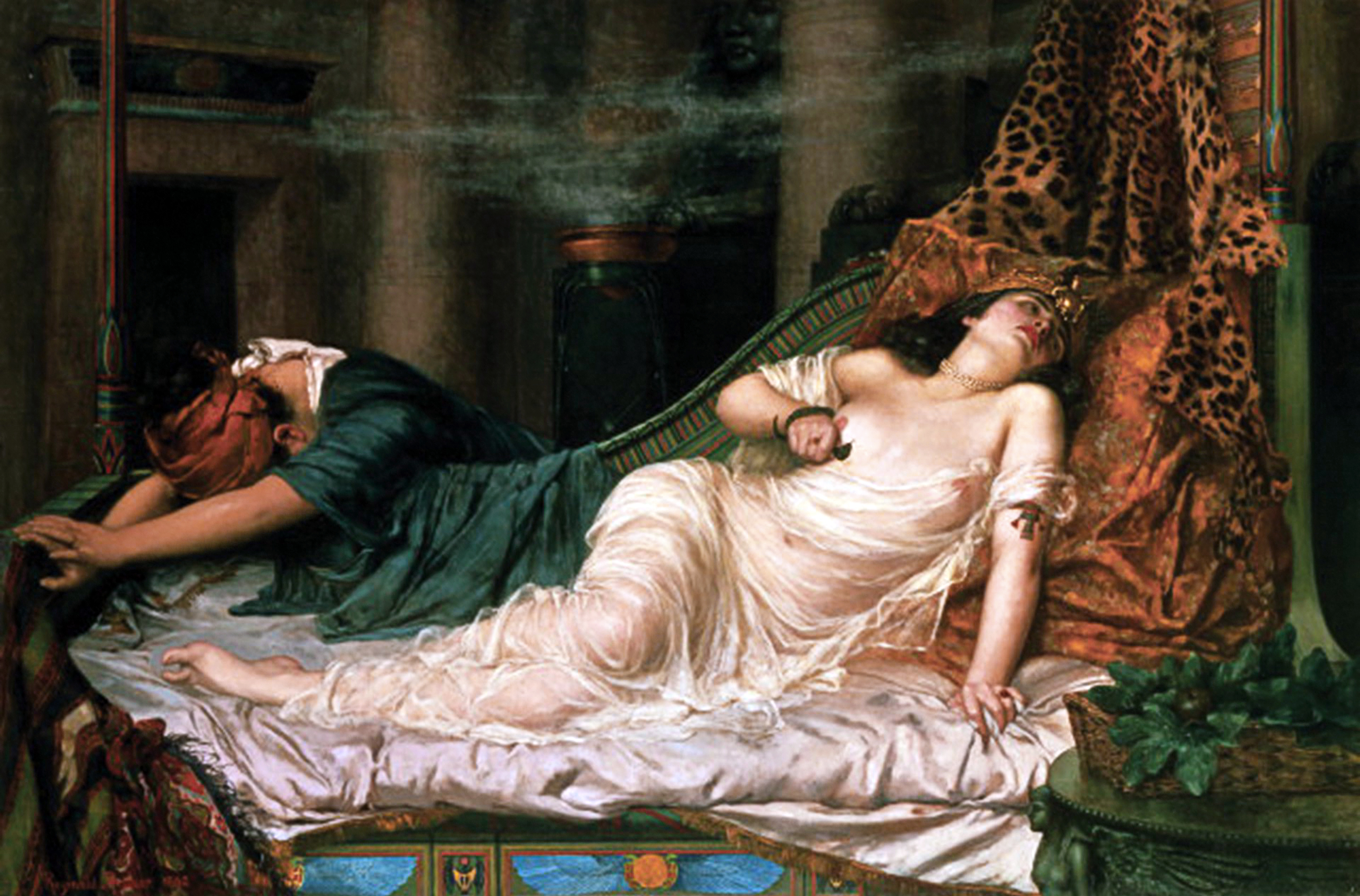
The Death of Cleopatra by Reginald Arthur (1892)

The majority of Antony's army, 23 legions plus 15,000 cavalry, had been left in Greece after Actium where, eventually, without supplies, they surrendered. Meanwhile, Antony attempted to secure an army in Cyrenaica from Lucius Pinarius. Unfortunately for Antony, Pinarius had switched his loyalty to Octavian. When Octavian received word of this development, he ordered Pinarius to move his four legions east towards Alexandria while Octavian would move west. Trapped in Egypt with the remnant of their former army, Antony and Cleopatra bided their time awaiting Octavian's arrival.

When Octavian and Pinarius arrived at Alexandria, they placed the entire city under siege. Before Octavian had arrived, Antony took the roughly 30,000 soldiers he had left and attacked Pinarius, unaware that he was outnumbered two to one. Pinarius destroyed what was left of Antony's army with Antony escaping back to Alexandria before Octavian arrived. As Octavian approached with his legions, what remained of Antony's cavalry and fleet surrendered to him. Most of the remainder of Antony's infantry surrendered without any engagement at this stage of the conflict, and Antony's cause was lost.

Antony was forced to watch as his army and hopes of dominance in Rome were handed to Octavian. In honourable Roman tradition, Antony, on August 1, 30 BC, fell on his sword. According to the ancient accounts however, he was not entirely successful and with an open wound in his belly, was taken to join Cleopatra, who had fled to her mausoleum. Here Antony succumbed to his wound and supposedly died in his lover's arms, leaving her alone to face Octavian.

Cleopatra did not immediately follow Antony in suicide. Instead, in a final effort to save her position and her children, Cleopatra opened negotiations with Octavian. Cleopatra begged Octavian to spare Caesarion's life in exchange for his willing imprisonment. Octavian refused, supposedly saying "two Caesars are one too many," as he ordered Caesarion's death. Subsequently, Caesarion was "butchered without compunction". Within that same week, Octavian also informed Cleopatra that she was to play a role in his triumph back in Rome, a role that was "carefully explained to her". According to Strabo, who was alive at the time of the event, Cleopatra died from a self-induced bite from a venomous snake, or from applying a poisonous ointment to herself. Learning of Cleopatra's death, Octavian had mixed feelings. He admired the bravery of Cleopatra, and gave her and Antony a public military funeral in Rome. The funeral was grand and a few of Antony's legions even marched alongside the tomb. A day of mourning throughout Rome was enacted. This was partly due to Octavian's respect for Antony and partly because it further helped show the Roman people how benevolent Octavian was. As they left Alexandria, a new age dawned when Rome annexed Egypt. With Cleopatra's death, the final war of the republic was over.

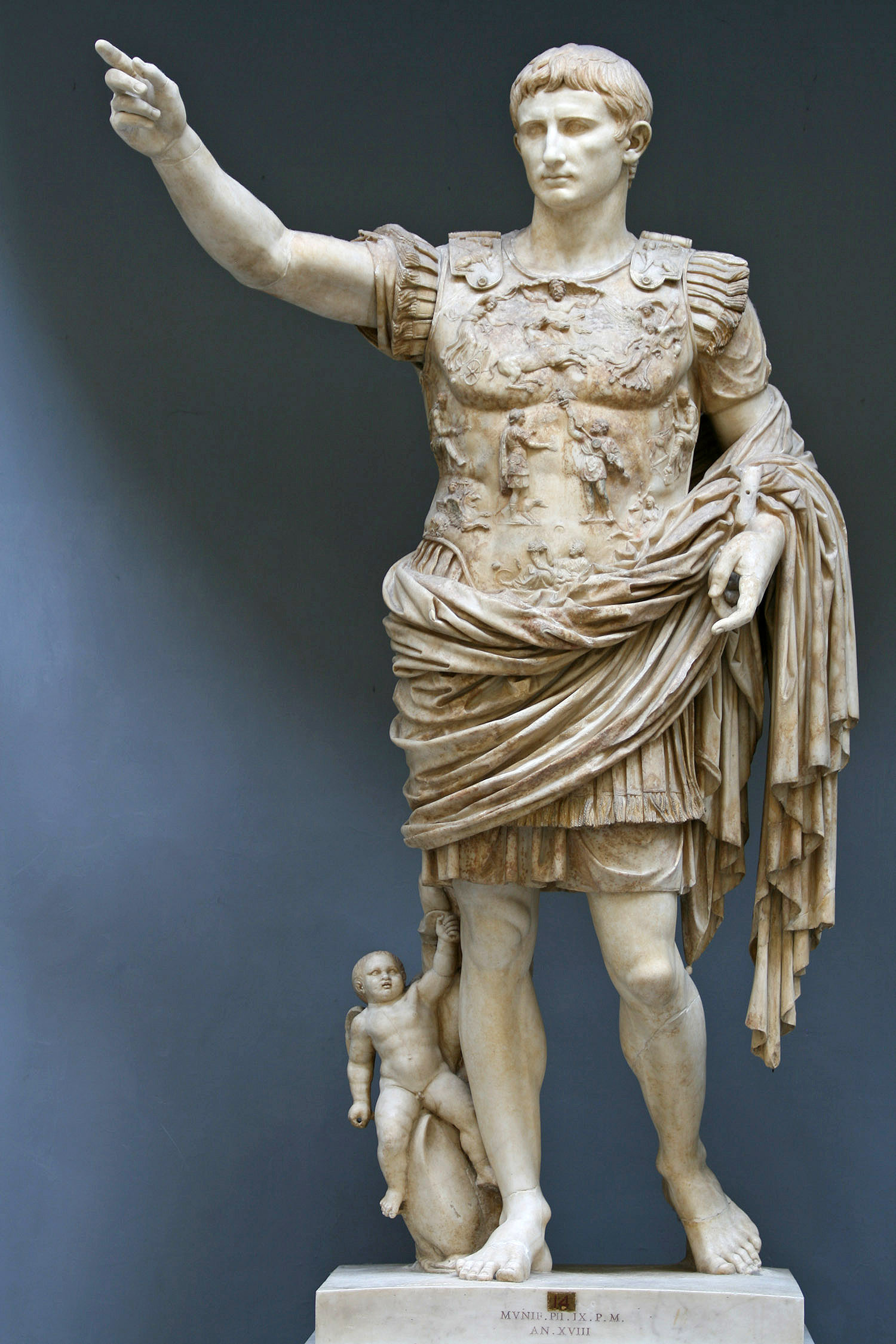
Due to this war, Octavian would become Augustus and the first Roman emperor.

== Aftermath ==
Within a month, Octavian was named pharaoh, and Egypt became his personal possession. By executing Antony's supporters, Octavian finally brought a century of civil war to a close. In 27 BC Octavian was named Augustus by the senate and given unprecedented powers. Octavian, now Augustus, transformed the republic into the Roman Empire, ruling it as the first Roman emperor.

In the ensuing months and years, Augustus passed a series of laws that, while outwardly preserving the appearance of the republic, made his position within it of paramount power and authority. He laid the foundations for what is now called the Roman Empire. From then on, the Roman state would be ruled by a princeps (first citizen); in modern terms, Rome would from now on be ruled by emperors.

The senate ostensibly still had power and authority over certain senatorial provinces, but the critical border provinces, such as Syria, Egypt, and Gaul, requiring the greatest numbers of legions, would be directly ruled by Augustus and succeeding emperors.

With the end of the last republican civil war, the republic was replaced by the empire. The reign of Augustus would usher in the golden era of Roman culture and produce a stability which Rome had not seen in over a century. With Rome in control of the entire Mediterranean world, a peace would reign in the Roman world for centuries after the death of Augustus: the so-called Pax Romana (Roman Peace).

Three of the Roman emperors in the 1st century, Caligula, Claudius, and Nero, were direct descendants of Antony.

The empire that Augustus established would last in Western Europe until the fall of Rome in the 5th century AD. The eastern part of the Roman Empire would also survive as the Byzantine Empire until the fall of Constantinople in AD 1453.

== See also ==
- Legionary denarii (Mark Antony)
- List of Roman civil wars and revolts
- Pax Romana by Adrian Goldsworthy
