= Pax Romana (book) =

2016 nonfiction book by Adrian Goldsworthy

Pax Romana: War, Peace and Conquest in the Roman World
- 2016 book jacket
- Author: Adrian Goldsworthy
- Audio read by: Derek Perkins
- Subject: Ancient Roman Empire
- Set in: 1st and 2nd centuries AD
- Published: 2016
- Publisher: Yale University Press
- Publication place: United States
- Media type: Print, eBook, Audio
- Pages: 500+
- ISBN: 9780300178821
- OCLC: 941874968
- Website: Official website

Pax Romana: War, Peace and Conquest in the Roman World is a nonfiction book that is both a historical analysis and interrogation of the ancient Roman Pax Romana of the first and second centuries AD. It was written by Adrian Goldsworthy and published by Yale University Press in 2016.

== Synopsis ==
In Pax Romana, the author, Goldsworthy, shows how Rome built and maintained its governance through two distinct periods. The first half of the book is about the Roman Republic. Here, Goldsworthy depicts government institutions, Rome's reasons for war and its military tactics, and how it applied diplomacy as tool for managing its diverse territories.

Rivalries and friendships in its politics are also described. He also looks at how mercantile Romans spread throughout the empire (Roman trade). Additionally, he shows how the Romans governed the provinces, followed by Roman interactions with Hellenistic rulers, including the relationship of Antony and Cleopatra.

The second half of the book discusses the Principate, beginning with the peace established by Augustus. This section covers provincial revolts and banditry, more about the governing of provinces with the addition of dealing with corruption. Goldsworthy also presents the views held by its subjects. The conclusion denotes the world beyond Roman territory and then looks at the Empire's decline during the Third Century Crisis

Vignettes about well known historical persons are part of the narrative and analyses such as on Cicero, Boudica, and Julius Caesar.

=== Describing Pax Romana ===
According to Patrick Hunt, writing for the academic journal Roman Archaeology, Goldsworthy depicts the Pax Romana as a complex concept which came into being due to a combination of war, conquest, and ultimately the assertion of Roman law and Roman administration over its territories. The book shows that the peace of Pax Romana was forged by violent and bloody conquest, such as during the period of the Roman Republic.

One of Goldsworthy's main points is that the narrative goes beyond oversimplified views of Pax Romana, because the period itself comprised both stability and brutality. Hunt says that one image of the Imperium during this period, as presented to the modern world, is as a time of prosperity, security, and the strength of an organized society. However, Hunt notes that Goldsworthy "confidently reminds his readers that millions died in Roman wars, millions more became slaves, and even more would live under Roman rule, voluntarily or not." Hence, Hunt quotes Goldsworthy as saying in his preface:

[T] his is a book about peace, and sometimes about defense, but it must also be a book about conquest, aggression, warfare, violence and exploitation... so we should begin with the Romans as conquerors rather than as imperial overlords (p.18 in Preface).

Michael J. Taylor, writing for the Bryn Mawr Classical Review says that Goldsworthy contends that the Roman Empire's peace and prosperity were not an intended outcome, but rather it is what happened after Rome went after security and dominance with a relentless and aggressive manner.

There are several well known rebellions that perturbed the peace. Arminius in Teutoburg Forest (Teutoburger Wald) near Kalkriese battled the Romans and managed to secure territory, making it independent of Rome. And there were other rebellions that failed: "Tacfarinas in North Africa, Boudicca in Britain, and the three great Jewish rebellions." These were fractious or schisms. These were attempts to break free from Roman control

== About the book ==
The book chronologically divides into two main parts, the Republic and the Principate. Each part has chapters that cover different topics and people in the Roman world like the governing of provinces, or the benefits of living in the Empire.

Part 1, on the Republic has the following chapters:

I. The Rise of Rome
II. War (with subheadings such as “Massacre” and “Ruthlessness”)
III. Friends and Rivals
IV. Traders and Settlers
V. Government
VI. Provincials and Kings

Part 2, on the Principate:

VII. Emperors
VIII. Rebellion
IX. Resistance, Rioting and Robbery
X. Imperial Governors
XI. Life Under Roman Rule
XII. The Army and the frontiers
XIII. Garrisons and raids
XIV. Beyond the Pax Romana.
Conclusion: Peace and War

There is also an Index, a bibliography, a glossary with 70 entries, and a "useful chronology (from the founding of Rome down to a terminus of A.D. 476)."

== Reception ==
Micheal J. Taylor a reviewer for Bryn Mawr Classical Review says that this book "succeeds admirably at its goal of communicating the complexities of Roman imperial history with great clarity and insight. Pax Romana is a well-crafted piece of historical writing that will certainly enlighten a wide audience."

Anthony Smart writing for the academic journal The Classical World says that although the main argument is not fleshed out, the first part of the book on the Roman Republic, "provides a good balance between narrative flair and clear historical analysis." Also, the second part of the book, Rome as an empire, "covers an impressive variety of topics... the depth of analysis is somewhat inconsistent."

Greg DeGroot, reviewing this book for The Times (UK), says that "Goldsworthy brings a wonderful vitality to his subject; his account possesses an immediacy usually associated with contemporary history. The reader is treated to an enthralling view of a highly complex system of governance. Too often, Rome’s brutality has overshadowed the brilliance of her administrators. Goldsworthy gives statecraft its proper emphasis."

According to Christopher Kelly, writing for The Times Literary Supplement, Goldsworthy's book, "explores [the] uncomfortable paradox of empire with honest and intelligent indecision. It is a satisfying and thought-provoking book for anyone determined to dislike the Romans while admiring their imperial achievement.

Patrick Hunt of the academic journal Roman Archaeology says, "This new book will be far more than a textbook of great clarity and utility for university students taking courses on the history of Rome; like all of Goldsworthy’s works, it will also be immensely useful as a resource for scholars."

Kirkus Reviews says, that Goldsworthy's book is "[a]n engrossing account of how the Roman Empire grew and operated."

== See also ==
- Service in the Roman Army by Roy W Davies
- How Rome Fell by Adrian Goldsworthy

== Other reviews ==
- Gale A496344669 Jones, Tony. "Pax Romana: War, Peace and Conquest in the Roman World." The Christian Century, May 24, 2017, 41. Gale Academic OneFile—accessed August 3, 2025
- Gale A485936682 Gabriel, R. A. (2017, May). Pax Romana: War, Peace and Conquest in the Roman World. Military History, 34(1), 71.
- Freedman, Lawrence D. (2016). "Reviewed work: Pax Romana: War, Peace, and Conquest in the Roman World, ADRIAN GOLDSWORTHY". Foreign Affairs. 95 (6): 178. JSTOR 43948409.
- Warren, Jason W. (2021). "Pax Romana: War, Peace, and Conquest in the Roman World." Parameters 50.(4): 165-6. Web. 2 Aug. 2025.(scroll down) or use ProQuest 2476869251
- Faulkner, Richard S. (Lt. Col.) (May 12, 2017). "Review: Pax Romana". Military Review. Army University Press.
