= Galeria Copiola =

Galeria Copiola (96 BC – AD 9 or after) was an ancient Roman dancer (emboliaria) and actress whom Pliny includes in a list of notable female nonagenarians and centenarians in his Natural History. Because of Pliny's notice, Galeria is one of the few performing artists in classical antiquity whose career milestones can be precisely dated.

== Performance genre ==
The embolimon (Greek, literally an "insert") was a musical number performed between the acts of a play. In Roman theatre, the embolium (Latin, plural embolia) in which Galeria specialized was an interlude, probably solo, performed by a dancing girl or mima. The embolium is treated in modern scholarship as a form of ballet-pantomime requiring turns, leaping, versatility of movement, sudden "freezing," and a particular repertoire of hand gestures.

The embolium interlude was part of the mixed musical-comedy genre called mimus. Roman mimus was regularly performed without masks, in contrast to virtually every other form of ancient theatre for which female roles were performed by men. Mimus gave women opportunities to earn a living as professional entertainers, and Galeria's career is evidence of the long-lived acclaim and financial reward they might achieve. Galeria Copiola is one of only four performers of embolia whose names are preserved, the others being Sophê Theorobathylliana, Phoebe Vocontia, and an Oppius who is the only recorded male embolarius.

== Career ==
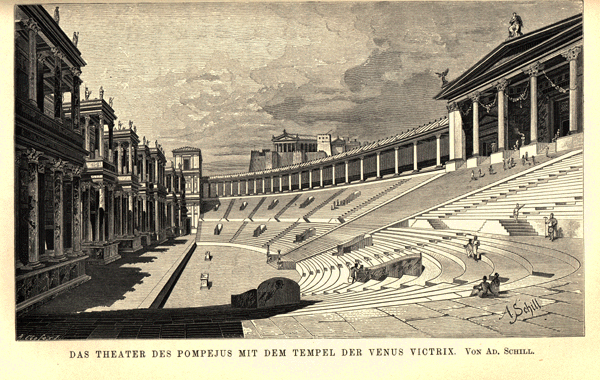
The Theatre of Pompey and the Temple of Venus Victrix, as reimagined in 1908

Galeria made her stage debut in 82 BC at the age of 13 or 14, during Sulla's rule, in a theatrical event produced by the plebeian aedile Marcus Pomponius. The occasion was either the Feast of Ceres in April or the Plebeian Games in November. A Roman girl came of age at around 12 to 14, and entertainers seem to have begun their career at this time.

Galeria's renown was such that when the dedication ceremonies were held for the monumental Theatre of Pompey in 55 BC, she was brought out of retirement as a "living legend." A number of former luminaries of the stage appeared, among them the aging actor Aesopus, whose performance fell short of the reputation he had earned in his prime. Cicero, who attended, remarked, without naming Galeria specifically, that it might have been better for the older entertainers to have rested on their laurels. Galeria was about 40 at the time. Since she was still physically able to perform, and enjoyed good enough health to live to a remarkable old age, her retirement must have been by choice, enabled by significant earnings.

Galeria's last public appearance was at the votive games (ludi) celebrated in honor of Augustus in AD 9, when she was 104. Pliny says nothing about the performance itself, or whether she appeared only as a guest of honor.

== See also ==
- Women in ancient Rome
