= Quintus Caecilius (adoptive father of Atticus) =

Adoptive father of Atticus

Quintus Caecilius (born c. 130 BC) was a Roman military leader known for his palace in Tampillium on the Quirinal Hill, which featured a beautiful hanging garden in oriental style, with towers and terraces surrounded by a grove of trees. Other properties he was noted for owning include a house and a tomb at the Fifth Mile of the Appian Way, where he was buried. He was able to afford these luxuries from the favours he received during his campaign in Asia, granted to him by his relative, perhaps his first cousin, Lucius Licinius Lucullus.

Not having issue, he adopted his maternal nephew, the son of his sister Caecilia and her husband Titus Pomponius, Titus Pomponius Atticus; who for that reason became called Quintus Caecilius Pomponianus Atticus.
