= Titus Pomponius =

2nd century BC Roman nobleman

Titus Pomponius was a member of the Gens Pomponia who claimed direct male descent of the line of Pomponius, the first son of Numa Pompilius, the second King of Rome, and came from an old but not strictly noble Roman family of the equestrian class. He was the owner of an excellent library in his house at the Appian Way, lord of a great fortune, partner of many companies of publicans and of important companies of fishing and conserves (essentially garum) in Gades, in Hispania, and of great properties in Illyricum.

Married to Caecilia Metella (ca 130 BC – ca 50 BC), the sister of Quintus Caecilius Metellus, he was the father of Titus Pomponius Atticus and Pomponia, married about 70 BC to Quintus Tullius Cicero (102 BC – 43 BC), brother of the celebrated orator Marcus Tullius Cicero.
