= Battle of Alexandria (30 BC) =

Part of the Last War of the Roman Republic

- Part of the War of Actium
Date	July 1 – July 30, 30 BC
Location	Alexandria, Egypt
Result	Octavian victory

Belligerents
Octavian's forces	Antony's forces Ptolemaic Egypt

Commanders and leaders
Octavian; Marcus Agrippa	Mark Antony; Cleopatra

Strength
44,000 Roman legionaries	28,000 Roman legionaries 6,000 Egyptian troops

Casualties and losses
11,000	12,000

The Battle of Alexandria was fought on July 1 to July 30, 30 BC between the forces of Octavian and Mark Antony during the last war of the Roman Republic. In the Battle of Actium, Antony had lost the majority of his fleet and had been forced to abandon the majority of his army in Greece, where without supplies they eventually surrendered. Although Antony's side was hindered by a few desertions, he still managed to narrowly defeat Octavian's forces in his initial defence. The desertions continued, however, and, in early August, Octavian launched a second, ultimately successful, invasion of Egypt, after which Antony and his lover, Cleopatra, committed suicide.

== Background ==
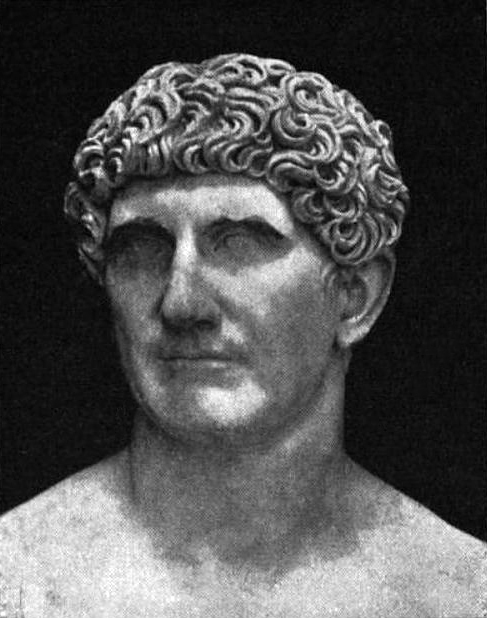
A Roman bust of the consul and triumvir Mark Antony, Vatican Museums

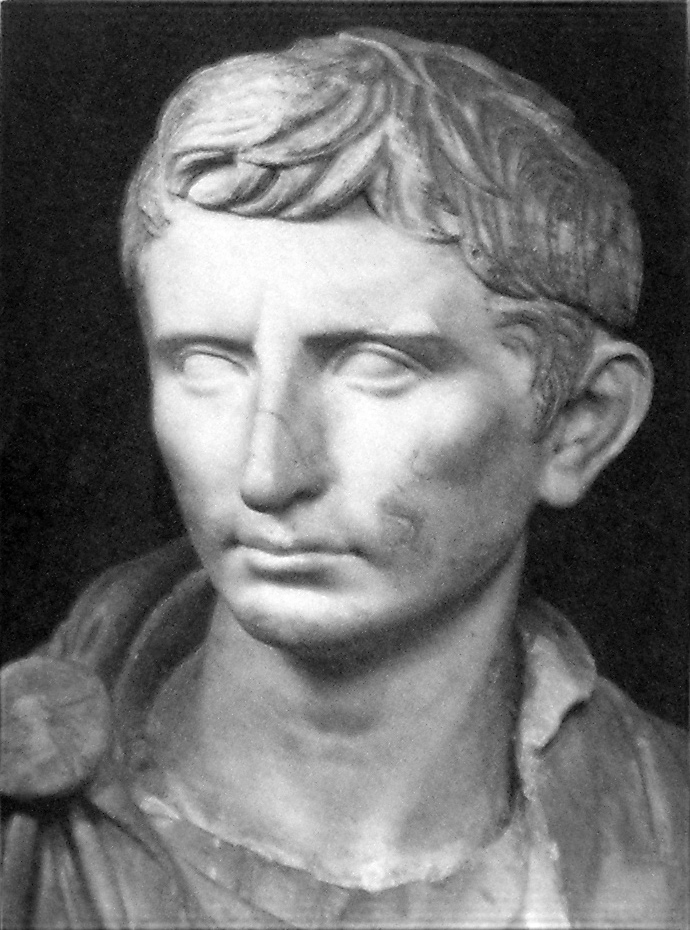
A reconstructed statue of Augustus as a younger Octavian, dated c. 30 BC

The alliance among Octavian, Mark Antony and Marcus Lepidus, commonly known as the Second Triumvirate, was renewed for a five-year term in 38 BC. But the triumvirate broke down when Octavian saw Caesarion, the professed son of Julius Caesar and Queen Cleopatra VII of Egypt, as a major threat to his power. This occurred when Mark Antony, the other most influential member of the triumvirate, abandoned his wife, Octavian's sister Octavia Minor. Afterward he moved to Egypt to start a long-term romance with Cleopatra, becoming Caesarion's de facto stepfather. Octavian and the majority of the Roman Senate saw Antony as leading a separatist movement that threatened to break the Roman Republic's unity.

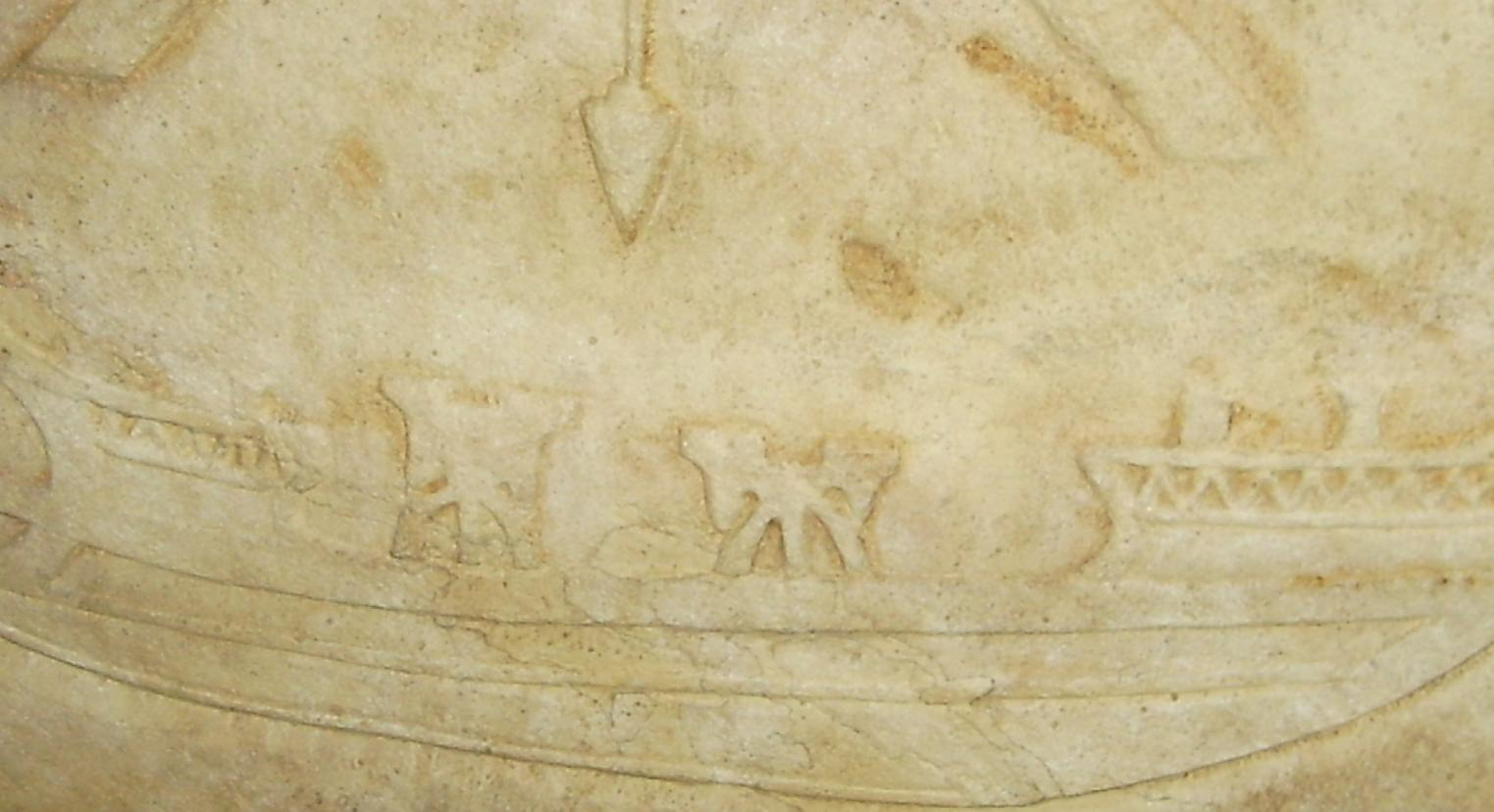
Ballistae on a Roman ship

Octavian's prestige and, more importantly, his legions' loyalty had been boosted by Julius Caesar's legacy of 44 BC, by which he was officially adopted as Caesar's only son and the sole legitimate heir of his enormous wealth. Antony had been the most important and most successful senior officer in Caesar's army (magister equitum) and, thanks to his military record, claimed a substantial share of the political support of Caesar's soldiers and veterans. Both Octavian and Antony had fought against their common enemies in the Liberators' civil war that followed the assassination of Caesar.

After years of loyal cooperation with Octavian, Antony started to act independently, eventually arousing his rival's suspicion that he was vying to become sole master of Rome. When he left Octavia Minor and moved to Alexandria to become Cleopatra's official partner, many Roman politicians suspected that he was trying to become the unchecked ruler of Egypt and other eastern kingdoms while still maintaining his command over the many Roman legions in the East. As a personal challenge to Octavian's prestige, Antony tried to get Caesarion accepted as a true heir of Caesar, even though the legacy did not mention him. Antony and Cleopatra formally elevated Caesarion, then 13, to power in 34 BC, giving him the title "King of the Kings" (Donations of Alexandria). Such an entitlement was seen as a threat to Roman republican traditions. It was widely believed that Antony had once offered Caesarion a diadem. Thereafter, Octavian started a propaganda war, denouncing Antony as an enemy of Rome and asserting that he intended to establish a monarchy over the Roman Empire on Caesarion's behalf, circumventing the Roman Senate. It was also said that Antony intended to move the imperial capital to Alexandria.

As the Second Triumvirate formally expired on the last day of 33 BC, Antony wrote to the Senate that he did not wish to be reappointed. He hoped that it might regard him as its champion against the ambition of Octavian, whom he presumed would not be willing to abandon his position in a similar manner. The causes of mutual dissatisfaction between the two had been accumulating. Antony complained that Octavian had exceeded his powers in deposing Lepidus, in taking over the countries held by Sextus Pompeius and in enlisting soldiers for himself without sending half to him. Octavian complained that Antony had no authority to be in Egypt; that his execution of Sextus Pompeius was illegal; that his treachery to the king of Armenia disgraced the Roman name; that he had not sent half the proceeds of the spoils to Rome according to his agreement; and that his connection with Cleopatra and acknowledgment of Caesarion as a legitimate son of Caesar were a degradation of his office and a menace to himself.

In 32 BC, one-third of the Senate and both consuls, Gnaeus Domitius Ahenobarbus and Gaius Sosius, allied with Antony. The consuls had determined to conceal the extent of Antony's demands. Ahenobarbus seems to have wished to keep quiet, but on 1 January Sosius made an elaborate speech in favor of Antony, and would have proposed the confirmation of his act had it not been vetoed by a tribune. Octavian was not present, but at the next meeting made a reply that provoked both consuls to leave Rome to join Antony; Antony, when he heard of it, after publicly divorcing Octavia, went at once to Ephesus with Cleopatra, where a vast fleet was gathered from all parts of the East, of which Cleopatra furnished a large proportion. After staying with his allies at Samos, Antony moved to Athens. His land forces, which had been in Armenia, came down to the coast of Asia and embarked under Publius Canidius Crassus.

Octavian kept up his strategic preparations. Military operations began in 32 BC, when his general Agrippa captured Methone, a Greek town allied to Antony. But by the publication of Antony's will, which Lucius Munatius Plancus had put into Octavian's hands, and by carefully letting it be known in Rome what preparations were going on at Samos and how Antony was effectively acting as the agent of Cleopatra, Octavian produced such a violent outburst of feeling that he easily obtained Antony's deposition from the consulship of 31 BC, for which Antony had been designated. In addition to the deposition, Octavian procured a proclamation of war against Cleopatra. This was well understood to mean against Antony, though he was not named. In issuing a war declaration, the Senate deprived Antony of any legal authority.

== Battle ==
Following his decisive victory at Actium, for the majority of July, Octavian lay siege to Alexandria. However, Antony's troops were well trained and battle hardened; some had fought alongside Antony for 20 years. Despite Octavian having a numerical advantage, Antony used the walls of Alexandria with great effectiveness. Throughout July, Octavian launched probing assaults on the city, but, unable to find a clear weakness, did not make a decisive assault. After a month of hard fighting, many of his troops wanted to launch an all-out assault. On July 30, Octavian launched his attack. The fighting was brutal, but Antony was able to resist Octavian at the city's hippodrome. However, heavy casualties (close to 10,000) on both sides further diminished any chance Antony had.

In early August, Octavian, now severely outnumbering Antony, launched a second, ultimately successful attack by land from east and west, causing the city to fall. Antony committed suicide, as did Cleopatra nine days after the battle. Octavian had Caesarion, Cleopatra's son by Julius Caesar, as well as Mark Antony's eldest son, Antyllus, executed. Octavian showed mercy to the rest of Antony's children and gave them to his sister and Antony's former wife, Octavia, to be raised as Roman citizens, although Anthony's youngest sons did not survive to adulthood but died in unclear circumstances. Antony's other children would all rise to positions of relative power, and eventually would be direct ancestors to three Roman emperors: Claudius, Nero and Caligula. In 28 BC Cicero, the son of the legendary orator and also a key Octavian supporter, removed all of Antony's busts from Rome. They were eventually restored via his Imperial descendants.

== Aftermath ==
Octavian recognized the value of holding Egypt and had the kingdom annexed as a Roman province. Following the annexation of the kingdom, all Roman officials sent to Egypt were from the equestrian class, and no senator could visit Roman Egypt without direct permission from Octavian.

At the age of thirty-three, Octavian had finally achieved the undisputed control of the Roman world which had been his unwavering ambition through fourteen years of civil war. To this end, he had been responsible for death, destruction, confiscation, and unbroken misery on a scale quite unmatched in all the previous phases of Roman civil conflict over the past century, but he managed to maintain peace and ushered in a golden era for Rome until his death at age 75, though at the cost of Alexandrian independence and Roman blood.

== Sources ==
- David, Rosalie; David, Anthony E. (2002). A Biographical Dictionary of Ancient Egypt. Routledge. ISBN 978-1135377045.
- Kebric, Robert B. (2005). Roman People. McGraw-Hill. ISBN 978-0072869040.
- Potter, D.S. (2009). Rome in the Ancient World: From Romulus to Justinian. Thames & Hudson. ISBN 978-0500251522.
- Scullard, H. H. (2013). From the Gracchi to Nero: A History of Rome 133 BC to AD 68. Routledge. ISBN 978-1136783876.
- Shuckburgh, Evelyn Shirley (1917). A History of Rome to the Battle of Actium. New York: Macmillan and Company.
