= Marcus Pomponius (tribune of the plebs 362 BCE) =

4th-century BCE Roman dictator

Marcus Pomponius was a statesman of ancient Rome, of the Pomponia gens, who lived in the 4th century BCE. He served as tribune of the plebs in 362 BCE, and brought an accusation against Lucius Manlius Capitolinus Imperiosus, who had been dictator in the preceding year, but was compelled to drop the accusation by Manlius's son, Titus Manlius Imperiosus, afterwards surnamed Torquatus, who obtained entry into the tribune's house, and threatened him with immediate death if he did not swear that he would abandon the impeachment of his father.
