= Westbourne School, Penarth =

Coordinates: 51.438°N 3.175°W

Westbourne School
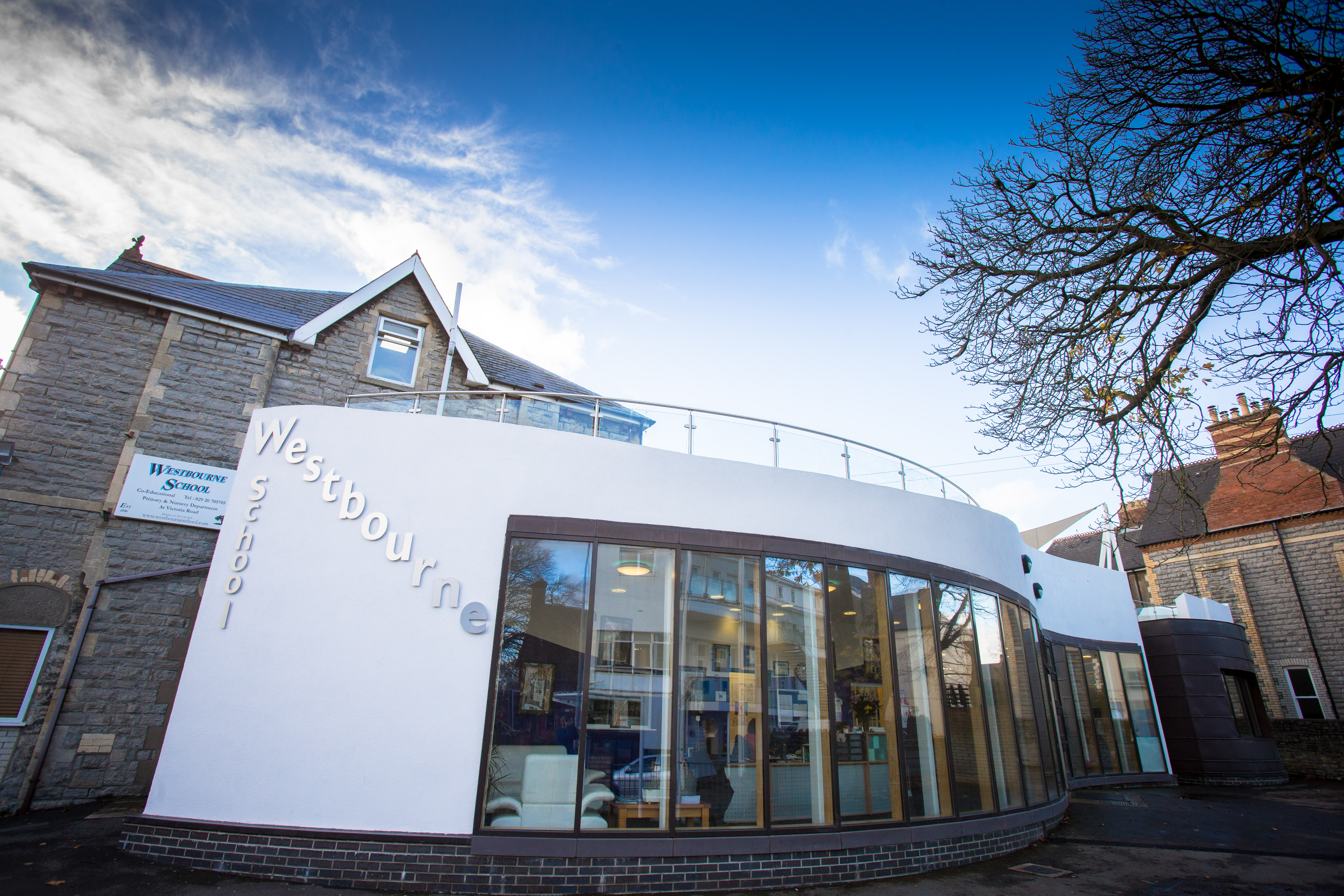

Location
- 4 Hickman Road; Penarth, Vale of Glamorgan, CF64 2AJ; Wales

Information
- Type: Private boarding and day school Prep school and Pre-prep school International Baccalaureate & A-Level Sixth Form
- Established: 1896; 130 years ago
- Founder: Caroline Ferris
- Local authority: Vale of Glamorgan
- Principal: Rachel Rees (since Sept 2025)
- Staff: 50
- Gender: Co-educational
- Age: 3 to 18
- Enrolment: 250
- Houses: 2 (Darwin and Turing)
- Colours: Navy Blue and Red
- Alumni: Old Westbournians
- Website: www.westbourneschool.com

Westbourne School is a coeducational private day and boarding school for pupils between the ages of 3 and 18 located in the commuter town of Penarth, in the Vale of Glamorgan, Wales 5.2 miles (8.4 kilometres) south west from the Welsh capital city of Cardiff.

Traditionally the school was strictly boys only. However, in the mid-1980s, the decision was taken to also accept girls and become a coeducational school. Westbourne School opened its 6th form for the Autumn term of 2008. The school introduced the speciality of the Diploma Programme of the International Baccalaureate Organisation in 2008.

The school is housed on two main campuses, approximately half a mile apart. The first houses the Pre-School and Prep, the other the Senior School and Sixth Form. Additionally, the school's 'Innovation Hub' is located opposite the Senior School, and only a couple of minutes' walk from the Westbourne Boarding House.

The school is now owned by the Montague Place Group of Independent Schools.

== History ==
=== Foundation ===
The school first opened in 1895 at Ebenezer House on Westbourne Road, Penarth. However, the school's foundation is deemed to be during the following year in 1896 under the headship of Mrs Caroline Ferris. Mrs Ferris renamed Ebenezer House as Westbourne House and the school was therefore retitled as Westbourne House Preparatory School for Boys.

In 1901 the school relocated to the large corner property at 13 Stanwell Road, which still forms part of the current school building.

=== Expansion ===
In 1975 the adjoining property at 4 Hickman Road was also purchased and the combined properties were developed as Westbourne Senior School. The school opened a junior college for children aged between 9 and 11 years of age.

It was decided to make the additional purchase of the struggling independent St Alma’s Girls School located in Victoria Road and, with the purchase, the combined school became coeducational, teaching girls as well as boys.

=== Notable Events ===
In December 2025 Westbourne was named 'Independent Secondary School of the Year in Wales' by the Sunday Times Parent Power Guide.

Westbourne is ranked #1 boarding school in the UK for results (ib-schools, co-ed, 2025).

In February 2024, news was released that one of Westbourne's full scholarship students, Illia Mitiushnikov, who was a Ukrainian refugee, had been accepted into the University of Oxford to study politics, philosophy and economics (PPE).

At the 2024 Pearson National Teaching Awards headteacher Joanne Chinnock was named Headteacher of the Year and digital director, Stuart Ayres, was named Innovator of the Year.

== The school today ==
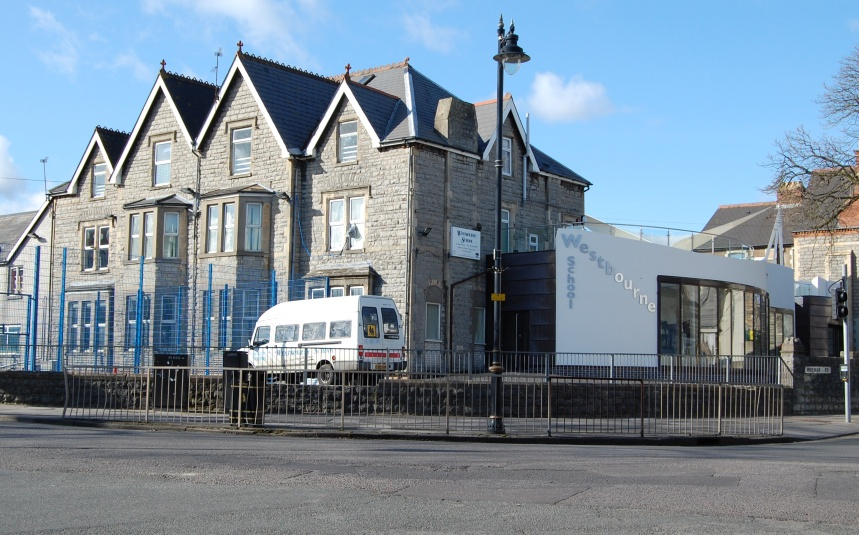
The school in 2009

=== Organisation ===
The Victoria Road facility houses the Pre-School and Prep School. The Senior School and Sixth Form are located in the main school building on the corner of Stanwell and Hickman roads.

Westbourne School also benefits from occasional visiting teachers and tutors from local Cardiff schools, colleges and universities. School facilities include gymnasium, IT suite, library, science laboratories, sports hall as well as access to local sports facilities.

The Pre-School accepts children from their third birthday.

=== Sixth form ===
The Autumn term 2008 saw the establishment of the school's first sixth form, housed in a new Research and Media Centre with its separate sixth form common room and roof terrace, ICT and Computing Department.

According to the school, 90% of students progress to universities ranked among the global top 20.

Voted IB School of the Year 2019 by the Sunday Times, Westbourne is one of the best places in the world to study the IB Diploma Programme. From September 2025, the school announced the introduction of a suite of STEM and Business-focused A Levels.

=== Inspection ===
The school was inspected in 2018 and was awarded the grade of Excellent in every inspection category by ‘’’Estyn’’’

== Notable alumni ==
- Adrian Goldsworthy (born 1969) - is a British historian and military writer.
