= Adrian Goldsworthy =

Welsh historian and author (born 1969)

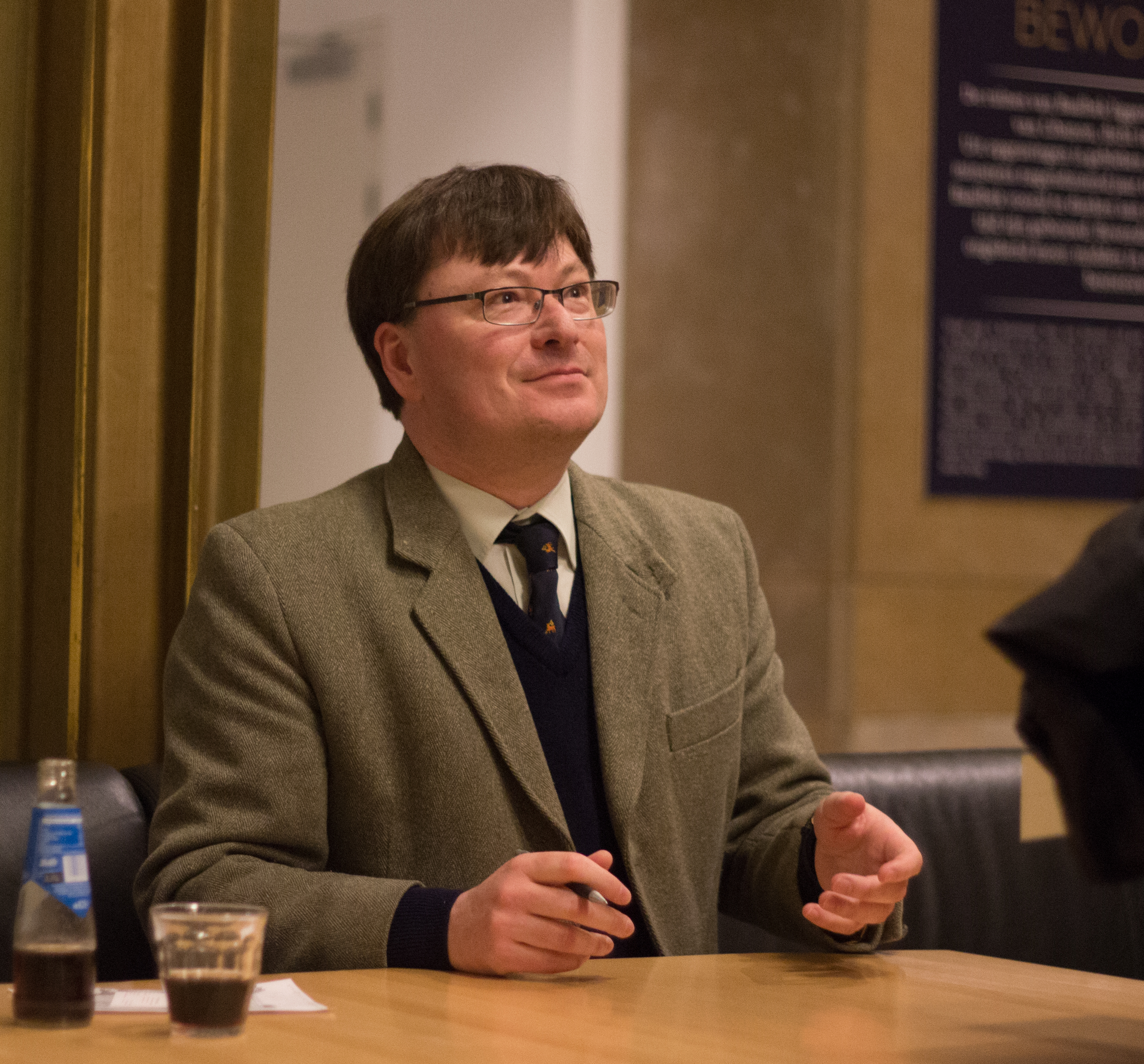
- Goldsworthy in 2016
- Born: Adrian Keith Goldsworthy; 1969 (age 56–57)
- Education: St John's College, Oxford
- Adrian Goldsworthy introducing himself recorded April 2016
- Website: http://www.adriangoldsworthy.com

Adrian Keith Goldsworthy (/ˈɡoʊldzˌwɜːrði/; born 1969) is a British historian and novelist who specialises in ancient Roman history.

== Education ==
Adrian Goldsworthy attended Westbourne School, Penarth. He then read Ancient and Modern History at St John's College, Oxford, completing a D.Phil. in ancient military history from the University of Oxford in 1994. That dissertation laid the foundation of his first book, The Roman Army at War 100 BC – AD 200.

== Career ==
Goldsworthy was appointed a Junior Research Fellow at Cardiff University for two years, taught briefly at King's College London and was an assistant professor on the University of Notre Dame's London programme for six years. His expertise is in Roman history, but he has also taught a course on the military history of the Second World War.

Goldsworthy has appeared on History Channel documentaries and the television game show Time Commanders, serving as an expert on battles being fought by the contestants. He gave a speech about Roman history and politics to the cast of a 2010 Liverpool production of Shakespeare's Antony and Cleopatra.

In 2010 Goldsworthy began writing a series of military novels - based not in Roman times but in the Napoleonic era and concentrating on Wellington's redcoat army, another period in which he has great interest. His first novel, True Soldier Gentlemen, was published by Weidenfeld & Nicolson in 2011 and was followed by Beat the Drums Slowly and Send Me Safely Back Again. The titles of each of his novels are taken from the lyrics of popular military songs of the period.

Asked about his philosophy of life, Goldsworthy responded that he was "English, so obviously do not have a philosophy. I am a Christian, though, if you want to know about important beliefs." Goldsworthy lives in South Wales.

== Works ==
Goldsworthy has written a number of historical works on ancient Rome, especially the Roman army, and nine novels.

=== Nonfiction ===
- The Roman Army at War 100 BC – AD 200 (OUP, 1996)
- Roman Warfare (Cassell, 2000) ISBN 0-304-35265-9
- The Punic Wars (Cassell, 2000) ISBN 0-304-35967-X
  - Reprint title: The Fall of Carthage: The Punic Wars 265–146 BC, (Cassell, 2003) ISBN 978-0-304-36642-2
- Fields of Battle: Cannae (Orion, 2001) ISBN 0-304-35714-6
- Caesar's Civil War: 49–44 BC (2002), Osprey Publishing
- In the Name of Rome: The Men Who Won the Roman Empire (Orion, 2003) ISBN 0-7538-1789-6
- The Complete Roman Army (Thames & Hudson, 2003) ISBN 0-500-05124-0
- Caesar, Life of a Colossus, (Yale University Press, 2006) ISBN 0-300-12048-6
- The Fall of the West: The Slow Death of the Roman Superpower (Orion 2009)
  - U.S. title: How Rome Fell: Death of a Superpower, (Yale University Press, 2009) ISBN 0-300-13719-2
- Antony and Cleopatra (2010); Yale University Press
- Augustus: First Emperor of Rome, (Yale University Press, 2014) ISBN 0-300-17872-7 (Reissued in hardcover by Basic Books in 2026)
- Pax Romana: War, Peace and Conquest in the Roman World, (Orion Publishing Co, 2016) 528 p ISBN 0-297-86428-9
- Hadrian's Wall (Basic Books, 2018). ISBN 978-1-541-64442-7
- Philip and Alexander: Kings and Conquerors (Head of Zeus, 2020)
- The Eagle and the Lion: Rome, Persia and an Unwinnable Conflict (Head of Zeus, 2023) ISBN 978-1-838-93195-7
  - U.S. title: Rome and Persia: The Seven Hundred Year Rivalry, (Basic Books, 2023) ISBN 978-1-541-61996-8
- Athens and Sparta: The Rivalry That Shaped Ancient Greece (Basic Books, 2026) ISBN 978-1541619982

=== Novels ===
- Napoleonic Wars Series
  - True Soldier Gentlemen (2011), (George Weidenfeld & Nicolson) ISBN 0-297-86035-6; his first novel
  - Beat the Drums Slowly (2011)
  - Send Me Safely Back Again (2012)
  - All in Scarlet Uniform (2013)
  - Run Them Ashore (2014)
  - Whose Business is to Die (2015)
- Roman Britain Series
  - Vindolanda (Head of Zeus, 2017) ISBN 9781784974701
  - The Encircling Sea (Head of Zeus, 2018) ISBN 9781784978167
  - Brigantia (Head of Zeus, 2019) ISBN 9781784978198
  - The Fort (Head of Zeus, 2021) ISBN 9781789545746
  - The City (Head of Zeus, 2022) ISBN 9781789545784
  - The Wall (Head of Zeus, 2023)
