= Vipsania Agrippina =

First wife of Roman Emperor Tiberius

- Bust of Vipsania (recovered from Leptis Magna, near Khoms, Libya)
- Born: Unknown
- Died: 20 AD (aged 55–56)
- Spouses: Tiberius; Gaius Asinius Gallus
- Issue: by Tiberius; Drusus Julius Caesar by Asinius Gallus; Gaius Asinius Pollio; Marcus Asinius Agrippa; Asinius Saloninus; Servius Asinius Celer; Lucius Asinius Gallus; Gnaeus Asinius Gallus; At least one daughter
- Dynasty: Julio-Claudian
- Father: Marcus Vipsanius Agrippa
- Mother: Attica

Vipsania Agrippina (/ˌæɡrəˈpaɪnə, -ˈpiː-/; unknown – 20 AD) was the first wife of the Emperor Tiberius. She was the daughter of Marcus Vipsanius Agrippa and Attica, thus being a granddaughter of Titus Pomponius Atticus, the best friend of writer Cicero.

== Biography ==
She was betrothed by Augustus and her father to Tiberius, the stepson of Augustus, before her first birthday. They were married around 19 BC. Their son, Drusus Julius Caesar, was born in 14 BC.

Despite Vipsania and Tiberius enjoying a happy marriage, Augustus ordered the two to divorce after the death of Vipsania's father, who was married to Augustus's daughter Julia the Elder. Even though Tiberius wished to remain with Vipsania and held disdain for Julia for her purported unfaithfulness, Augustus engaged him to Julia in order to link Tiberius's growing power to the Julian family. At the time of their divorce, Vipsania was pregnant with a second child, who did not survive.

Tiberius divorced Vipsania against his will in 11 BC, (Note: This was, in Suetonius's words, "non sine magno angore animi " ('not without great mental anguish').) and never ceased to rue his action. On one occasion Tiberius caught sight of Vipsania and followed her with an intent and tearful gaze. Precautions were taken to avoid further embarrassing meetings with her.

In 11 BC she married Gaius Asinius Gallus, a Senator and son of the famous orator Gaius Asinius Pollio. They had at least six sons and maybe one or more daughters. Vipsania Agrippina died in AD 20, a few days after the ovation of her son Drusus, which took place on 28 May.

Tiberius hated Gallus, not least because Gallus falsely claimed that Drusus was his own son. In AD 30, at Tiberius' instigation, the Senate was to declare Gallus a public enemy, and he died in prison in AD 33, of starvation.

== Issue ==
Vipsania and Gallus' known sons were:

- Gaius Asinius Pollio – Consul in 23; exiled as an accuser of a conspiracy and later was put to death on orders from Empress Valeria Messalina.
- Marcus Asinius Agrippa – Consul in 25 and died in the end of 26. Tacitus describes him as "not unworthy of his ancestors". His son Marcus Asinius Marcellus was Consul in 54, at the time when the Emperor Claudius died.
- Asinius Saloninus (possibly Gnaeus Asinius Saloninus, sometimes wrongly called Salonius) – died in 22. Tacitus describes him as an ‘eminent’ person. Saloninus was intended to marry one of the granddaughters of Emperor Tiberius.
- Servius Asinius Celer – was consul suffectus in 38. From Emperor Caligula he purchased a fish at an enormous price. He is mentioned in the satire, by Seneca, The Pumpkinification of Claudius, where he is listed among the many people killed by that emperor; his death probably occurred sometime before mid-47. Asinius Celer seems to have had a daughter by the name of Asinia Agrippina, though her existence is obscure.
- Asinius Gallus (possibly Lucius Asinius Gallus, sometimes wrongly called Gallo) – in 46 he conspired against Claudius and was forced to go into exile. Cassius Dio describes him as being "very small and ugly". Later rehabilitated, he became Consul in 62.
- Gnaeus Asinius – his existence is recorded by the townsfolk of Puteoli, whose patron he was. Nothing else is known about him. It has been proposed that he has been identical with Asinius Saloninus or the foregoing Asinius Gallus but since Asinius Gallus seems to have been Lucius Asinius Gallus who became a Consul in 60, by exclusion of parts Gnaeus Asinius may be the Asinius Saloninus.
- Besides their sons Vipsania and Gallus likely had at least one daughter, but possibly more. Pomponia Graecina was a distinguished lady married to Aulus Plautius, and appears to have been a daughter of a daughter of Vipsania. Plautius was a general in the conquest of Britain, which he received as a military ovation. Nero murdered their son, reportedly because Agrippina the Younger, mother of Nero, was in love with him and encouraged him to bid for the throne.

Tacitus states that Vipsania was the only one of Agrippa's children to die a natural death. She was one of the leading women of her time; and between AD 21 and 23, her son Drusus honored her memory with statues, coins and inscriptions.

== Cultural depictions ==
Robert Graves' novel I, Claudius mentions Tiberius following Vipsania with his eyes after their divorce, referencing what Suetonius records in his Lives of the Twelve Caesars: Life of Tiberius.

The television adaptation went somewhat further, the second episode included a fairly lengthy scene between Tiberius and Vipsania on the eve of her second marriage, with Tiberius upset and regretting their divorce. She was played by Sheila Ruskin.

Deadline announced in December 2022 that Vipsania would be depicted once more on television screens as part of Sky and MGM+’s second season of Domina, played by actress Joelle.
