= Lucius Manlius Capitolinus Imperiosus =

4th-century BCE Roman dictator

Lucius Manlius Capitolinus Imperiosus, A. f. A. n. (or "Lucius Manlius Capitolinus Imperiosus, son of Aulus, grandson of Aulus", see Roman filiation), was a politician of ancient Rome, of the Manlia gens, who lived in the 4th century BCE. He was the father of the noted general of the Roman Republic, Titus Manlius Imperiosus Torquatus, though is described by ancient authors as a "domineering" father, who, in Titus's youth, banished his young son to agricultural labor in the countryside on account of his son's speech disorder.

Manlius was appointed dictator in 363 BCE to perform the rite of clavum fingere to mollify the angry gods, on account of the epidemics of disease and severe flooding that Rome experienced in that year.

The ancient historian Livy wrote that the ritual of taking office required driving a nail into the Temple of Jupiter Optimus Maximus in a religious ritual of atonement, perhaps as an apotropaic magic gesture to ward off sickness.

Livy also writes that Manlius appeared to be more interested in war than in the religious mandate he had been given, which gave rise to the opposition of the Roman Senate, and he was brought to trial for numerous charges in the following year, including his display of cruelty to his own son. His son Titus, when he heard the charges, hastened to Rome and physically threatened the tribune of the plebs Marcus Pomponius with a knife in a (successful) bid to get the charges dropped, which added to Titus's own legend and esteem in the eyes of the Roman people.
