= Quintus Caecilius Epirota =

Quintus Caecilius Epirota (1st Century BC) was a freedman of Atticus, a grammarian, and the first person to initiate the public teaching of Virgil’s poetry.

== Life ==
Atticus had employed Epirota to teach his daughter, but he became suspicious about the tutor’s attitude towards her, and dismissed him. Epirota then found a patron in Gaius Cornelius Gallus, and after the latter’s fall set up his own independent teaching school.

== Works ==
Epirota is best known as the first person to discuss his contemporary, Virgil, in public and in Latin. As Suetonius records, he was “the first to hold extempore discussions in Latin, and the first to begin the practice of reading Vergil and other recent poets”.

== See also ==
- Abelard
- Cornelius Epicadus
- Parthenius of Nicaea
- Verrius Flaccus
