= How Rome Fell =

Book by Adrian Goldsworthy

How Rome Fell: Death of a Superpower
- 2009 Yale University Press book jacket
- Author: Adrian Goldsworthy
- Audio read by: Derek Perkins
- Subject: Rome military and political history 30 B.C.- 476 A.D;; Civil wars.
- Genre: History
- Set in: the Roman Empire 180 AD - 476 AD
- Published: 2009
- Publisher: Yale University Press
- Publication place: United States
- Media type: Print, eBook, Audio book
- Pages: 531
- ISBN: 9780300137194 9780300164268
- OCLC: 262432329
- Website: Official website

How Rome Fell: Death of a Superpower is a nonfiction book by Adrian Goldsworthy. The book was published in 2009 by Yale University Press, New Haven, CT. In his book, Goldsworthy posits what he believes to be the causes for the end of the Roman empire in the West. The narrative discusses the politics and military history of the late Roman empire to underscore Goldsworthy's arguments.

== Synopsis ==
Goldsworthy is a military historian who argues against the idea that the Roman Empire simply changed or transformed. Instead he argues that there was a decline and fall.

However, Goldsworthy says that the fall of the Roman Empire happened gradually, over a long period. His narrative begins with the death of Marcus Aurelius in 180 A.D, when the empire was at its strongest and had the most going for it. From there, he follows the outstanding developments that led to the empire's split in 395 into western and eastern halves. He then chronicles and explains the developments that led to the eventual collapse of the Western Roman Empire and the overthrow of its final emperor in 476. Meanwhile, the Eastern Empire endured for another millennium, becoming the Byzantine Empire.

Goldsworthy also contends that Rome's problems that were related to its eventual demise were not contemporaneously apparent. After all, the empire was gargantuan with a complex civil society. Goldsworthy believes that the true source of the empire's vulnerability to "barbarian" groups like the Goths, Huns, and Vandals lay in its internal instability, particularly the numerous civil wars. He shows that from 235 until the Western Empire's collapse, most decades saw significant internal conflict. During the short period between 235 and 285, more than 60 individuals attempted to seize the throne averaging more than one claimant per year. As a result, emperors were focused on surviving, and much less on governance of the empire.

Hence, Goldsworthy believes that, over time, constant chaos such as civil wars, seizures of power, murders, betrayals, and poor leadership, badly damaged Rome's government. The empire spent its energy and resources fighting itself until it was too weak to handle outside threats. So when barbarian invasions ended the Western Empire in 476, they were really finishing off something already weakened by long-term decline.

=== Chronology ===
For Goldsworthy, the civil wars that followed the assassination of Commodus in 192 AD are the turning point that began the slow decline of the Roman Empire. After which, the mid-third century was a period of continual internal conflict, with assassinations, usurpers, and civil wars. Then with Diocletian coming to power in 284, he was mostly concerned with preventing his own assassination, whereby he divided the provinces, but created a much larger bureaucracy in the process. Goldsworthy saw this larger bureaucracy as also contributing to the empire's decline.

The Battle of Adrianople in 378 is seen as important due to the significant loss of Roman soldiers. However, according to Goldsworthy, the army was still an effective fighting force at the end of the fourth century. Also, regarding the Eastern Empire, Rome was still superior to ancient Persia.

== Reception ==
Below is commentary by reviewers about this book.

Diana Preston, writing for The Washington Post says this book is "meticulously researched, complex and thought-provoking." Also she says that Goldsworthy "finds some disturbing messages about inefficiency and corruption... [along with] selfish desire for personal advancement [overriding] thoughts of the common good, bureaucracies... [losing] touch with their overall purpose and... [about how large and powerful] institutions conceal their errors and inefficiencies."

Marc Tracy, writing for The New York Times says that Goldsworthy tediously narrates every "instance of succession" to prove his thesis. Tracy also says, "Meanwhile, when Goldsworthy notes, 'There is something very depressing about the collapse of Roman power,' one leaps to agree, and wishes he'd spent more time exploring why the thoroughly not-analogous Rome still stirs our passions."

Scott Alan Metzger, writing for the academic journal, The History Teacher, says that this book is "fascinating and retable." He also concludes that "Despite minor weakness, How Rome Fell is an excellent, approachable new account of the late Roman World."

Carolyn Nelson, writing for the academic journal, The Journal of Military History, says that "Goldsworthy's writing is easy to follow, sometimes almost conversational in tone without being overly colloquial. How Rome Fell is both enjoyable and thought-provoking."

== See also ==
- Crisis of the Third Century
- Fall of the Western Roman Empire
