= Titus Pomponius Atticus =

Roman banker, writer and philosopher (c.110 BC – 32 BC)

- Born: Titus Pomponius; November 110 BC
- Died: 31 March 32 BC (aged 77)
- Other name: Quintus Caecilius Pomponianus Atticus
- Spouse: Pilia
- Children: Attica
- Parents: Titus Pomponius (father); Caecilia (mother)

Titus Pomponius Atticus (November 110 BC – 31 March 32 BC; later named Quintus Caecilius Pomponianus Atticus) was a Roman editor, banker, and literary patron, best known for his correspondence and close friendship with the famous Roman statesman Marcus Tullius Cicero. Atticus was from a wealthy family of the equestrian class and had close ties to many other Roman aristocrats, most prominently Cicero.

Cicero considered Atticus his dearest friend, and frequently turned to him for advice on personal, political, and literary matters. As a testament to their relationship, Cicero dedicated his treatise on friendship, de Amicitia, to Atticus. Their correspondence, often written in subtle code to disguise their political observations, is preserved in Epistulae ad Atticum (Letters to Atticus) compiled by Tiro, Cicero's slave (later his freedman) and personal secretary. In addition to the Ciceronian correspondence, a key source for the life of Atticus is a biography written by the Roman historian Cornelius Nepos.

A philhellene, Atticus spent much of his adult life in Greece. Although personally connected to many of the major players in the civil wars that marked the end of the Roman Republic, Atticus always maintained his neutrality, a stance in keeping with his Epicurean philosophical allegiance. He thus managed to sustain a comfortable and peaceable existence during a turbulent period in Roman history, dying of natural causes at 77.

== Biography ==
=== Early life ===
Born Titus Pomponius in Rome c. November 110 BC, Atticus' parents were Titus Pomponius, a wealthy businessman, and Caecilia. His family were equestrians and likely had been members of the prestigious equestrians with public horse (Latin: eques equo publico) for many generations. He had a sister named Pomponia.

Atticus' father supported his education. Among his school friends were three consuls: Cicero (consul in 63 BC), Lucius Manlius Torquatus (consul in 65), and Gaius Marius the Younger (consul in 82). Cicero was educated by tutors chosen by the famous orator Lucius Licinius Crassus; Atticus may have been part of this grouping as well. He is said to have been an excellent student; his education, evidenced by his school friends' political careers, would have prepared him well for Roman public life.

Atticus left Rome, probably to escape civil strife, in 86 BC. According to his biographer Nepos, Atticus was a distant relation of the plebeian tribune Publius Sulpicius Rufus – it is more likely that they were friends – which put him in danger when Sulla took the city. Atticus went to Athens, transferring most of his wealth, and staying away from Rome until around 65 BC. The city was not doing well in the aftermath of its capture by Sulla during the First Mithridatic War. His love of Athens inspired his self-appointed nickname "Atticus", or "Man of Attica", which is mentioned in the fifth book of Cicero's De Finibus. During his visit to Athens, Julius Caesar was Atticus's guest.

=== Career ===
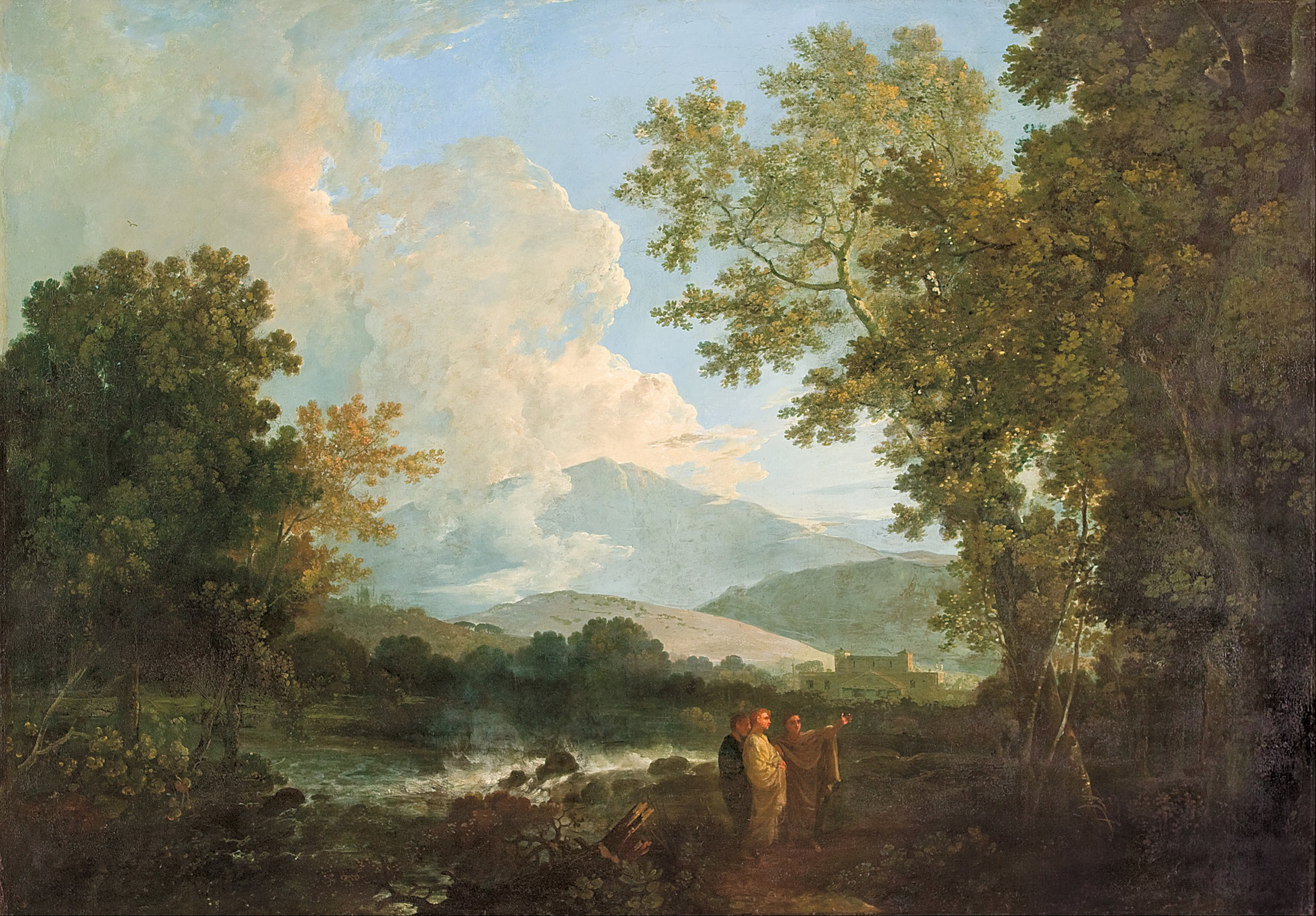
Cicero with his friend Atticus and brother Quintus, at his villa at Arpinum. (Cicero and His Two Friends by Richard Wilson, c. 1771)

Atticus inherited family money, which he successfully invested in real estate, enhancing his wealth. Using his income to support his love of letters, he had trained Roman slaves as scribes and taught them to make papyrus scrolls, allowing Atticus to publish, amongst other things, the works of his friend Cicero. His editions of Greek authors such as Plato, Demosthenes, and Aeschines were prized for their accuracy in the ancient world. None of Atticus's own writings have survived, but he is known to have written one book (in Ancient Greek) on Cicero's consulship, the Liber Annalis (a work on Roman chronology), and a small amount of Roman poetry.

In 65 BC, Atticus returned from Athens to Rome. In keeping with his Epicurean sympathies, he kept out of politics to the greatest extent possible, except to lend Cicero a helping hand in times of peril — for instance, when Cicero was forced to flee the country in 49 BC, Atticus made him a present of 250,000 sesterces. All in all, his political activity was minimal, though we know that, like Cicero, he belonged to the optimates (the aristocratic party), and held generally conservative views. He was also a friend and partner of Marcus Licinius Crassus, a member of the First Triumvirate.

Upon the death of his wealthiest maternal uncle Quintus Caecilius, Atticus became his adopted son and heir, assuming the name Quintus Caecilius Pomponianus Atticus. Lucius Licinius Lucullus, despite being his personal friend, resented Atticus's receiving an inheritance he felt he was entitled to for his association with the campaign against Mithridates and as Governor of Syria.

Atticus was friendly with the Liberators after the assassination of Julius Caesar but was not harmed following their defeat. According to Cornelius Nepos, he took care of Servilia after the death of her son Brutus at the Battle of Philippi.

=== Marriage and children ===
In his later years, he married a relative, Pilia (c. 75 – 46 BC), daughter of Pilius and a maternal granddaughter of the Triumvir Crassus. Atticus and Pilia were married in 58/56 BC, when Atticus was already 53/54 years old, and she probably died in 44 BC. They had a daughter, Attica, who became the first wife of Marcus Vipsanius Agrippa.

=== Death ===
Atticus lived out the remainder of his life in Rome. Just after his 77th birthday he fell ill, and at first his ailment appeared minor. But after three months his health suddenly deteriorated. Deciding to accelerate the inevitable, he abstained from ingesting any nourishment, starving himself to death, and dying on the fifth day of such fasting, "which was the 31st March, in the consulship of Cn. Domitius and C. Sosius", that is in the year 32 BC. He was buried in a family tomb located at the Fifth Mile of the Appian Way.

== See also ==
- Quintus Caecilius Epirota
