= Political career of Cicero =

Marcus Tullius Cicero

Marcus Tullius Cicero
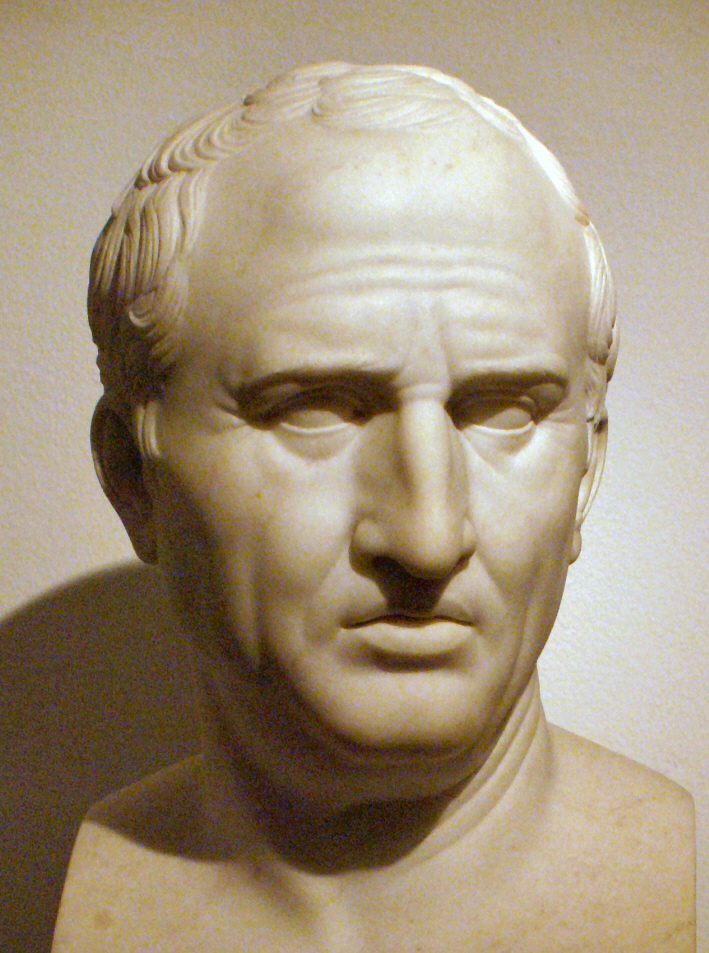
- Born: January 3, 106 BC; Arpinum, Italy
- Died: December 7, 43 BC; Formia, Italy
- Occupations: Politician, lawyer, orator and philosopher
- Writing career
- Subjects: politics, law, philosophy, oratory
- Notable works: Politics: Pro Quinctio; Philosophy: De Oratore
- Movement: Golden Age Latin

The political career of Marcus Tullius Cicero began in 76 BC with his election to the office of quaestor (he entered the Senate in 74 BC after finishing his quaestorship in Lilybaeum, 75 BC), and ended in 43 BC, when he was assassinated upon the orders of Mark Antony. Cicero, a Roman statesman, lawyer, political theorist, philosopher, and Roman constitutionalist, reached the height of Roman power, the Consulship, and played a critical role in the transformation of the Roman Republic into the Roman Empire. A contemporary of Julius Caesar, Cicero is widely considered one of Rome's greatest orators and prose stylists.

Cicero is generally perceived to be one of the most versatile minds of ancient Rome. He introduced the Romans to the chief schools of Greek philosophy and created a Latin philosophical vocabulary, distinguishing himself as a linguist, translator, and philosopher. An impressive orator and successful lawyer, Cicero probably thought his political career his most important achievement. Today, he is appreciated primarily for his humanism and philosophical and political writings. His voluminous correspondence, much of it addressed to his friend Atticus, has been especially influential, introducing the art of refined letter writing to European culture. Cornelius Nepos, the 1st-century BC biographer of Atticus, remarked that Cicero's letters to Atticus contained such a wealth of detail "concerning the inclinations of leading men, the faults of the generals, and the revolutions in the government" that their reader had little need for a history of the period.

During the chaotic middle period of the first century BC, marked by civil wars and the dictatorship of Gaius Julius Caesar, Cicero championed a return to the traditional republican government. However, his career as a statesman was marked by inconsistencies and a tendency to shift his position in response to changes in the political climate. His indecision may be attributed to his sensitive and impressionable personality; he was prone to overreaction in the face of political and private change. "Would that he had been able to endure prosperity with greater self-control and adversity with more fortitude!" wrote C. Asinius Pollio, a contemporary Roman statesman and historian.

== Early career ==
Cicero's childhood dream was "Ever to Excel" (αἰὲν ἀριστεύειν), a line taken from Homer's Iliad. He pursued dignitas (position) and auctoritas (authority), symbolized by the purple-bordered toga praetexta and the Roman lictors' rod. There was just one path to these: public civil service along the steps of cursus honorum. However, in 90 BC he was too young to apply to any of the offices of cursus honorum except to acquire the preliminary experience in warfare that a career in civil service demanded. In 90–88 BC, Cicero served both Gnaeus Pompeius Strabo and Lucius Cornelius Sulla as they campaigned in the Social War, though he had no taste for military life. Cicero was first and foremost an intellectual. Several years later he would write to his friend, Titus Pomponius Atticus who was collecting marble statues for Cicero's villas: "Why do you send me a statue of Mars? You know I am a pacifist!"

Cicero started his career as a lawyer around 83–81 BC. The earliest known case is the Pro Quinctio, a private dispute from 81 BC delivered when Cicero was 26. However, the first major public case of which a written record is still existent was his 80 BC defense of Sextus Roscius on the charge of parricide. Taking this case was a courageous move for Cicero; parricide and matricide were considered appalling crimes, and the people whom Cicero accused of the murder—the most notorious being Chrysogonus—were favorites of Sulla. At this time it would have been easy for Sulla to have Cicero murdered, as Cicero was barely known in the Roman courts. His arguments were divided into three parts: in the first, he defended Roscius and attempted to prove he did not commit the murder; in the second, he attacked those who likely committed the crime—Titus Roscius Capito and Titus Roscius Magnus relatives of the defendant—and stated how the crime benefited them more than Sextus; in the third, he attacked Chrysogonus, stating Roscius' father was murdered to obtain his estate at a cheap price. On the strength of this case, Roscius was acquitted.

Cicero's successful defense was an indirect challenge to the dictator Sulla, whom he again challenged in a lost speech defending the disenfranchised citizens of Arretium. According to Plutarch, Cicero was so fearful of Sulla's anger after Roscius' acquittal that he left for Greece, Asia Minor and Rhodes in 79 BC. However, the delay of around a year, in which time Cicero also married, hardly points to a panicked flight, and Cicero's own explicit explanation of poor health appears much more likely. Accompanying him on his journey were his brother Quintus, his cousin Lucius, and probably Servius Sulpicius Rufus.

Cicero travelled to Athens, where he again met Atticus, who had fled war-torn Italy to Athens in the 80s. Atticus had become an honorary citizen of Athens and introduced Cicero to some significant Athenians. In Athens, Cicero visited the sacred sites of the philosophers. The most important of them was the Academy of Plato, where he conversed with the present head of the Academy, Antiochus of Ascalon. Because Cicero's philosophical stance was very similar to that of the New Academy as represented by Philo of Larissa, he felt that Antiochus had moved too far away from his predecessor. He was also initiated into the Eleusinian Mysteries, which made a strong impression on him, and consulted the Oracle of Delphi. But first and foremost he consulted different rhetoricians in order to learn a less exhausting style of speaking. His chief instructor was Apollonius Molon of Rhodes. He instructed Cicero in a more expansive and less intense (and less strenuous on the throat) form of oratory that would define Cicero's individual style in years to come.

== Entry into politics ==
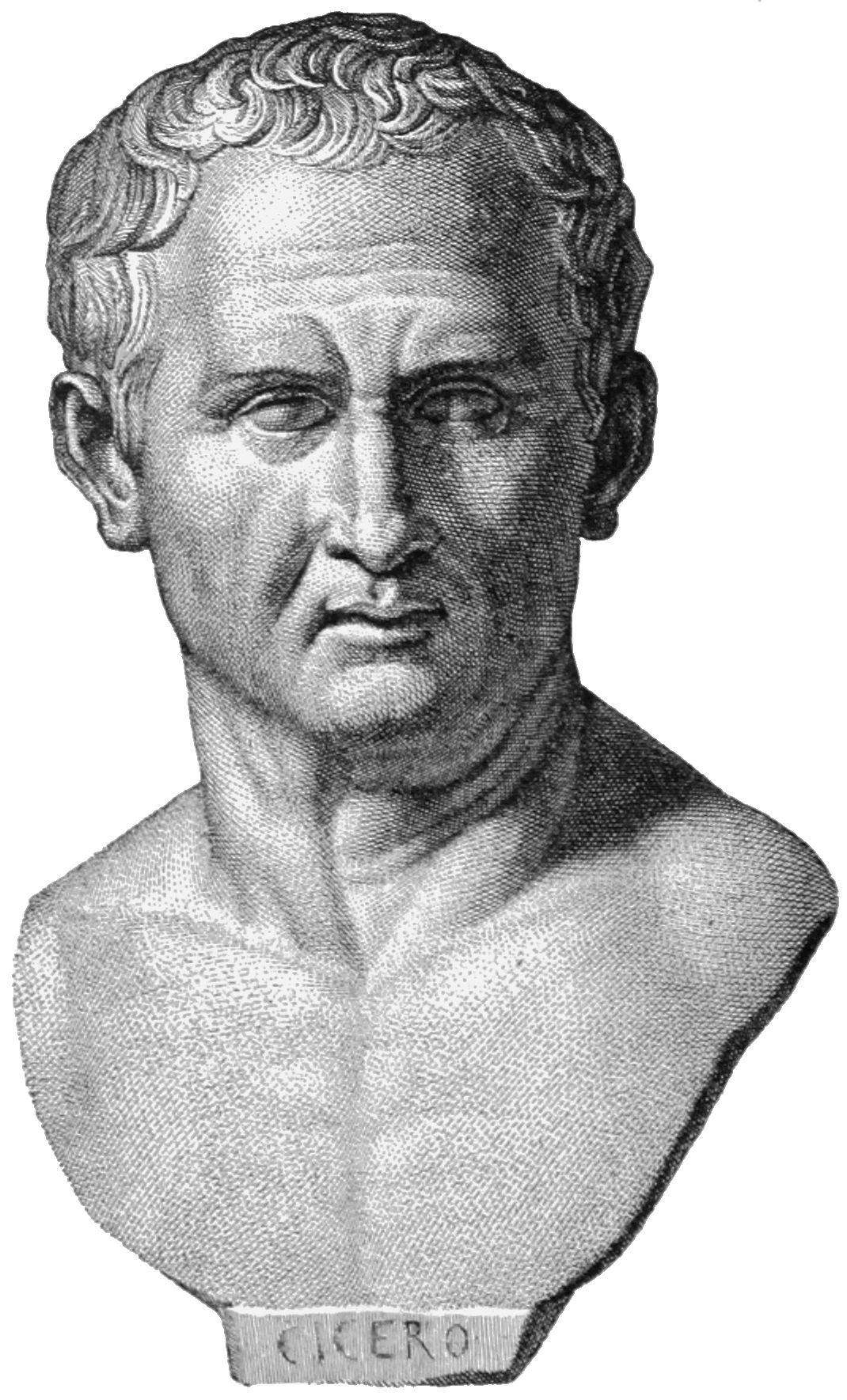
Marcus Tullius Cicero

After his return to Rome, Cicero's reputation rose very quickly, assisting his elevation to office as a quaestor in 75 BC (the next step on the cursus honorum). Quaestors, 20 of whom were elected annually, dealt with the financial administration at Rome or assisted propraetor and proconsul (both governors) in financial matters in one of the provinces of Rome. Cicero served as quaestor in western Sicily in 75 BC and demonstrated honesty and integrity in his dealings with the inhabitants. As a result, the grateful Sicilians became his clients, and he was asked by them to prosecute Gaius Verres, a governor of Sicily, who had badly plundered their homeland.

During his stay in Sicily he discovered, hidden by thick bushes and undergrowth, the tomb of Archimedes of Syracuse, on whose gravestone was carved Archimedes' favourite discovery in geometry: that the ratio of the volume of a sphere to that of the smallest right circular cylinder in which it fits is 2:3.

The prosecution of Gaius Verres in 70 BC was a great forensic success for Cicero. Verres' defense counsel was Rome's greatest lawyer and orator in those days, Quintus Hortensius. Verres was convicted, and he fled into exile. Upon the conclusion of this case, Cicero came to be considered the greatest orator in Rome, surpassing Hortensius. Relations between Hortensius and Cicero remained friendly despite this rivalry.

Oratory was considered a great art in ancient Rome, and a crucial medium for disseminating knowledge and promoting oneself in elections, being the only equivalent to modern press at the time (before Caesar started publishing the Acta Diurna).

Despite his great success as an advocate, Cicero lacked reputable ancestry: he was neither noble nor patrician. A further hindrance was that the last memorable novus homo ("new man") to have been elected consul without consular ancestors had been the politically radical and militarily innovative Gaius Marius—a distant relative of Cicero's who also came from Arpinum.

Cicero grew up in a time of civil unrest and war. Sulla’s victory in the first of many civil wars led to a new constitutional framework that undermined libertas (liberty), the fundamental value of the Roman Republic. Nonetheless, Sulla’s reforms strengthened the position of the equestrian class, contributing to that class’s growing political power. Cicero was both an Italian eques and a novus homo, but more importantly he was a constitutionalist, meaning he did not wish to side with the populares faction and embark on a campaign of "seditious" reform. His social class and loyalty to the Republic ensured he would "command the support and confidence of the people as well as the Italian middle classes." This appeal was undercut by his lack of social standing and a reliable and viable power base, as the equites, his primary base of support, did not hold much power. The optimates faction never truly accepted Cicero, despite his outstanding talents and vision for the security of the Republic. This undermined his efforts to reform the Republic while preserving the constitution. Nevertheless, he was able to successfully ascend the Roman cursus honorum, holding each magistracy at or near the youngest possible age: quaestor in 75 (age 31), aedile in 69 (age 37), (Note: Whether Cicero was elected as plebeian aedile or curule aedile is uncertain: his own writings do not specify which, but it may be deduced, from the classes of public games he mounted, that he probably filled the plebeian role—he was responsible for a festival identified as a Ludi Plebeii. There is no record that he was responsible for a celebration of Ludi Romani, the ancient and more esteemed gatherings reserved to the holders of the curule chair.) praetor in 66 (age 40), and finally consul in 63 (age 43).

=== Praetor ===
Cicero's popularity approached its heights during his aedileship and the subsequent years when he eclipsed Quintus Hortensius as Rome's leading orator. Consequently, he was not only elected to all the chief offices at the first attempt and the minimum permitted age (always a difficult task for a novus homo without noble or even senatorial ancestry), but returned first of all the candidates he stood against every time. That was rarely achieved even by sons of the highest and wealthiest noble families and underlines the genuine depth and breadth of Cicero's popularity among Romans of all but the poorest classes. This unprecedented phenomenon for a "new man" is perhaps best underlined by the elections in 67 BC for the praetors of 66. There were eight annual praetorships and many more candidates than positions as the praetorship was the last and most important qualification to stand for the greatest prize of all, the consulate. In 67 the praetorian elections were suspended twice in mid course before finally being completed, and thus held three times in all in the early voting stages. Cicero was elected in first place on all three occasions, and with the support of every voting unit (centuria).

This represents a "perfect" electoral record, in the sense that it could not be bettered. This had probably not happened before for a novus homo and is very important in understanding Cicero's political success and rapidly growing self-confidence as well as a simultaneous rising tide of personal jealousy and hostility towards him among the nobility.

== Consul ==
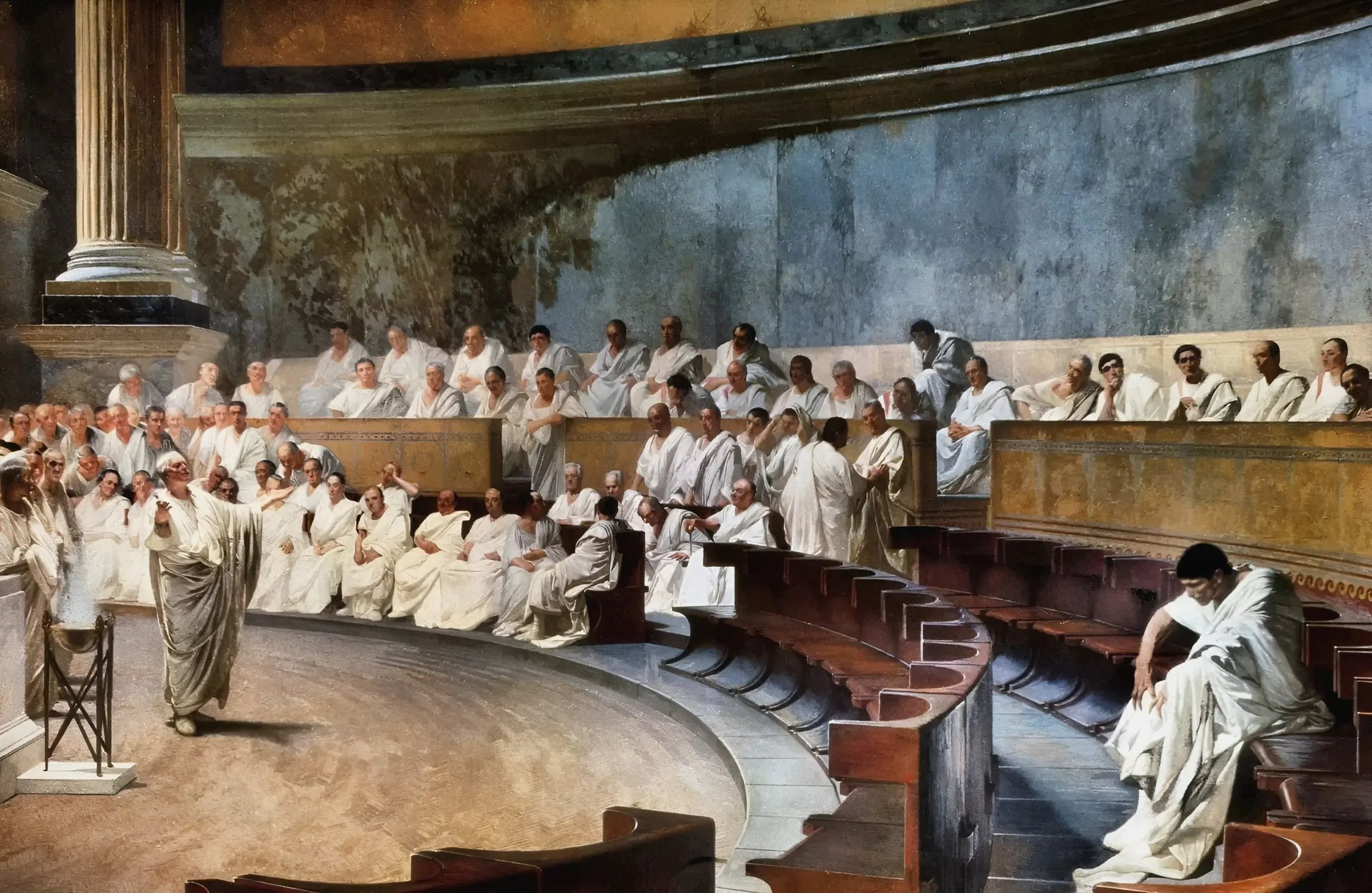
Cicero Denounces Catiline, fresco by Cesare Maccari, 1882–1888.

Cicero was elected Consul for the year 63 BC, defeating patrician candidate Lucius Sergius Catilina (Catiline). During his year in office he thwarted a conspiracy, which he claims aimed to overthrow the Roman Republic, led by Catiline. Cicero procured a Senatus Consultum de Re Publica Defendenda (a declaration of martial law, also called the Senatus Consultum Ultimum), and he drove Catiline from the city with four vehement speeches which came to be known as the Catiline Orations. The Orations listed Catiline and his followers' debaucheries, and denounced Catiline's senatorial sympathizers as roguish and dissolute debtors, clinging to Catiline as a final and desperate hope. Cicero demanded that Catiline and his followers leave the city. At the conclusion of his first speech, Catiline burst from the Temple of Jupiter Stator, where the Senate had convened, and made his way to Etruria. In his following speeches Cicero did not directly address Catiline but instead addressed the Senate. By these speeches Cicero wanted to prepare the Senate for the worst possible case; he also delivered more evidence against Catiline.

Catiline fled and left behind his followers to start the revolution from within while Catiline assaulted the city with an army recruited from among Sulla’s veterans in Etruria. Many peasant farmers who were racked by debt also supported Catiline in the countryside. These five parties had attempted to involve the Allobroges, a tribe of Transalpine Gaul, in their plot, but Cicero, working with the Gauls, was able to seize letters which incriminated the five conspirators and forced them to confess their crimes in front of the Senate.

The Senate then deliberated upon the conspirators' punishment. As it was the dominant advisory body to the various legislative assemblies rather than a judicial body, there were limits to its power; however, martial law was in effect, and it was feared that simple house arrest or exile—the standard options—would not remove the threat to the state. First, Decimus Junius Silanus was asked his opinion and proposed life imprisonment and that the conspirators should be made to suffer the "extremest punishments"; many acceded to his opinion, but then many were swayed when the matter came to a young Julius Caesar, who decried the precedent it would set and argued in favor of life imprisonment in various Italian towns of Cicero's choosing and the confiscation of all of their personal property. Lutatius Catulus then opposed Caesar's proposal and Cato followed him—rising in defense of the death penalty and slated Caesar for his proposed leniency and accused him of involvement, and with that the Senate were swayed and agreed on Cato's proposal. Cicero had the conspirators taken to the Tullianum, the notorious Roman prison, where they were strangled. Cicero himself accompanied the former consul Publius Cornelius Lentulus Sura, one of the conspirators, to the Tullianum. After the executions had been carried out, Cicero seeing many members of the conspiracy still assembled in the forum, announced the deaths by the formulaic expression vixerunt ("they have lived"), which was meant to ward off ill fortune by avoiding the direct mention of death.

Consequently, Cicero partly due to the help of Cato received the honorific Pater Patriae for his efforts to suppress the conspiracy, but lived thereafter in fear of trial or exile for having put Roman citizens to death without trial. He also received the first public thanksgiving for a civic accomplishment; previously this had been a purely military honor. Cicero's four Catiline Orations remain outstanding examples of his rhetorical style.

== Exile and return ==
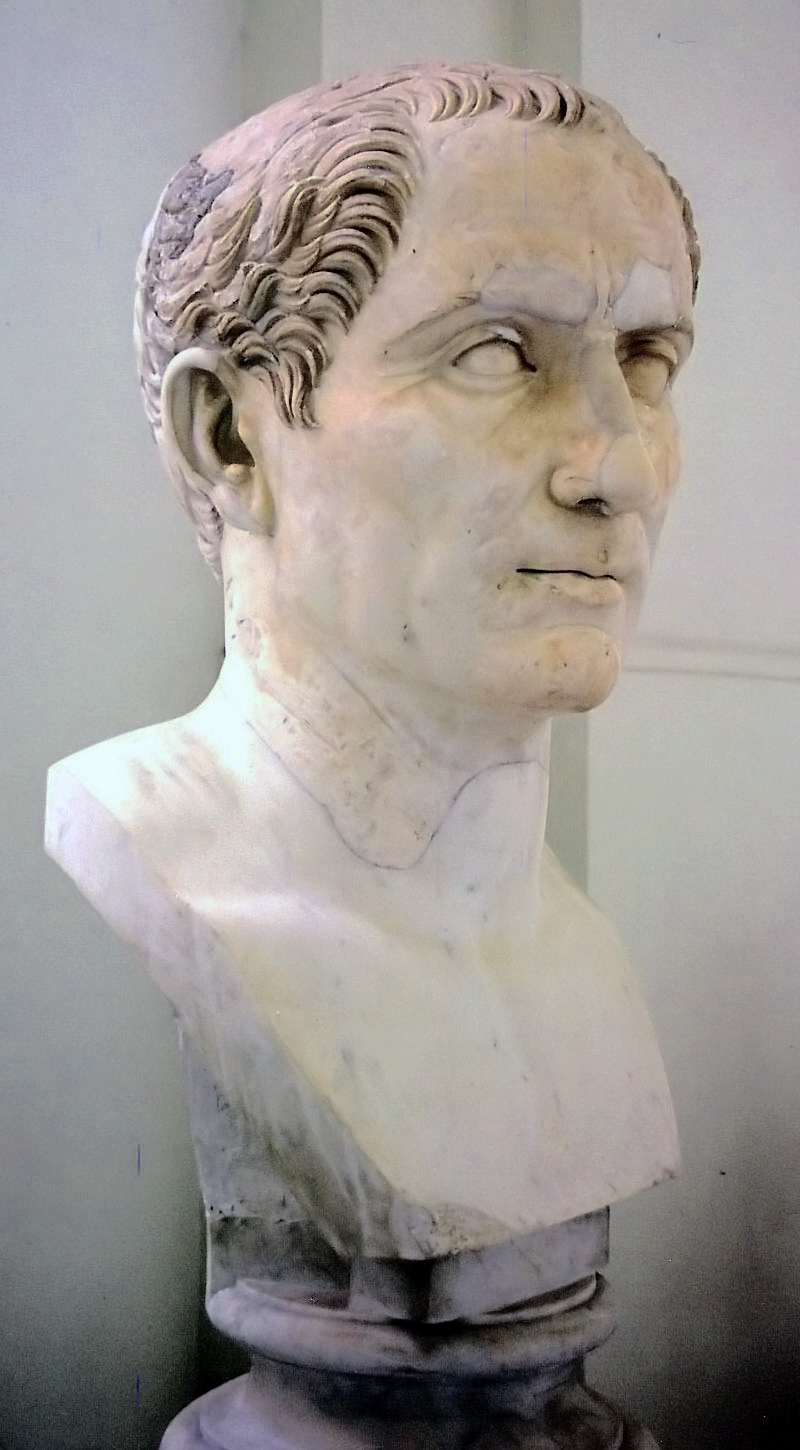
Gaius Julius Caesar.

In 61 BC, Julius Caesar invited Cicero to be the fourth member of his existing partnership with Pompey and Marcus Licinius Crassus, an assembly that would eventually be called the First Triumvirate. Cicero refused the invitation because he suspected it would undermine the Republic.

In 58 BC, the demagogue Publius Clodius Pulcher, the tribune of the plebs, introduced a law threatening exile to anyone who executed a Roman citizen without a trial. Cicero, having executed members of the Catilinarian conspiracy four years before without formal trial, and having had a public falling-out with Clodius, was clearly the intended target of the law. Cicero argued that the senatus consultum ultimum indemnified him from punishment, and he attempted to gain the support of the senators and consuls, especially of Pompey. When help was not forthcoming, he went into exile. He arrived at Thessalonica, Greece on 23 May 58 BC. The day Cicero left Italy, Clodius proposed another bill which forbade Cicero approaching within 400 miles (640 km) of Italy and confiscated his property. The bill was passed forthwith, and Cicero's villa on the Palatine was destroyed by Clodius' supporters, as were his villas in Tusculum and Formiae.

Cicero's exile caused him to fall into depression. He wrote to Atticus: "Your pleas have prevented me from committing suicide. But what is there to live for? Don't blame me for complaining. My afflictions surpass any you ever heard of earlier". In another letter to Atticus, Cicero suggested that the Senate was jealous of him, and this was why they declined to recall him from exile. In a later letter to his brother Quintus, he named several factors he believed contributed to his exile: "the defection of Pompey, the hostility of the senators and judges, the timidity of equestrians, the armed bands of Clodius." Atticus borrowed 25,000 sestertii for Cicero's cause and, with Cicero's wife Terentia, attempted to recall him from exile.

Cicero returned from exile on 5 August 57 BC and landed in Brundisium (modern Brindisi). He was greeted by a cheering crowd, and, to his delight, his beloved daughter Tullia. Elated, he returned to Rome, where some time later the Senate passed a resolution restoring his property and ordered reparations to be paid for damages done to him.

During the 50s BC Cicero supported Milo, who at the time was Clodius' chief opponent. Clodius typically drew his political support from armed mobs and political violence, and he was slain by Milo's gladiators on the Via Appia in 52 BC. Clodius' relatives brought charges of murder against Milo, who appealed to Cicero for advocacy. Cicero took the case, and his speech Pro Milone came to be considered by some as his crowning masterpiece.

In Pro Milone, Cicero argued that Milo had no reason to kill Clodius—indeed, Cicero proposed, Milo had everything to gain from Clodius being alive. Furthermore, he asserted that Milo did not expect to encounter Clodius on the Via Appia. The prosecution pointed out that the few living witnesses to the murder were Milo's slaves, and that by subsequently freeing them, Milo had cynically ensured no witness would testify against him. Though Cicero suggested that the slaves' valiant defence of Milo was cause enough for their emancipation, he ultimately lost the case. After the trial, Milo went into exile and continued to live in Massilia until he returned to stir up trouble in the Civil War.

== Civil War, opposition to Mark Antony ==
The struggle between Pompey and Julius Caesar grew more intense in 50 BC. Cicero, rather forced to pick sides, chose to favour Pompey, but at the same time he prudently avoided openly alienating Caesar. When Caesar invaded Italy in 49 BC, Cicero fled Rome. Caesar, seeking the legitimacy that endorsement by a senior senator would provide, courted Cicero's favour, but even so Cicero slipped out of Italy and in June traveled to Dyrrachium (Epidamnos), Illyria, where Pompey's staff was situated. Cicero traveled with the Pompeian forces to Pharsalus in 48 BC, though he was quickly losing faith in the competence and righteousness of the Pompeian lot. He quarrelled with many of the commanders, including a son of Pompey himself. Eventually, he even provoked the hostility of his fellow senator Cato, who told him that he would have been of more use to the cause of the optimates if he had stayed in Rome. In Cicero's own words: "I came to regret my action in joining the army of the optimates not so much for the risk of my own safety as for the appalling situation which confronted me on arrival. To begin with, our forces were too small and had poor morale. Secondly, with the exception of the commander-in-chief and a handful of others, everyone was greedy to profit from the war itself and their conversation was so bloodthirsty that I shuddered at the prospect of victory. In a word everything was wrong except the cause we were fighting for." After Caesar's victory at the Battle of Pharsalus, Cicero returned to Rome only very cautiously. Caesar pardoned him and Cicero tried to adjust to the situation and maintain his political work, hoping that Caesar might revive the Republic and its institutions.

In a letter to Varro on c. 20 April 46 BC, Cicero outlined his strategy under Caesar's dictatorship: "I advise you to do what I am advising myself—avoid being seen even if we cannot avoid being talked about. If our voices are no longer heard in the Senate and in the Forum, let us follow the example of the ancient sages and serve our country through our writings concentrating on questions of ethics and constitutional law".

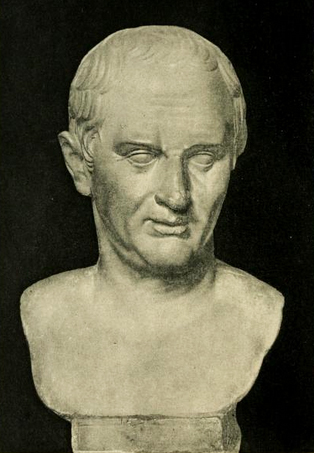
Cicero around age 60, from a marble bust

Cicero was taken completely by surprise when the Liberatores assassinated Caesar on the Ides of March, 44 BC. Cicero was not involved in the conspiracy, even though the conspirators were sure of his sympathy. Marcus Junius Brutus called out Cicero's name, asking him to "restore the Republic" when he lifted the bloodstained dagger after the assassination. A letter Cicero wrote in February 43 BC to Trebonius, one of the conspirators, began, "How I could wish that you had invited me to that most glorious banquet on the Ides of March"! Cicero became a popular leader during the period of instability following the assassination. He had no respect for Mark Antony, who was scheming to take revenge upon Caesar's murderers. In exchange for amnesty for the assassins, he arranged for the Senate to agree not to declare Caesar to have been a tyrant, which allowed the Caesarians to have lawful support.

Cicero and Antony then became the two leading men in Rome; Cicero as spokesman for the Senate (he was appointed princeps senatus) and Antony as consul, leader of the Caesarian faction, and unofficial executor of Caesar's public will. The two men had never been on friendly terms and their relationship worsened after Cicero made it clear that he felt Antony to be taking unfair liberties in interpreting Caesar's wishes and intentions. When Octavian, Caesar's heir and adopted son, arrived in Italy in April, Cicero formed a plan to play him against Antony. In September he began attacking Antony in a series of speeches he called the Philippicae, in honour of his inspiration—Demosthenes. Praising Octavian to the skies, he labelled him a "god-sent child" and said that the young man only desired honour and would not make the same mistake as his adoptive father. Meanwhile, his attacks on Antony, whom he called a "sheep", rallied the Senate in firm opposition to Antony. During this time, Cicero's popularity as a public figure was unrivalled and according to the historian Appian, he "had the [most] power any popular leader could possibly have". Cicero heavily fined the supporters of Antony for petty charges and had volunteers forge arms for the supporters of the Republic. According to Appian, although the story is not supported by others, this policy was perceived by Antony's supporters to be so insulting that they prepared to march on Rome to arrest Cicero. Cicero fled the city and the plan was abandoned.

== Death ==
Cicero supported Decimus Junius Brutus Albinus as governor of Cisalpine Gaul (Gallia Cisalpina) and urged the Senate to name Antony an enemy of the state. One tribune, a certain Salvius, delayed these proceedings and was "reviled", as Appian put it, by Cicero and his party. The speech of Lucius Piso, Caesar's father-in-law, delayed proceedings against Antony. Antony was later declared an enemy of the state when he refused to lift the siege of Mutina, which was in the hands of Decimus Brutus. Cicero described his position in a letter to Cassius, one of Caesar's assassins, that same September: "I am pleased that you like my motion in the Senate and the speech accompanying it. Antony is a madman; corrupt and much worse than Caesar whom you declared the worst of evil men when you killed him. Antony wants to start a bloodbath".

Cicero's plan to drive out Antony failed, however. After the successive battles of Forum Gallorum and Mutina, Antony and Octavian reconciled and allied with Lepidus to form the Second Triumvirate. Immediately after legislating their alliance into official existence for a five-year term with consular imperium, the Triumvirate began proscribing their enemies and potential rivals. Cicero and his younger brother Quintus Tullius Cicero, formerly one of Caesar's legati, and all of their contacts and supporters were numbered among the enemies of the state though, reportedly, Octavian argued for two days against Cicero being added to the list.

Among the proscribed, Cicero was one of the most viciously and doggedly hunted. Other victims included the tribune Salvius, who, after siding with Antony, moved his support directly and fully to Cicero. Cicero was viewed with sympathy by a large segment of the public and many people refused to report that they had seen him. He was caught December 7, 43 BC leaving his villa in Formiae in a litter going to the seaside from where he hoped to embark on a ship to Macedonia. When the assassins arrived his own slaves said they had not seen him, but he was given away by Philologus, a freed slave of his brother Quintus Cicero.

Cicero's last words were said to have been, "There is nothing proper about what you are doing, soldier, but do try to kill me properly." He was decapitated by his pursuers. Once discovered, he bowed to his captors, leaning his head out of the litter in a gladiatorial gesture to ease the task. By baring his neck and throat to the soldiers, he was indicating that he wouldn't resist. His hands were cut off as well and nailed and displayed along with the head on the Rostra in the Roman Forum according to the tradition of Marius and Sulla, both of whom had displayed the heads of their enemies in the Forum. He was the only victim of the Triumvirate's proscriptions to be displayed in that manner. According to Cassius Dio (in a story often mistakenly attributed to Plutarch), Antony's wife Fulvia took Cicero's head, pulled out his tongue, and jabbed it repeatedly with her hairpin in final revenge against Cicero's power of speech.

Cicero's son, Marcus Tullius Cicero Minor, during his year as a joint consul with Octavian in 30 BC, avenged his father's death somewhat when he announced to the Senate Mark Antony's naval defeat at Actium in 31 BC by Octavian and his capable commander-in-chief Agrippa. In the same meeting the Senate voted to prohibit all future Antonius descendants from using the name Marcus, the removal of all remaining statues of Antony and to make void any other honors that had been paid him.

Many years later, Octavian came upon one of his grandsons reading a book by Cicero. The boy, terrified, sought to hide it in his gown but Octavian (then called Augustus) saw it, took the book from him, and read a great part of it as he stood, and then handed the volume back, saying: "A learned man, my child, a learned man and a lover of his country".

== Legacy ==
After the civil war, Cicero recognised that the end of the Republic was almost certain. He stated that "the Republic, the Senate, the law courts are mere ciphers and that not one of us has any constitutional position at all." The civil war had destroyed the Republic. It wreaked destruction and decimated resources throughout the Roman Empire. Julius Caesar's victory had been absolute. Caesar's assassination failed to reinstate the Republic, despite further attacks on the Romans’ freedom by "Caesar’s own henchman, Mark Antony." His death only highlighted the stability of ‘one man rule’ by the ensuing chaos and further civil wars that broke out with Caesar's murderers, Brutus and Cassius, and finally between his own supporters, Mark Antony and Octavian.

Cicero remained the "Republic's last true friend" as he spoke out for his ideals and of the libertas (freedom) the Romans enjoyed for centuries. Cicero's vision had some fundamental flaws. It harked back to a ‘golden age’ that may never have existed. Cicero's idea of the concordia ordinum was too idealistic. Also, Roman institutions had failed to keep pace with Rome's enormous expansion. The Republic had reached such a state of disrepair that regardless of Cicero's talents and passion, Rome lacked "persons loyal to [the Republic] to trust with armies." Cicero lacked the political power and any military skill or resources, to enforce his ideal. To enforce republican values and institutions was ipso facto contrary to republican values. He also failed to a certain extent to recognize the real power structures that operated in Rome.

== In popular culture ==
=== Appearances in modern fiction, listed in order of publication ===
- Julius Caesar, by William Shakespeare
- Ides of March, (1948) an epistolary novel by Thornton Wilder
- À rebours, by Joris-Karl Huysmans
- A Pillar of Iron, (1965) a fictionalized biography, by Taylor Caldwell
- Masters of Rome series, by Colleen McCullough; Cicero first appears as a precocious young boy in The Grass Crown
- Roma Sub Rosa series, (1991–2005), by Steven Saylor
- Robert Olen Butler imagines Cicero's last thoughts as a short monologue in Severance (2006)
- A trilogy of novels by Robert Harris covering the life of Cicero as told by his secretary/slave Tiro
  - Imperium (2006) begins with the prosecution of Verres and leads up to Cicero's election to consul
  - Lustrum (2009) (titled Conspirata in the United States and Italy) covers Cicero's time as consul through his exile in 58
  - Dictator (2015)

=== Appearances in film and television ===
- Imperium: Augustus, a British-Italian film (2003), also shown as Augustus The First Emperor in some countries, where Cicero (played by Gottfried John) appears in several vignettes.
- In the 2005 ABC miniseries Empire, Cicero (played by Michael Byrne) appears as a supporter of Octavius. This portrayal deviates sharply from history, as Cicero survives the civil war to witness Octavius assume the title of princeps.
- The HBO/BBC2 TV series Rome features Marcus Tullius Cicero prominently and is played by David Bamber. The portrayal broadly adheres to the historical record, reflecting Cicero's political indecision and continued switching of allegiances between the various factions in Rome's civil war. A disparity occurs in his assassination, which occurs in an orchard rather than on the road to the sea. The TV series also depicts Cicero's assassination at the hands of the fictionalized Titus Pullo, though the historical Titus Pullo was not Cicero's actual killer.

== See also ==
- Personal life of Cicero
- Marcus Tullius Tiro
- Lorem ipsum

== Bibliography ==
- Cicero, Marcus Tullius, Cicero's letters to Atticus, Vol, I, II, IV, VI, Cambridge University Press, Great Britain, 1965
- Cicero, Marcus Tullius, Latin extracts of Cicero on Himself, translated by Charles Gordon Cooper, University of Queensland Press, Brisbane, 1963
- Cicero, Marcus Tullius, Selected Political Speeches, Penguin Books Ltd, Great Britain, 1969
- Cicero, Marcus Tullius, Selected Works, Penguin Books Ltd, Great Britain, 1971
- Everitt, Anthony 2001, Cicero: the life and times of Rome's greatest politician, Random House, hardback, 359 pages, ISBN 0-375-50746-9
- Cowell, Cicero and the Roman Republic, Penguin Books Ltd, Great Britain, 1973
- Haskell, H.J.: (1946) This was Cicero, Fawcett publications, Inc. Greenwich, Conn.
- Gibbon, Edward. (1793). The Decline and Fall of the Roman Empire., The Modern Library (2003), ISBN 0-375-75811-9. Edited, Abridged, and with a Critical Foreword by Hans-Friedrich Mueller.
- Gruen, Erich, The last Generation of the Roman Republic, University of California Press, 1974
- March, Duane A., "Cicero and the 'Gang of Five'," Classical World, volume 82 (1989) 225–34
- Plutarch, Fall of the Roman Republic, Penguin Books Ltd, Great Britain, 1972
- Rawson, Elizabeth (1975) Cicero, A portrait, Allen Lane, London ISBN 0-7139-0864-5
- Rawson, Elizabeth, Cicero, Penguin Books Ltd, Great Britain, 1975
- Scullard, H. H. From the Gracchi to Nero, University Paperbacks, Great Britain, 1968
- Smith, R. E., Cicero the Statesman, Cambridge University Press, Great Britain, 1966
- Strachan-Davidson, J. L., Cicero and the Fall of the Roman Republic, University of Oxford Press, London, 1936
- Taylor, H. (1918). Cicero: A sketch of his life and works. Chicago: A. C. McClurg & Co.
- Taylor, Lily Ross (1939). "Cicero's Aedileship". The American Journal of Philology. 60 (2): 194–202. doi:10.2307/291199. ISSN 0002-9475.
