= Gregory Doran =

British theatre director (born 1958)

Sir Gregory Doran
- Born: Gregory Doran; 24 November 1958 (age 67); Huddersfield, England
- Education: Preston Catholic College; Bristol University; Bristol Old Vic Theatre School
- Occupations: Theatre director, actor
- Spouse: Anthony Sher (m. 2015; died 2021)

Sir Gregory Doran (born 24 November 1958) is an English theatre director known for directing the work of William Shakespeare. The Sunday Times called him "one of the great Shakespearians of his generation".

Doran was artistic director of the Royal Shakespeare Company (RSC), succeeding Michael Boyd in September 2012. In an interview, announcing his appointment, Doran said that whilst Boyd had concentrated on the "Company", he would be concentrating on the "Shakespeare" in the Royal Shakespeare Company logo. Since April 2022, he is director emeritus at the Royal Shakespeare Company.

Doran's notable productions include a production of Macbeth starring Antony Sher, which was filmed for Channel 4 in 2001, as well as Hamlet in 2008, starring David Tennant and Patrick Stewart.

== Early life and education ==
Doran was born in Huddersfield, but his family moved to Preston, Lancashire when he was six months old, for his father to take a post with the United Kingdom Atomic Energy Authority. He has a twin sister Ruth, to whom he is very close.

Doran was educated at St Pius X Catholic Preparatory School and Preston Catholic College. He attended Bristol University studying English and Drama, where he set up his own theatre company with fellow student Chris Grady, presenting Shakespeare and related classics. He then trained as an actor at the Bristol Old Vic Theatre School.

Doran received an honorary doctorate from Bristol University in July 2011 and an Honorary Degree from the University of Warwick in July 2013.

== Career ==
Doran left the Bristol Old Vic School early having been invited to direct A Midsummer Night's Dream at Jamestown Community College in upstate New York. He then went to Nottingham Playhouse as an actor, before becoming Assistant Director then Associate Director, directing his own productions, including Waiting for Godot and Long Day's Journey into Night.

After a very brief acting career in TV, Doran joined the Royal Shakespeare Company in 1987 initially as an actor (as Solanio in The Merchant of Venice and Octavius Caesar in Julius Caesar) then became Assistant Director the following season.

Doran directed his first RSC production in 1992, commissioning Derek Walcott to write an adaptation of Homer's Odyssey which was performed at The Other Place.

In 1995 Doran directed his partner Antony Sher in the lead role of Titus Andronicus at the Market Theatre, Johannesburg, South Africa. This controversial production, which toured to the National Theatre, is the subject of their book, Woza Shakespeare!

Doran returned to the RSC in 1996, becoming an Associate Director, and directing Jane Lapotaire, Ian Hogg and Paul Jesson in All is True (or Henry VIII), his first Shakespeare for the company. Since then, Doran has directed over half of Shakespeare's plays for the RSC.

Doran took compassionate leave from his role at the RSC in September 2021 to care for his husband, Antony Sher, who was terminally ill. His deputy, Erica Whyman, became acting artistic director. The RSC announced Doran was formally stepping down as artistic director in April 2022, becoming artistic director emeritus until the end of 2023.

=== TV and books ===
Doran contributed to Michael Wood's BBC series In Search of Shakespeare, and filmed a documentary for BBC Four, called A Midsummer Night's Dreaming.

In 2009, Doran's Shakespeare Almanac was published.

== Personal life ==
Doran and his frequent collaborator Antony Sher were in a relationship from 1987, and entered into a civil partnership in 2005. They married 10 years after their civil partnership, on 30 December 2015. Sher died in December 2021.

Doran was appointed Knight Bachelor in the 2024 New Year Honours for services to the Arts.

Doran appeared as a castaway on the BBC Radio 4 programme Desert Island Discs on 29 June 2025.

== Theatre productions ==
=== RSC productions ===
Year	Production	Playwright	Venue	Notes
1999	The Winter's Tale	William Shakespeare	Royal Shakespeare Theatre	
1999	Timon of Athens	William Shakespeare	Royal Shakespeare Theatre	with Michael Pennington
2000	Macbeth	William Shakespeare	Swan Theatre, Stratford-upon-Avon	also made into a Channel 4 film
2001	King John	William Shakespeare	Swan Theatre, Stratford-upon-Avon	
2002	Much Ado About Nothing	William Shakespeare	Royal Shakespeare Theatre	with Harriet Walter and Nicholas le Prevost
2002				Doran supervised a season of seldom-performed Jacobean plays, including the debatedly Shakespearean Edward III and works by Philip Massinger, John Fletcher, Ben Jonson, John Marston and George Chapman which earned Doran a Laurence Olivier Award for Outstanding Achievement of the Year
2003	Taming of the Shrew	William Shakespeare	Royal Shakespeare Theatre	
2003	The Tamer Tamed	John Fletcher	Swan Theatre, Stratford-upon-Avon	with Alexandra Gilbreath and Jasper Britton
2003	All's Well That Ends Well	William Shakespeare	Swan Theatre, Stratford-upon-Avon	with Judi Dench, in her first time back at the RSC for 25 years
2004	Othello	William Shakespeare	Swan Theatre, Stratford-upon-Avon	with Antony Sher and Sello Maake Ncube
2004	Venus & Adonis	William Shakespeare	Royal Shakespeare Theatre	Puppet based performance
2005	A Midsummer Night's Dream	William Shakespeare	Royal Shakespeare Theatre	
2006	Antony and Cleopatra	William Shakespeare	Swan Theatre, Stratford-upon-Avon	with Harriet Walter and Patrick Stewart, who both returned to the RSC after 24 years
2006	Merry Wives The Musical	Based on the play by William Shakespeare, adapted by Gregory Doran, music by Paul Englishby, lyrics by Ranjit Bolt	Royal Shakespeare Theatre	with Judi Dench and Simon Callow
2007	Coriolanus	William Shakespeare	Royal Shakespeare Theatre	with Will Houston, Janet Suzman and Timothy West which toured to Madrid and Washington DC (the final production in the Royal Shakespeare Theatre before it closed for redevelopment, re-opening in winter 2010/11)
2007	Venus & Adonis	William Shakespeare	Swan Theatre, Stratford-upon-Avon	Revival of 2004 production
2008	A Midsummer Night's Dream	William Shakespeare	Courtyard Theatre	Revival of 2005 production
2008	Hamlet	William Shakespeare	Courtyard Theatre	with David Tennant and Patrick Stewart, also transferred to the Novello Theatre and adapted into BBC 2009 film
2008	Love's Labour's Lost	William Shakespeare	Courtyard Theatre	
2011	Written on the Heart	David Edgar	Swan Theatre, Stratford-upon-Avon Duchess Theatre	to mark the 400th anniversary of the publication of the King James Bible.
2012	Julius Caesar	William Shakespeare	Royal Shakespeare Theatre	for the World Shakespeare Festival, which played in Stratford-upon-Avon, London, Moscow, New York and Ohio.
2012	The Orphan of Zhao	Ji Junxiang	Swan Theatre, Stratford-upon-Avon	
2013	Richard II	William Shakespeare	Royal Shakespeare Theatre Barbican Centre	with David Tennant
2014	Henry IV, Part 1 and Henry IV, Part 2	William Shakespeare	Royal Shakespeare Theatre Barbican Centre	
2014	The Witch of Edmonton	William Rowley, Thomas Dekker and John Ford	Swan Theatre, Stratford-upon-Avon	with Eileen Atkins
2015	Death of a Salesman	Arthur Miller	Royal Shakespeare Theatre Noël Coward Theatre	with Antony Sher in the role of Willy Loman, Alex Hassell as Biff and Harriet Walter as Linda Loman.
2015	Henry V	William Shakespeare	Royal Shakespeare Theatre	
2016	King Lear	William Shakespeare	Royal Shakespeare Theatre	with Antony Sher
2016	The Tempest	William Shakespeare	Royal Shakespeare Theatre	with Simon Russell Beale
2017	Venus & Adonis	William Shakespeare	Swan Theatre, Stratford-upon-Avon	Revival of 2004 and 2007 productions
2017	Imperium: The Cicero Plays	Mike Poulton, based on the Cicero trilogy by Robert Harris	Swan Theatre, Stratford-upon-Avon Gielgud Theatre	
2018	King Lear	William Shakespeare	Royal Shakespeare Theatre	with Antony Sher
2018	Troilus and Cressida	William Shakespeare	Royal Shakespeare Theatre	
2019	The Boy in the Dress	based on the novel by David Walliams, book by Mark Ravenhill, music and lyrics by Robbie Williams and Guy Chambers	Royal Shakespeare Theatre	
2019	Measure for Measure	William Shakespeare	Royal Shakespeare Theatre	
2022	Richard III	William Shakespeare	Royal Shakespeare Theatre	
2023	Cymbeline	William Shakespeare	Royal Shakespeare Theatre	

=== Non-RSC ===
Doran has directed productions outside the RSC including:

- The York Mystery Plays in the Millennium production in York Minster, 2000
- The Real Inspector Hound and Black Comedy, 1998, Comedy Theatre, London
- Mahler's Conversion by Ronald Harwood, Aldwych Theatre, London
- The Giant by Antony Sher, Hampstead Theatre, London
- Anjin: the English Samurai by Mike Poulton
- The Merchant of Venice, Galaxy Theatre, Tokyo
- The Two Gentlemen of Verona, Oxford Playhouse, Oxford, 2024
- The Government Inspector, Chichester Festival Theatre, 2025
