= Imperium (play cycle) =

Stage adaptations of Robert Harris' Cicero novels

Imperium: The Cicero Plays
- Original language: English
- Written by: Mike Poulton
- Characters: Cicero, Julius Caesar, Pompey the Great
- Setting: Rome, 70 BC – 43 BC

Premiere
- Date: 16 November 2017
- Place: Swan Theatre, Stratford-upon-Avon

Imperium: The Cicero Plays is a stage adaptation of the Cicero trilogy of novels by Robert Harris (Imperium, Lustrum and Dictator). It was premiered by the Royal Shakespeare Company at the Swan Theatre in Stratford-upon-Avon from 16 November 2017 to 10 February 2018, directed by Gregory Doran and with Richard McCabe as Cicero. It played at the Gielgud Theatre in London from 14 June to 8 September 2018.

== Plot summary ==
The cycle consists of six plays, each roughly one hour long, performed in two groups of three, all narrated by Cicero's slave and later freedman Tiro.

=== Part I - Conspirator ===
The first group consists of the plays Cicero, Catiline and Clodius. It includes a brief flashback to Cicero's prosecution of Verres in 70 BC but mainly runs from Cicero's election campaign for consul in 64 BC until his exile in 58 BC, adapting material from the end of Imperium, the whole of Lustrum and the start of Dictator.

=== Part II - Dictator ===
The second group adapts the remainder of Dictator into three plays entitled Caesar, Mark Anthony and Octavian. The first opens as Cicero returns to Italy in the wake of Caesar's victory at Pharsalus in 48 BC, followed by a summing-up of the recent Civil War and Caesar's assumption of dictatorial powers. The rest of the three plays then follow Cicero's reaction to the Ides of March and his failed attempts to save the Roman Republic by playing Mark Anthony and Octavian off against each other, culminating in Cicero's execution in 43 BC. The final play ends with an epilogue by Tiro, covering the later fates of Brutus, Cassius, Octavian, and Mark Anthony and imagining Cicero's afterlife in words from his own Dream of Scipio.

== Cast (premier production) ==
- Nicholas Boulton - Celer, Cicero's patrician ally (Part I) / Cassius, conspirator against Caesar (Part II)
- Guy Burgess - Verres (Part I) / Sura, Catiline's ally (Part I) / Lepidus, leader of Caesar's veterans (Part II)
- Daniel Burke - Sositheus, Cicero's slave (Part I) / Marcus, Cicero's son (Part II)
- Jade Croot - Tullia, Cicero's daughter
- Peter de Jersey - Julius Caesar
- Joe Dixon - Catiline (Part I) / Mark Antony (Part II)
- John Dougall - Rabirius, aged senator (Part I) / Metellus Pius, Chief Pontiff (Part I) / Lucullus, patrician (Part I) / Brutus, one of Caesar's murderers (Part II)
- Michael Grady-Hall - Cato (Part I) / Hirtius, consul in 43 BC (Part II)
- Paul Kemp - Quintus, Cicero's younger brother
- Joseph Kloska - Tiro, Cicero's slave and secretary
- Patrick Knowles - Cethegus, one of Catiline's allies (Part I) / Dolabella, Tullia's unfaithful husband (Parts I and II)
- Richard McCabe - Cicero
- Hywel Morgan - Hybrida, Cicero's fellow consul for 63 BC (Part I) / Popillius, Cicero's murderer (Part II)
- Lily Nichol - Camilla (Part I) / Calpurnia, Caesar's wife (Part II)
- David Nicolle - Crassus (Part I) / Pansa, consul in 43 BC (Part II)
- Pierro Niel-Mee - Clodius, Cicero's pupil and later enemy (Part I) / Agrippa, Octavian's second-in-command (Part II)
- Siobhan Redmond - Terentia, Cicero's wife (Parts I and II) / Servilia, Brutus's mother (Part II)
- Patrick Romer - Isauricus (Part I) / Piso, Caesar's father-in-law (Part II)
- Jay Saighal - Numitorius, witness against Verres (Part I) / Caeparius, one of Catiline's allies (Part I) / Decimus, conspirator against Caesar (Part II)
- Christopher Saul - Pompey (Part I) / Murena, consul in 62 BC (Part I) / Vatia, consul in 48 BC and ally of Octavian (Part II)
- Eloise Secker - Clodia, Clodius' sister (Part I) / Fulvia, Mark Antony's wife (Part II)
- Simon Thorp - Catulus (Part I) / Calenus, ally of Mark Antony (Part II)

== Cast (Gielgud production) ==
- Nicholas Armfield - Clodius (Part I) / Agrippa (Part II)
- Nicholas Boulton - Celer (Part I) / Cassius (Part II)
- Tom Brownlee - Lictor (Part I) / Gladiator 1 (Part II)
- Guy Burgess - Verres (Part I) / Sura (Part I) / Lepidus (Part II)
- Daniel Burke - Sositheus / Marcus (Part II)
- Jade Croot - Tullia
- Peter de Jersey - Julius Caesar
- Joe Dixon - Catiline (Part I) / Mark Antony (Part II)
- John Dougall - Rabirius (Part I) / Metellus Pius (Part I) / Lucullus (Part I) / Brutus (Part II)
- Michael Grady-Hall - Cato (Part I) / Hirtius (Part II)
- Oliver Johnstone - Rufus / Octavian (Part II)
- Paul Kemp - Quintus
- Joseph Kloska - Tiro
- Patrick Knowles - Cethegus (Part I) / Dolabella (Parts I and II)
- Andrew Langton - Numitorius (Part I) / Caeparius (Part I) / Decimus (Part II)
- Richard McCabe - Cicero
- Hywel Morgan - Hybrida (Part I) / Popillius (Part II)
- David Nicolle - Crassus (Part I) / Pansa (Part II)
- Siobhan Redmond - Terentia (Parts I and II) / Servilia (Part II)
- Patrick Romer - Isauricus (Part I) / Piso (Part II)
- Christopher Saul - Pompey (Part I) / Murena (Part I) / Vatia (Part II)
- Eloise Secker - Clodia (Part I) / Fulvia (Part II)
- Simon Thorp - Catulus (Part I) / Calenus (Part II)
- Scott Westwood - Young Officer (Part I) / Gladiator 2 (Part II)
- Alisha Williams - Camilla (Part I) / Young Mark Antony (Part I) / Calpurnia (Part II)
