= Gielgud Theatre =

West End theatre in London

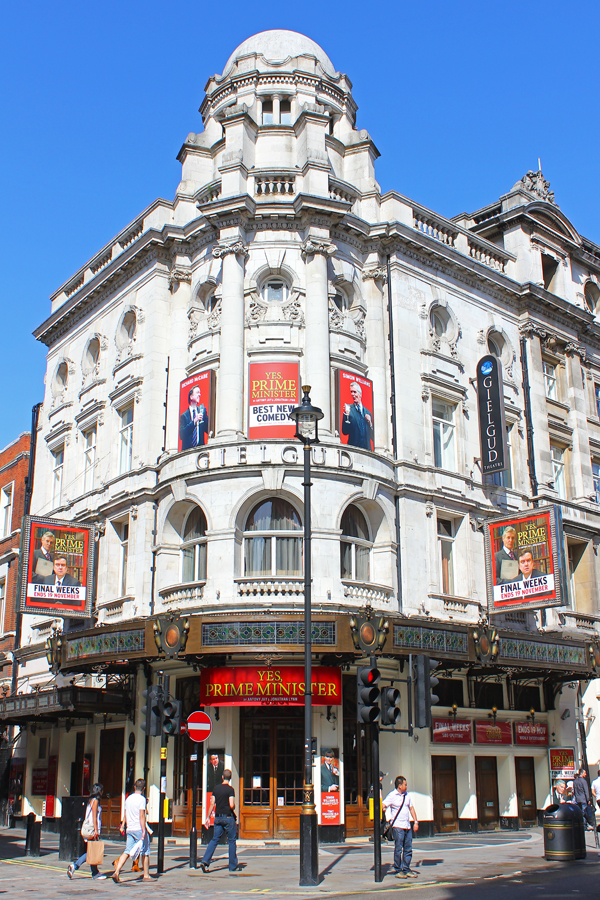
- Gielgud Theatre in 2011
- Interactive map of Gielgud Theatre
- Address: Shaftesbury Avenue; London, W1; United Kingdom
- Coordinates: 51°30′42″N 00°07′59″W
- Owner: Delfont Mackintosh Theatres
- Capacity: 994 on three levels
- Type: West End theatre
- Designation: Grade II
- Production: Oliver!
- Public transit: Leicester Square; Piccadilly Circus

Construction
- Opened: 27 December 1906; 119 years ago
- Architect: W. G. R. Sprague

Website
- www.gielgudtheatre.co.uk

The Gielgud Theatre is a West End theatre, located on Shaftesbury Avenue, at the corner of Rupert Street, in the City of Westminster, London. The house currently has 994 seats on three levels.

The theatre was designed by W. G. R. Sprague and opened on 27 December 1906 as the Hicks Theatre, named after Seymour Hicks, for whom it was built. The first play at the theatre was a hit musical called The Beauty of Bath co-written by Hicks. Another big success was A Waltz Dream in 1908. In 1909, the American impresario Charles Frohman became manager of the theatre and renamed the house the Globe Theatre, a name that it retained for 85 years. Call It a Day opened in 1935 and ran for 509 performances, a long run for the slow inter-war years. There's a Girl in My Soup, opening in 1966, ran for almost three years, a record for the theatre that was not surpassed until Daisy Pulls It Off opened in April 1983 to run for 1,180 performances.

Refurbished in 1987, the theatre has since presented several Alan Ayckbourn premieres, including Man of the Moment (1990), as well as a notable revival of An Ideal Husband in 1992. During reconstruction of Shakespeare's Globe theatre on the South Bank, in 1994 the theatre was renamed the Gielgud Theatre in honour of Sir John Gielgud. Another refurbishment was completed in 2008.

The Globe's theatre cat, Beerbohm, became famous enough to receive a front-page obituary in the theatrical publication The Stage in 1995.

== History ==
=== Early years ===
The theatre opened on 27 December 1906 as the Hicks Theatre in honour of actor, manager and playwright Seymour Hicks, for whom it was built. Designed by W.G.R. Sprague in Louis XVI style, the theatre originally had 970 seats, but over the years boxes and other seats have been removed. The theatre is a pair with the Queen's Theatre, which opened in 1907 on the adjacent street corner.

The first play at the theatre was a musical called The Beauty of Bath by Hicks and Cosmo Hamilton. My Darling, another Hicks musical, followed in 1907, followed by the original London production of Brewster's Millions, and the next year, the long-running London premiere production of the Straus operetta, A Waltz Dream . An astonishing event occurred midway through the run of the theatre's next major work, a musical titled The Dashing Little Duke (1909), which was produced by Hicks. Hicks' wife, Ellaline Terriss, played the title role (a woman playing a man). When she missed several performances due to illness, Hicks stepped into the role – possibly the only case in the history of musical theatre where a husband succeeded to his wife's role.

In 1909, the American impresario Charles Frohman became sole manager of the theatre and renamed the house Globe Theatre (the "Globe Theatre" on Newcastle Street had been demolished in 1902, making the name available). The reopening production was His Borrowed Plumes, written by Lady Randolph Churchill, Winston Churchill's mother. During the First World War, the musical Peg O' My Heart was a success at the theatre. Noël Coward debuted his Fallen Angels here in 1925. Call It a Day by Dodie Smith opened in 1935 and ran for 509 performances, an unusually long run for the slow inter-war years. Shakespeare and classic plays, as well as musicals, were seen at the theatre in the decades that followed. In 1939, actor John Gielgud directed and starred in a revival of The Importance of Being Earnest that was "regarded at the time as the definitive production of the 20th century."

=== After World War II ===
Gielgud took his production of The Lady's Not for Burning, by Christopher Fry, to the Globe Theatre in 1949 for a successful West End premiere. Likewise, in 1960, A Man For All Seasons had its stage premiere here. Terence Frisby's There's a Girl in My Soup, opening in 1966, ran for 1,064 performances at the theatre, a record that was not surpassed until Andrew Lloyd Webber's production of the Olivier Award-winning comedy Daisy Pulls It Off by Denise Deegan opened in April 1983 to run until February 1986 for 1,180 performances, the theatre's longest run. In 1987 Peter Shaffer's play Lettice and Lovage had a hit London premiere, starring Maggie Smith and Margaret Tyzack, and running for two years. One of several Coward revivals in recent decades, Design for Living, starring Rachel Weisz, transferred to the theatre in 1995. When Lloyd Webber rewrote Tell Me on a Sunday, he relaunched it at the theatre to good notices.

The Globe was the home of a resident theatre cat named Beerbohm, after actor Herbert Beerbohm Tree. The tabby's portrait still hangs in the corridor near the stalls. Beerbohm appeared on stage at least once in every production, forcing the actors to improvise. He always chose to occupy certain actors' dressing rooms while they were at the theatre, including Peter Bowles, Michael Gambon and Penelope Keith. Beerbohm was mentioned several times on Desert Island Discs, and he was the only cat to have received a front-page obituary in the theatrical publication, The Stage. He died in March 1995 at the age of 20.

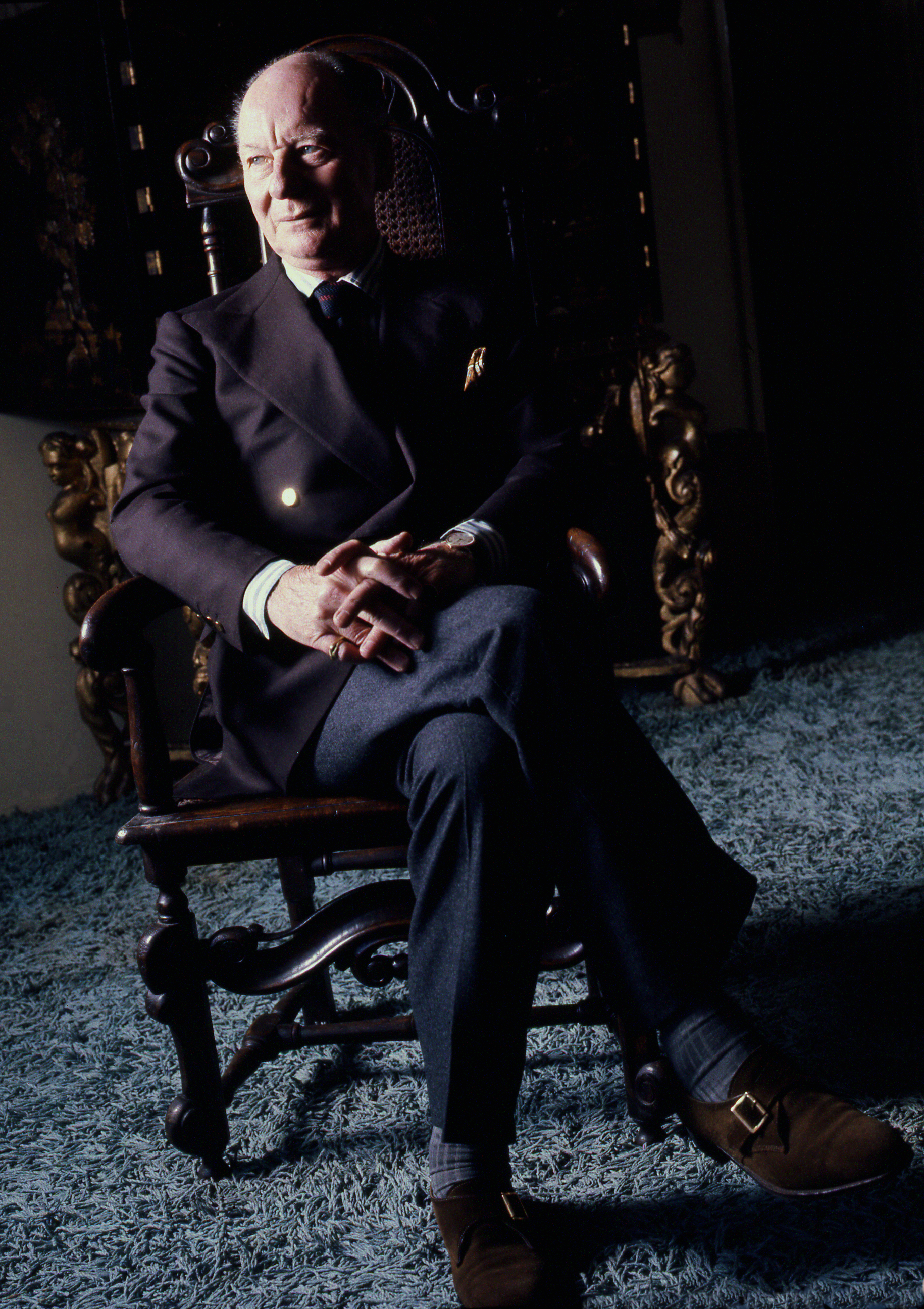
Gielgud in 1973. The theatre was named after him in 1994.

Refurbished in 1987, with extensive work on the gold leaf in the auditorium, the theatre is particularly notable for its beautiful circular Regency staircase, oval gallery and tower. The theatre has presented several Alan Ayckbourn premieres, including Man of the Moment (1990). Oscar Wilde's classic comedy, An Ideal Husband (1992) and One Flew Over the Cuckoo's Nest (2004) saw notable revivals, and the Royal Shakespeare Company and others have brought several Shakespeare and classic play revivals to the theatre in recent decades. The 2007 production of Equus attracted considerable press for the nude appearance of 17-year-old Daniel Radcliffe, who was still filming the Harry Potter films. The production was successful enough to transfer to Broadway and ran to 2009 there. Musicals returned in 2009 with a transfer of Avenue Q, and then a transfer from Broadway of Hair the next year, followed by the West End premiere of the stage version of Yes, Prime Minister before it went on tour.

In 1994, in anticipation of the 1997 opening of the reconstruction of Shakespeare's Globe Theatre on the South Bank, to avoid public confusion, the theatre was renamed the Gielgud Theatre in honour of John Gielgud. In 2003, Cameron Mackintosh announced plans to refurbish the Gielgud, including a joint entrance foyer with the adjacent Queen's Theatre, facing on to Shaftesbury Avenue. Mackintosh's Delfont Mackintosh Theatres took over operational control of the Gielgud from Andrew Lloyd Webber's Really Useful Theatres in 2006.

Work on the facade of the theatre started in March 2007 and the interior restoration, including reinstating the boxes at the back of the dress circle, was completed in January 2008. The theatre is one of the 40 theatres featured in the 2012 DVD documentary series Great West End Theatres, presented by Donald Sinden.

== Notable productions ==
Gertie Millar and Robert Evett in A Waltz Dream, 1908

- 1906: The Beauty of Bath, by Seymour Hicks and Cosmo Hamilton
- 1907: Brewster's Millions by Winchell Smith & Byron Ongley
- 1908: A Waltz Dream an operetta by Oscar Straus
- 1914: Kismet, a revival of Edward Knoblock's play, with Henry Daniell in his London debut.
- 1916: Peg O' My Heart by John Hartley Manners
- 1920: Fédora, a revival of the 1882 play by Victorien Sardou, with Basil Rathbone as Loris Ipanoff
- 1925: Fallen Angels by Noël Coward, starring Tallulah Bankhead
- 1929: Canaries Sometimes Sing by Frederick Lonsdale, starring Yvonne Arnaud
- 1931: The Improper Duchess by James B. Fagan, starring Yvonne Arnaud and Frank Cellier.
- 1935: Call it a Day by Dodie Smith
- 1939: The Importance of Being Earnest by Oscar Wilde, with John Gielgud starring as well as directing
- 1942: The Petrified Forest by Robert E. Sherwood
- 1949: The Lady's Not for Burning by Christopher Fry, with Richard Burton in a supporting role
- 1960: A Man For All Seasons by Robert Bolt, starring Paul Scofield
- 1966: There's a Girl in My Soup by Terence Frisby
- 1966: The Matchgirls by Bill Owen
- 1976: A season of Barry Humphries as Dame Edna Everage
- 1978: The Rear Column by Simon Gray, starring Jeremy Irons, Barry Foster, Simon Ward and Clive Francis
- 1982: Design for Living by Noël Coward, starring Vanessa Redgrave
- 1983: Daisy Pulls It Off by Denise Deegan
- 1987: Lettice and Lovage by Peter Shaffer, starring Maggie Smith and Margaret Tyzack
- 1990: Man of the Moment by Alan Ayckbourn premiere
- 1992: An Ideal Husband by Oscar Wilde
- 1995: Design for Living, starring Rachel Weisz

== Recent and present productions ==
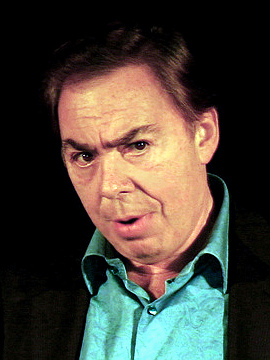
Andrew Lloyd Webber has mounted several notable productions at the theatre, and his company owned it for a time.

- 2003: Tell Me on a Sunday by Andrew Lloyd Webber, starring Denise Van Outen
- 2004: The RSC's All's Well That Ends Well, starring Judi Dench
- 2004: One Flew Over the Cuckoo's Nest, starring Christian Slater, Frances Barber and Mackenzie Crook
- 2005: Don Carlos by Friedrich Schiller, starring Derek Jacobi
- 2005: Some Girls by Neil LaBute, starring David Schwimmer and Catherine Tate
- 2005: And Then There Were None by Agatha Christie, starring Tara Fitzgerald
- 2006: The RSC's The Crucible and The Canterbury Tales
- 2006: Frost/Nixon by Peter Morgan, starring Michael Sheen and Frank Langella
- 2007: Equus by Peter Shaffer, starring Daniel Radcliffe and Richard Griffiths
- 2007: Macbeth by William Shakespeare, starring Patrick Stewart
- 2007: Nicholas Nickleby
- 2008: Carl Rosa Opera presented a Gilbert and Sullivan season
- 2008: God of Carnage by Yasmina Reza, starring Ralph Fiennes and Tamsin Greig
- 2008: Six Characters in Search of an Author by Luigi Pirandello, starring Ian McDiarmid
- 2008: Bill Bailey's Tinselworm
- 2009: Enjoy by Alan Bennett, starring Alison Steadman
- 2009: Avenue Q by Robert Lopez and Jeff Marx
- 2010: Hair
- 2010: Yes, Prime Minister by Antony Jay and Jonathan Lynn, starring David Haig and Henry Goodman
- 2011: The Umbrellas of Cherbourg
- 2011: Lend Me a Tenor
- 2011: The Ladykillers
- 2012: Chariots of Fire
- 2013: The Audience by Peter Morgan, starring Helen Mirren
- 2013: Private Lives by Noël Coward, starring Toby Stephens and Anna Chancellor
- 2013: Strangers on a Train by Craig Warner, starring Jack Huston, Laurence Fox and Imogen Stubbs
- 2014: Blithe Spirit by Noël Coward, starring Angela Lansbury
- 2014: The Curious Incident of the Dog in the Night-Time (re-opening after Apollo Theatre ceiling collapse)
- 2017: The Ferryman by Jez Butterworth
- 2018: Imperium, based on the Cicero novels by Robert Harris and adapted by Mike Poulton starring Richard McCabe and Joseph Kloska
- 2018: Company, starring Rosalie Craig, Mel Giedroyc, Patti LuPone, Ben Lewis and Jonathan Bailey
- 2019: Les Misérables – The Staged Concert, starring Michael Ball, Alfie Boe, Carrie Hope Fletcher and Matt Lucas
- 2019: Girl from the North Country
- 2020: The Upstart Crow, starring David Mitchell
- 2021: The Mirror and the Light
- 2022: To Kill a Mockingbird by Aaron Sorkin, adapted from the novel by Harper Lee
- 2023: The Crucible by Arthur Miller, starring Fisayo Akinade, Milly Alcock, and Brian Gleeson (transfer from the National Theatre)
- 2023: Stephen Sondheim's Old Friends, starring Bernadette Peters and Lea Salonga
- 2024: Frank Skinner's 30 Years Of Dirt
- 2024: Opening Night, starring Sheridan Smith
- 2024: Juno and the Paycock by Sean O'Casey, starring Mark Rylance and J. Smith-Cameron
- 2024: Oliver!, starring Simon Lipkin, Aaron Sidwell, and Shanay Holmes (transfer from the Chichester Festival Theatre)
