= Asclapo =

Ancient Greek physician

Asclapo was a Greek physician of ancient Rome who lived in Patrae, in Achaia, and who attended on Cicero's freedman, Marcus Tullius Tiro, during an illness of his in 51 BCE. Cicero was so much pleased by his kindness and his medical skill that he wrote a letter of recommendation for him to Servius Sulpicius Rufus in 47 BCE. Though some later writers thought that Cicero's commendation of Asclapo was "distinctly cool" compared to similar commendations he wrote for other doctors, indicating his praise of Asclapo wasn't as sincere.
