= Imperium (Harris novel) =

Fictionalised biography of Marcus Tullius Cicero

- First edition cover
- Author: Robert Harris
- Language: English
- Series: Cicero trilogy
- Genre: Historical novel
- Publisher: Hutchinson
- Publication date: 4 September 2006
- Publication place: United Kingdom
- Media type: Print (hardback)
- Pages: 416 (first edition, hardback)
- ISBN: 0-09-180095-1 (first edition, hardback)
- OCLC: 67374396
- Followed by: Lustrum

Imperium is a 2006 novel by English author Robert Harris. It is a fictional biography of Cicero, told through the first-person narrator of his secretary Tiro, beginning with the prosecution of Gaius Verres.

The book is the first in a trilogy. The second volume, Lustrum (Conspirata for U.S. audiences), was published in October 2009. The third volume, Dictator, was published in 2015. Publication of the sequels was delayed whilst Harris worked on other books, including his contemporary political novel, The Ghost, inspired by the resignation of Tony Blair.

The book was serialized as the Book at Bedtime on BBC Radio 4 from 4 to 15 September 2006, read by Douglas Hodge. An abridged audiobook on compact disc, read by British actor Oliver Ford Davies, is available. Unabridged audiobooks on compact discs are also available, read by Simon Jones and Bill Wallis.

A theatrical adaptation of the trilogy by Mike Poulton was performed by the Royal Shakespeare Company in the Swan Theatre, Stratford-upon-Avon in 2017, and transferred to the Gielgud Theatre in London in 2018. The two plays were directed by RSC Artistic Director Gregory Doran, with Richard McCabe as Cicero.

== Plot summary ==
Part One – Senator – 79–70 BC

The book opens with Tiro, the secretary of Marcus Tullius Cicero and the book's narrator, looking back in time over the thirty-six years he was with his master. After a brief background covering Cicero's vocal training under Apollonius Molon, the narrative shifts back to Rome with Cicero being visited by an old acquaintance, Sthenius of Thermae. Sthenius reveals that he has fled his home in Sicily to escape its governor, Gaius Verres, who runs the island like a protection racket. After some hesitation, Cicero takes the case, despite opposition from Verres’ powerful allies among the senatorial aristocracy, who do their best to undermine him from the start.

After several false starts - including pledging to aid Pompey the Great, only to be snubbed - Cicero gathers enough evidence to prosecute Verres in the extortion court. However, Quintus Hortensius Hortalus - Verres' defence lawyer and Cicero's rival - uses procedural tricks to try and delay the trial until the new year. Once that happens, Hortensius, along with Verres' ally Quintus Metellus, will be consul, and Metellus' brother Marcus will be head of the extortion court, leaving the trial's outcome all but guaranteed. Cicero's wife, Terentia, advises him to make his opening speech shorter, and Cicero, taking this to its logical extreme, declares he will make no speech at all. Instead, he begins calling his witnesses straight away, leaving Verres and his allies blindsided as they sit through one damaging testimony after another. Verres' fate is sealed when he drunkenly implicates himself in the death of Publius Gavius, who Verres had crucified despite Gavius repeatedly proclaiming, "I am a Roman citizen!" Despite this triumph, it is revealed that Cicero had made a deal with Pompey to ensure he could proceed as he wished. In return, Pompey "advises" him to take whatever offer Hortensius makes, setting the tone for their relationship going forward.

Part Two – Praetorian 68–64 BC

Two years later, Cicero receives word that Rome has been attacked by pirates, along with a summons to an emergency war council at Pompey's estate. Pompey, supported by Julius Caesar, outlines a plan to divide the Mediterranean into fifteen zones, each with its own legate, responsible for clearing his area of pirates and ensuring they don't return. In a complete departure from the norm, all fifteen legates are to report directly to one supreme commander - Pompey the Great. Through Cicero's clever politicking, Pompey receives the command unopposed, and, once the pirates are dealt with, is given command of the ongoing war against Mithridates VI of Pontus, displacing the aristocratic Lucius Licinius Lucullus and earning the ire of the patricians. Cicero, as Pompey's proxy, ends up on the receiving end of their anger.

Around this time, Cicero learns of the growing drama surrounding Lucius Sergius Catilina, a former governor of Africa awaiting prosecution for abusing his position. Eventually, events take a dramatic turn when the young patrician Publius Clodius Pulcher lays charges against Catilina for his crimes. Cicero, in need of a running mate for consul, offers to defend Catilina, which the latter accepts, while making it clear that he has already bought the jury, and that Clodius is in on it. However, the birth of Cicero's son that night makes him reconsider, and he rescinds his offer, earning him Catilina's undying hatred. Further developments convince Cicero that Crassus is trying to hijack the election through Catilina, his running mate Antonius Hybrida, and numerous others. Needing proof, he works with an inside man to have Tiro hidden in a secret alcove in Crassus' house and use his shorthand system to record everything said. Tiro's notes confirm that Crassus is heading a conspiracy to seize the state and enrich themselves under the guise of populism, as well as confirming numerous co-conspirators such as Catilina, Hybrida, and Caesar. The following day, Tiro takes a copy of the notes to Hortensius, while Cicero, in his opening bid for the consulship, launches a verbal attack on Catilina in the Senate. Afterward, Cicero and Tiro are taken to a secret meeting with Hortensius, Lucullus, and other leading patricians. After being given a firsthand demonstration of Tiro's method, they agree to support Cicero in return for future favors.

At the consular election the following day, the aristocrats keep their word. Cicero wins first place, while Hybrida, coming in second, becomes his designated colleague. Catilina loses badly, leaving him close to bankruptcy, and Crassus and Caesar find their schemes thwarted, at least for now. Cicero celebrates his elevation to the highest office in the Roman state, and, with Pompey absent and the conspirators defeated, is optimistic about what the future holds.

== Reception ==
Tom Holland reports for The Guardian:

Harris, like an excavator restoring a shattered mosaic, uses material native to the Romans whenever he can, fitting the fragments of real speeches and letters into the patterns of his own reconstruction. The result is an experiment as bold as it is unexpected: a novel that draws so scrupulously on the Roman source material that it forgoes much of what are traditionally regarded as the prime features of the thriller. (Holland, 2006)

Furthermore Publishers Weekly commented that the "action is relentless, and readers will be disappointed when Harris leaves Cicero at the moment of his greatest triumph."

== Sources ==
- Imperium, Robert Harris, Arrow Books, copyright 2006, Epub ISBN 9781409021629

== Release details ==
- 2006, UK, Hutchinson (ISBN 0-09-180095-1), Pub date 4 September 2006, hardback (First edition)
- 2006, US, Simon & Schuster (ISBN 0-7432-6603-X), Pub date 26 September 2006, hardback
