= Daisy Pulls It Off =

Play written by Denise Deegan

- Original language: English
- Written by: Denise Deegan
- Subject: captures the uncomplicated innocence of Angela Brazil's schoolgirl novels, set in 1927 super-achiever finally gains acceptance at school
- Genre: Comedy parody
- Setting: English boarding school for girls

Premiere
- Date: December 1983
- Place: Nuffield Theatre; Southampton

Daisy Pulls It Off is a comedy play by Denise Deegan. It is an original script. It is a parody of wholesome adventure stories about life in a 1920s girls' English boarding school, in a similar genre to those by Angela Brazil. The original production of the play tested at the Nuffield Theatre in Southampton in 1983, then ran for 1,180 performances in London at the Gielgud Theatre (then known as the Globe).

== Synopsis ==
Energetic Daisy Meredith, a girl from a poor background, is forced to face and overcome snobbish prejudice and schoolgirl pranks from the wealthier girls. She and her best friend, zany Trixie Martin, search for the missing treasure that could save the fortunes of the exclusive Grangewood School for Young Ladies. Along the way, Daisy overcomes false accusations, saves the lives of her enemies and discovers that the mysterious stranger seen around the grounds is her long-lost father.

At the start Trixie has a higher status, but as they start the hunt for the treasure Daisy's status becomes higher than Trixie's as she knows more about treasure seeking.

== Productions ==
After tryouts at the Nuffield Theatre in Southampton in 1983, the play was staged in the West End at the Gielgud Theatre (then known as the Globe) from April 1983 to February 1986, produced by Andrew Lloyd Webber and directed by David Gilmore. It ran for 1,180 performances and then toured for two years. Alexandra Mathie starred as Daisy. The play launched the careers of Kate Buffery, Lia Williams, Gabrielle Glaister and Samantha Bond. The programme credited the composition of the school song featured at the end of the play to "Beryl Waddle-Browne," an anagrammatical reference to producer Lloyd Webber.

The production won an Olivier Award and the Critics' Circle Theatre Award for Best Comedy. Kate Buffery was nominated for an Olivier as Best Supporting Actress.

Dewsbury Arts Group's 1989 production of the play was actress Victoria O'Keefe's last stage role, as Sybyl Burlington, before her untimely death at 21 in a car accident in 1990.

A 2002 revival at the Lyric Theatre was also directed by Gilmore and produced by Lloyd Webber. There was also a 2008 UK tour.

The family-friendly piece is a popular choice for school productions.

A revived London production ran at the Arts Theatre in the West End from 19 January - 6 February 2010. It was directed by Nadine Hanwell.

In 2018, the stage production revived starring a younger lead actress, Emily Elizabeth. The show lasted from May 2018 to November 2018, when it closed for the final time as a professional performance. The last show was performed in Liverpool at the Liverpool Empire Theatre on November 19, 2018.
