= Beerbohm (cat) =

Cat that lived at the Gielgud Theatre

- Species: Felis catus
- Sex: Male
- Born: 1974 or 1975; Globe Theatre, London
- Died: 21 March 1995 (aged 20)
- Owner: Gielgud Theatre

Beerbohm (1974 or 1975 – 21 March 1995) was a cat that resided at the Gielgud Theatre in London. He was born in the theatre, which was then named the Globe, and was named after actor and theatre manager Herbert Beerbohm Tree. He became renowned for attacking props and wandering into the actors' dressing rooms. Beerbohm came to public attention when he wandered across the stage during a 1978 performance by Hinge and Bracket, a behaviour he repeated throughout his life. Beerbohm retired in 1991 and went to live with the theatre's master carpenter in Beckenham. News of his death in March 1995 was carried in many national newspapers and he became the first and, thus far, only cat to receive a front-page obituary in The Stage.

== Biography ==
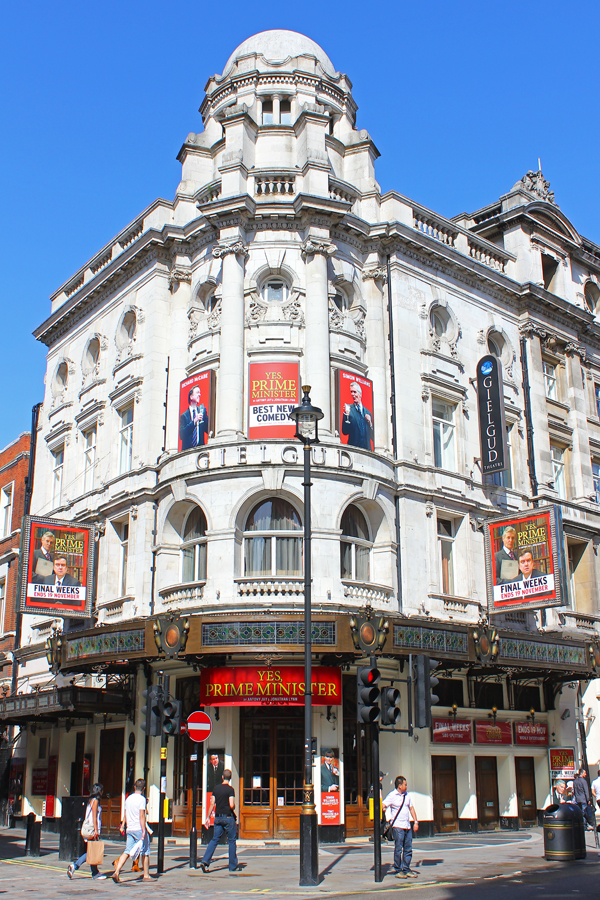
The Gielgud Theatre in 2011

Beerbohm was 20 years old when he died, meaning that he was born in 1974 or 1975. According to one writer, he was born in the Globe Theatre (later renamed the Gielgud Theatre after actor and director John Gielgud) in London's West End in the 1970s; however, his obituary in The Stage states that he "arrived at the Globe during the run of Donkey's Years in 1976". Theatres historically maintained cats on the premises as a means of controlling vermin, but their role increased over time as actors came to see them as good-luck charms and a means of reducing stress. Beerbohm, a tabby cat, was named after Herbert Beerbohm Tree, an actor and theatre manager.

The cat soon gained a reputation for wandering into dressing rooms and attacking feathered hats and stuffed birds used as props. He came to public attention when he began wandering across the stage in the middle of productions. Beerbohm's first appearance was during a performance of the Hinge and Bracket Review in 1978. He is also said to have enjoyed entering the dressing rooms of Michael Gambon and Peter Bowles. He became known as one of the most famous of all theatre cats and counted Paul Eddington and Penelope Keith amongst his biggest fans. As a result of his popularity amongst actors, he was mentioned several times on the BBC Radio programme Desert Island Discs.

Beerbohm is said to have survived being run over by a car on the streets of Soho. He was said to have had a girlfriend at the Lyric Theatre whom he would rush off to see frequently. Beerbohm's career is said to be the longest of any modern-day theatre cat and lasted until his retirement in 1991, when he went to live with Tony Ramsey, the theatre's master carpenter, in Beckenham.

Beerbohm died on 21 March 1995, aged 20, and became the only cat ever to receive a front-page obituary in The Stage. In addition to Hinge and Bracket, Eddington, and Keith, actress Beryl Reid also contributed anecdotes to his obituary. His death was covered by most national newspapers of the time, including The Daily Telegraph. His portrait hangs in the foyer of the Gielgud Theatre and he has been the subject of a painting by Frances Broomfield.

== See also ==
- List of individual cats
