= Lustrum (novel) =

2009 novel by Robert Harris

- First edition cover
- Author: Robert Harris.
- Language: English
- Series: Cicero trilogy
- Genre: Historical novel
- Publisher: Hutchinson
- Publication date: 8 October 2009
- Publication place: United Kingdom
- Media type: Print (hardback)
- Pages: 464 pp (first edition hardback)
- ISBN: 0-09-180100-1 (first edition hardback)
- OCLC: 441126456
- Preceded by: Imperium
- Followed by: Dictator

Lustrum (US: Conspirata; 2009) is a historical novel by British author Robert Harris. It is the sequel to Imperium and the middle volume of a trilogy about the life of Cicero (106–43 BC). For its 2010 release in the United States and Italy, it was retitled Conspirata.

The book continues in the format of the first novel, with the story told in the first-person from the point of view of Cicero's secretary Tiro. It follows on immediately from Imperium, starting with the beginning of Cicero's consulship and ending with his exile as a result of the enmity of Clodius.

The novel was shortlisted for the 2010 Walter Scott Prize. It and the other novels in the trilogy were also adapted for the stage in 2017 by Mike Poulton.
