= Dictator (Harris novel) =

2015 novel by Robert Harris

- First edition cover
- Author: Robert Harris
- Audio read by: David Rintoul
- Language: English
- Series: Cicero trilogy
- Genre: Historical novel
- Publisher: Hutchinson
- Publication date: 8 October 2015
- Publication place: United Kingdom
- Media type: Print (Hardback)
- Pages: 384 pp (first edition, hardback)
- ISBN: 978-0-09-175210-1 (first edition, hardback)
- OCLC: 922021399
- Preceded by: Lustrum

Dictator is a historical novel by British author Robert Harris, published in 2015, which concludes his trilogy about the life of the Roman lawyer, politician and orator, Cicero (106–43 BC). Dictator follows the first novel Imperium (2006) and the second novel Lustrum (2009). It is both a biography of Cicero and a tapestry of Rome in the time of Pompey, Crassus, Cato, Caesar, Clodius and ultimately Octavian.

In Harris's summary: "Thus Imperium describes the rise to power, Lustrum the years in power and Dictator the repercussions of power." All three novels were adapted for the stage in 2017 by Mike Poulton.

== Plot summary ==
The story is told through Tiro, secretary of Cicero, detailing Cicero's last fifteen years. It begins with Cicero fleeing Publius Clodius Pulcher and his mob in Rome and going into exile in Thessalonica. He is able to return to Rome after more than a year under the promise to support Julius Caesar. Back in Rome, he attempts to revive the Roman Republic, but the forces against this are too strong. Rule by a triumvirate—Julius Caesar, Pompey, and Crassus—eventually becomes rule by one man when Caesar takes control through civil war. Caesar becomes too powerful and is murdered by a group led by Gaius Cassius Longinus, Decimus Junius Brutus, and Marcus Junius Brutus. The Senate fails to take control and Mark Antony rises. Cicero sets his hopes on the young Octavian, but when Octavian strikes a deal with Antony and Marcus Aemilius Lepidus, Cicero is doomed and the days of the Republic are over. Tiro also relates family and personal matters, such as death and divorce, during Cicero's final years.

== Editions ==
- 2015, UK, Hutchinson (ISBN 978-0-09-175210-1), Pub date 8 October 2015, hardback (first edition)
- 2016, USA, Knopf (ISBN 978-0-307-95794-8), Pub date 12 January 2016, hardback (first US edition)
