= Denise Deegan =

English novelist and playwright

- Born: 1952 (age 73–74); London, England
- Education: East 15 Acting School
- Occupations: Playwright, director
- Writing career
- Notable work: Daisy Pulls It Off

Denise Deegan (born 1952) is an English novelist and playwright. She is best known for her play, Daisy Pulls It Off.

== Biography ==
Deegan was born in London, England, and she trained in stage management at East 15 Acting School. Prior to writing Daisy Pulls It Off (1983), she worked as a freelance stage manager. Deegan is the resident writer for the prison, HMP Featherstone, where she teaches writing to inmates.

== Work ==
Deegan is best known for Daisy Pulls It Off (1983), a comedy that which spoofs "schoolgirl novels" of the type written by Angela Brazil. The play was called a "pitch-perfect spoof" by The Guardian and it ran for three years in the West End theatre. Her play, The Hiring Fair, is based on a true story of events that took place at the Portfield Fair.

Playwright and critic, Michelene Wandor, identifies Deegan's plays as feminist in nature.

== Bibliography ==
- The Project (1971).
- The One and Only Wonderous Legends Show (for EMMA Theatre Company).
- Daisy Pulls It Off (1983).
- A Late Late Christmas Carol.
- The Midsummer Gathering
- No Birds Sing
- The Harvester's Feast
- The Hiring Fair
- Turn the Old Year Go
- Tom Jones (adaptation)
- Swallows & Amazons (co-adaptation)
- Transports of Delight
- Every Night Something Awful
- Ideal Words
