= Richard McCabe =

Scottish actor (born 1960)

Richard McCabe (born William McCabe; 18 August 1960) is a Scottish actor who has specialised in classical theatre. He is an Associate Artist of the Royal Shakespeare Company (RSC).

== Career ==
McCabe is an Associate Artist of the Royal Shakespeare Company (RSC), his roles include the 1989 production of A Midsummer Night's Dream, The Winter's Tale, Christopher Marlowe in Peter Whelan's School of Night (1993–94). Other major roles with the RSC have been the title role in King John (2006; Josie O’Rourke, Swan); Iago opposite Ray Fearon in Othello (1999–2000; Michael Attenborough, RST & Barbican); Flamineo in John Webster’s White Devil (1996–97).

McCabe has also been associated with Chichester's Festival Theatre, playing a range of contrasting roles including the title role in Scapino or The Trickster by Molière (Festival Theatre 2005), directed by Silviu Purcarete. In 2010, McCabe played the critic Moon in The Real Inspector Hound by Tom Stoppard, and Mr. Puff in The Critic by Richard Brinsley Sheridan in a double bill at the Minerva theatre, as well as Jonson in Bingo by Edward Bond that subsequently transferred to the Young Vic.

In 2011 McCabe played Jim Hacker in a nationwide tour of Yes, Prime Minister which then transferred to both the Apollo and Gielgud theatres. He played Tropachov in Fortune's Fool by Turgenev at the Old Vic theatre.

In September and October 2012, he played an older Romeo opposite Kathryn Hunter's Juliet in Ben Power's adaptation of Romeo and Juliet, called A Tender Thing (2009), directed by Helena Kaut-Hausen. He also played Hamlet over a period of three years (1999–2001) for Birmingham Rep's production directed by Bill Alexander. This included appearing at the Hamlet Festival at Elsinore Castle in Denmark in 2001.

At the 2013 Olivier Awards, McCabe won the Laurence Olivier Award for Best Actor in a Supporting Role for his role as PM Harold Wilson in the original production of Peter Morgan's The Audience at the Gielgud Theatre. He had previously been nominated for the same Olivier Award in 1994 for his role as Autolycus in the 1992 RSC production of The Winter's Tale.

On 7 June 2015, at the 69th Tony Awards, McCabe won the Tony Award for Best Featured Actor for the Broadway production of The Audience, starring Dame Helen Mirren as Queen Elizabeth II. Mirren won the Best Actress Tony Award. He also won awards for Outstanding Featured Actor (Outer Critics Circle Awards) and Distinguished Performance (Drama League Award). In 2017, McCabe acted in the role of Major General David Harding in the Bollywood film, Rangoon.

McCabe also played Cicero in the Imperium cycle of plays at the Royal Shakespeare Company in 2017/8.

The 2022 English National Opera production of The Yeomen of the Guard at the Coliseum Theatre, London, featured McCabe as Jack Point.

== Other ==
Described by Michael Billington of The Guardian as "One of our finest actors" and Charles Spencer of The Daily Telegraph as "One of the best actors of his generation", McCabe has received Olivier and Tony Awards.

On television McCabe played Frank Gresham Senior, owner of Greshamsbury Park, in Julian Fellowes' adaptation for ITV of Anthony Trollope's novel Doctor Thorne. He has also appeared in Poldark, Peaky Blinders, all four series of Wallander, Indian Summers, and The Best of Men. On film McCabe has appeared in Eye in the Sky, Mindhorn, The Constant Gardener, Master and Commander, Notting Hill, and Persuasion. Other films include Cinderella, The Invisible Woman, The Duchess, Vanity Fair, and Nightwatching.

== Filmography ==
=== Films ===
Year	Title	Role	Notes/Ref.
1995	Persuasion	Captain Benwick	
1999	Notting Hill	Tony	
2003	Master and Commander: The Far Side of the World	Mr. Higgins, Surgeon's Mate	
2004	The Tulse Luper Suitcases, Part 2: Vaux to the Sea	Horace	
2004	Vanity Fair	The King	
2005	The Constant Gardener	Arthur Hammond	
2007	Nightwatching	Bloemfeldt	
2008	The Duchess	Sir James Hare	
2012	Epithet	Alan	Short
2013	National Theatre Live: The Audience	Harold Wilson	Recorded theatre performance
2013	The Invisible Woman	Mr. Mark Lemon	
2015	Cinderella	Baron	
2015	Eye in the Sky	George Matherson	
2016	Mindhorn	Jeffrey Moncrieff	
2017	Rangoon	Major General Harding	
2017	Goodbye Christopher Robin	Rupert	
2018	The Little Stranger	Dr. Steely	
2019	From Preacher to Prophet A Sam Kinison Story	Limo driver	Short
2019	1917	Colonel Collins	
2020	The Duke	Rab Butler	
2021	SAS: Red Notice	Callum	
2021	Cyrano	Priest	
2026	Savage House	Mr. Bennett	

=== Television ===
Year	Title	Role	Notes/ref.
1985, 1990, 1995	The Bill	Steve Naylor/Darryl/Colin	3 episodes
1987	Bulman	Eddie	1 episode
1991	For the Greater Good	Trusty	1 episode
1994	Between the Lines	Philip Skinner	1 episode
1997	Bramwell	Osborne	1 episode
1997	A Prince Among Men	Tubby McFinnon	1 episode
1998	Heat of the Sun	Theodore Watcham	1 episode
1998	Killer Net	D.I. Colby	Serial - 3 episodes
1999	The Vice	Michael Walden	2 episodes
2000	Trial & Retribution	Roger Barker	2 episodes
2003	Waking the Dead	Karl Meerman	
2003	Family	Jeremy Davison	Serial
2003	Foyle's War	Colin Fowler	
2004	The Inspector Lynley Mysteries	Theatre Manager	
2005	To the Ends of the Earth	Mr. Brocklebank	Serial
2006	Midsomer Murders	Rev. Anthony Gant	
2006	Jane Eyre	Mr. Brocklehurst	
2007	The Whistleblowers	Charles Radford	
2007	Heroes and Villains	Barras	TV series documentary
2008	Lewis	Gavin Matthews	
2008	Einstein and Eddington	Frank Dyson	TV movie
2008–15	Wallander	Nyberg	
2009	Spooks	Matthew Plowden	
2010	Masterpiece Mystery	Nyberg	
2012	Playhouse Presents	Tim Szabo	
2012	The Best of Men	Dr Cowan	TV movie
2013	Legacy	Gerry	TV movie
2013	Borgia	King Federigo d'Aragona	
2014	Peaky Blinders	Winston Churchill	
2014	The Great Fire	Lord Hyde	Serial
2014	The Game	Prime Minister	Serial
2015	Indian Summers	Stafford Armitage	
2016	Doctor Thorne	Frank Gresham Snr	Serial
2016–17	Poldark	Mr. Trencrom	
2017	Harlots	Justice Cunliffe	
2017	Electric Dreams	Dr. Thaddeus Cutter	
2017	Doc Martin	Trevor Dodds	
2018	Collateral	Peter Westbourne	Serial
2020	The English Game	Colonel Jackson	
2021	Death in Paradise	Professor Roger Harkness	
2021	A Very British Scandal	George Whigham	
2022	The Pentaverate	Exalted Pikeman Higgins	

== Awards and honours ==
Year	Ceremony	Award	Nominated work	Result	Ref.
1994	Laurence Olivier Awards	Best Supporting Actor	The Winter's Tale	Nominated	
2013	Laurence Olivier Awards	Best Supporting Actor	The Audience	Won	
2015	Tony Awards	Best Featured Actor in a Play	The Audience	Won	
2015	Outer Critics Circle Awards	Outstanding Featured Actor	The Audience	Won	
2015	Drama League Award	Distinguished Performance Award	The Audience	Nominated	

== See also ==
- List of actors in Royal Shakespeare Company productions
