= Mike Poulton =

English writer

Mike Poulton is an English writer, translator and adapter of classic plays for contemporary audiences. He received a Tony nomination for his play 'Fortune's Fool' along with his adaptations of 'Wolf Hall' and 'Bring Up the Bodies'.

Poulton began his career in 1995 with Anton Chekhov's Uncle Vanya and Ivan Turgenev's Fortune's Fool, which were staged at the Chichester Festival Theatre, the former with Derek Jacobi, the latter with Alan Bates. Bates reprised his role for a 2002 Broadway production that earned Poulton a Tony Award nomination for Best Play.

Poulton's subsequent works include Chekov's Three Sisters, The Cherry Orchard, and The Seagull, Euripides' Ion, Henrik Ibsen's Hedda Gabler and Ghosts, August Strindberg's The Father and Dance of Death.

His adaptation of Friedrich von Schiller's Don Carlos was performed at the Chichester and in the West End with Derek Jacobi. Charlotte Loveridge has written, "Mike Poulton's new translation has superb lucidity and pace. Purging Schiller of any hint of verbosity or bombast, the text is full of deft shifts of register from the boldly poetic to the colloquial. As Posa asks the king, "You wish to plant a garden that will flower forever. Why do you water it with blood?" Unafraid to employ vocabulary with contemporary significance, the translation nevertheless does not dogmatically confine the meaning of the play to an exclusively modern interpretation".

Mary Stuart was performed at Clwyd Theatr Cymru and Wallenstein at Chichester. Other adaptations include Chaucer's Canterbury Tales for the Royal Shakespeare Company which was presented at the Gielgud Theatre from July to September 2006, and two plays based on Thomas Malory's Le Morte d'Arthur.

Poulton's adaptations have been presented by the Royal Shakespeare Company, the Theatre Royal, Plymouth, the Mercury Theatre, Colchester, the Crucible Theatre in Sheffield, the Birmingham Repertory Theatre, on Broadway, in the West End, and even in York Minster.

Poulton translated Fredrick von Schiller's Kabale und Liebe for a new production called Luise Miller, at the Donmar Warehouse in London, running from 8 June to 30 July 2011, starring Felicity Jones.

Poulton premiered a new adaptation of Ibsen's When We Dead Awaken at London's The Print Room in 2011. Re-titled Judgement Day, the production was directed by James Dacre and starred Michael Pennington and Penny Downie.

His adaptation of Turgenev's Fortune's Fool was revived in the West End at The Old Vic in December 2013. The production was directed by Lucy Bailey and starred Iain Glen (later replaced by Patrick Cremin and Will Houston) and Richard McCabe.

His adaptation of Charles Dickens' A Tale of Two Cities premiered at the Royal & Derngate in Northampton in February 2014. It features original music by Rachel Portman and is directed by James Dacre in his first in-house production since becoming those theatres' artistic director in July 2013.

Poulton's adaptations of Hilary Mantel's historical novels Wolf Hall and Bring Up The Bodies for the Royal Shakespeare Company premièred at the Swan Theatre in Stratford-upon-Avon in January 2014, at the Aldwych Theatre in London in May 2014 and at Broadway's Winter Garden Theatre in March 2015. His Kenny Morgan, a biographical play about Terence Rattigan, premiered at the Arcola Theatre from 18 May to 18 June 2016, whilst his adaptation of the York Mystery Plays premiered at York Minster in May and June the same year.

Poulton's most recent adaptation is Imperium, drawn from Robert Harris' Cicero trilogy – it was played by the Royal Shakespeare Company from November 2017 to February 2018.
