= Marcus Tullius Tiro =

Secretary and personal assistant to Marcus Tullius Cicero

Marcus Tullius Tiro (73–4 BC) was first a slave, then a freedman, of Cicero from whom he received his nomen and praenomen. He is frequently mentioned in Cicero's letters. After Cicero's death Tiro published his former master's collected works of letters and speeches. He also wrote a considerable number of books himself, and is thought to have invented an early form of shorthand.

== Life ==
The year of Tiro's birth is uncertain. Groebe, in the Realencyclopädie, places it at 103 BC per a statement in Jerome that Tiro died in his hundredth year; this dating, however, is unlikely given that Cicero's letters imply that he was much younger. Moreover, because valuable slaves usually received their freedom within a few years, Kathryn Tempest in the Encyclopedia of Ancient History, along with William McDermott in Historia, place his birth c. 80 BC.

There is no clear evidence of Tiro's parents or of his status as verna (slave born into a master's household). That said, he was probably verna and various scholars have speculated as to his birth parents. Groebe suggested he could have been born into Cicero's grandfather's household by a prisoner; others have suggested he could have been Cicero's son by a slave mistress, but this "should not be taken too seriously". Literary evidence of Tiro's activities grows, due to Cicero's letters, for Tiro's later life. Cicero frequently refers to Tiro in his letters (more than sixty such letters, with the whole 16th book of Cicero's letters to friends included). His duties included taking dictation, deciphering Cicero's handwriting and managing his table, as well as his garden and financial affairs.

Tiro's first appearance in the Ciceronean corpus is when Cicero seconded him to his brother Quintus Tullius Cicero to write political reports in 54 BC. Some date his manumission to this year, but it is more likely that he was manumitted the next year in April 53 BC. He was probably aged twenty. When Tiro was freed, with much celebration, he adopted Cicero's praenomen (Marcus) and nomen (Tullius); A letter from Cicero to Quintus describing the ceremony is lost, but letters from Quintus commending Cicero for his decision survive. It is possible that Pompey was present in an official capacity.

Afterwards, he accompanied Cicero to Cilicia during Cicero's governorship there (51–50 BC). On his return from Cilicia in 50 BC, Tiro fell seriously ill; Cicero's letters show the strength of their friendship and how Cicero regularly wrote to check on Tiro's health. Many of Cicero's letters refer with concern to his illnesses.

Tiro not only assisted Cicero in secretarial work, but also helped to proofread manuscripts, supervise copyists, and also help in private and financial matters. In 47 BC, for example, Tiro managed the leasing out of Cicero's gardens in Tusculum, oversaw the provision of water to the villa, catalogued the books at Cicero's estate, and tried to reconcile Cicero's daughter Tullia with her husband. He also was the point of contact for Cicero's financial matters: when Cicero divorced Terentia, his friend Titus Pomponius Atticus wrote to Tiro about repayment of Terentia's dowry.

He also pursued private ventures: letters to that effect describe such ventures in 44 BC, when he also bought a small farm probably near Puteoli, where Jerome says he died in 4 BC in "his hundredth year".

== Writings ==
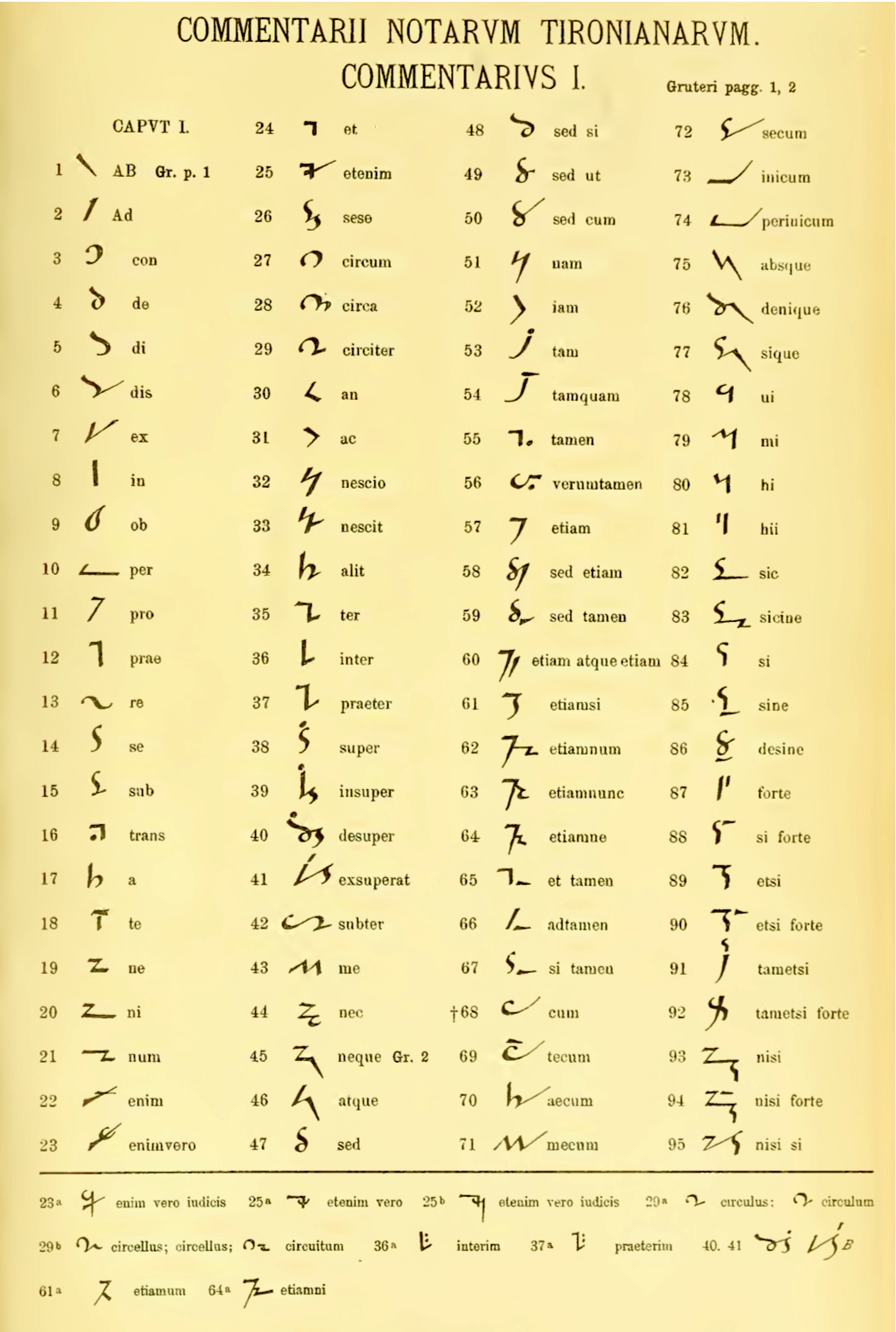

After Cicero's death, Tiro published some of his patron's speeches and letters, along with a collection of jokes and a biography; scholars believe the biography was later used as a main source in the historical works of Plutarch, Tacitus, and Aulus Gellius. He had started collecting and editing Cicero's correspondence by 46 or 45 BC. It seems Tiro also was a prolific writer himself: several ancient writers refer to works of Tiro, including a book on grammar. Aulus Gellius says, "[he] wrote several books on the usage and theory of the Latin language and on miscellaneous questions of various kinds", and quotes him on the difference between Greek and Latin names for certain stars. Asconius Pedianus, in his commentaries on Cicero's speeches, refers to a biography of Cicero by Tiro in at least four books, and Plutarch refers to him as a source for two incidents in Cicero's life.

He is credited with inventing the shorthand system of Tironian notes, later used by medieval monks, among others. There is no clear evidence that he did, although Plutarch credits Cicero's clerks as the first Romans to record speeches in shorthand.

== Tiro in fiction ==
- Tiro appears as a recurring character in Steven Saylor's Roma Sub Rosa crime fiction series, where he occupies the role of sometime sidekick to Saylor's investigator hero, Gordianus the Finder.
- He is the first-person narrator in the three books of Robert Harris's biographical-fiction trilogy of Cicero: Imperium (2006), Lustrum (2009, published in the US as Conspirata), and Dictator (2015).
- Tiro appears in several books in the SPQR series by John Maddox Roberts.
- Tiro (spelled Tyro) appears in the television historical drama Rome, played by Clive Riche in the episodes "Son of Hades", "These Being the Words of Marcus Tullius Cicero", "Heroes of the Republic", and "Philippi". This version of Tiro appears to be older than Cicero, and is only freed in Cicero's will.

== See also ==
- List of slaves
- Slavery in Ancient Rome
