= List of things named after Julius Caesar =

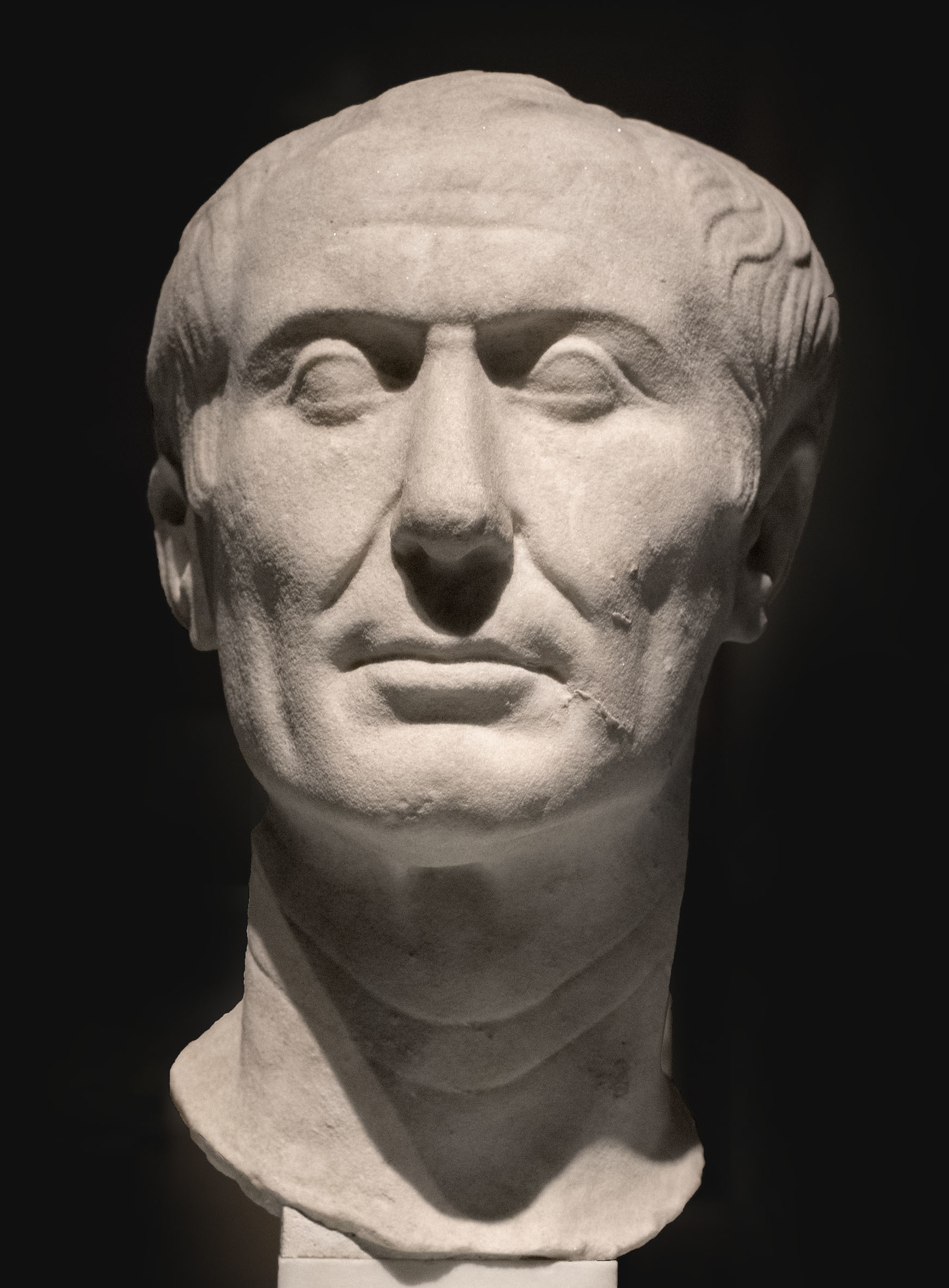
Caesar as portrayed by the Tusculum portrait

Gaius Julius Caesar (12 July 100 BC – 15 March 44 BC) was a Roman general, statesman, and author who played a key role in the collapse of the Roman Republic and the rise of the Roman Empire. He was a member of the First Triumvirate, an informal political alliance with Crassus and Pompey. Known for his military campaigns, including campaigns in Gaul, Caesar significantly expanded the Roman state. In 49 BC, Caesar initiated a civil war by taking his army across the Rubicon river and thus defying the Roman Senate's authority. His administrative reforms included the introduction of the Julian calendar, which aligned the Roman calendar with the solar year. Following decisive victories in the civil war, including the Battle of Pharsalus, Caesar assumed the title of dictator perpetuo ("dictator for life") at the start of 44 BC. Caesar's concentration of power led to his assassination on the Ides of March, 44 BC, by a group of senators. Following his death, he was deified by the Roman Senate, and the Temple of Caesar was built in the Roman Forum in his honor by his adoptive heir, Augustus.

Caesar's name and legacy have been preserved in numerous ways throughout history and cultures. Cities such as Casares and Cáceres trace their names back to him, as do geographical features like the Julian Alps. Astronomical entities, including a comet and a lunar crater, bear his name. Monuments like the Basilica Julia, commissioned by him, and the Caesareum of Alexandria are named in his memory. His influence extends to titles of kingship like "Tsar", "Kaiser" and "Caesar" and political concepts such as Caesarism and Caesaropapism. Several plays, operas, and films are named after him, including Shakespeare's The Tragedy of Julius Caesar and Chapman's Caesar and Pompey. Many operas, like Giulio Cesare in Egitto by Handel and Die Ermordung Cäsars by Klebe, also bear his name.

== Buildings and monuments ==
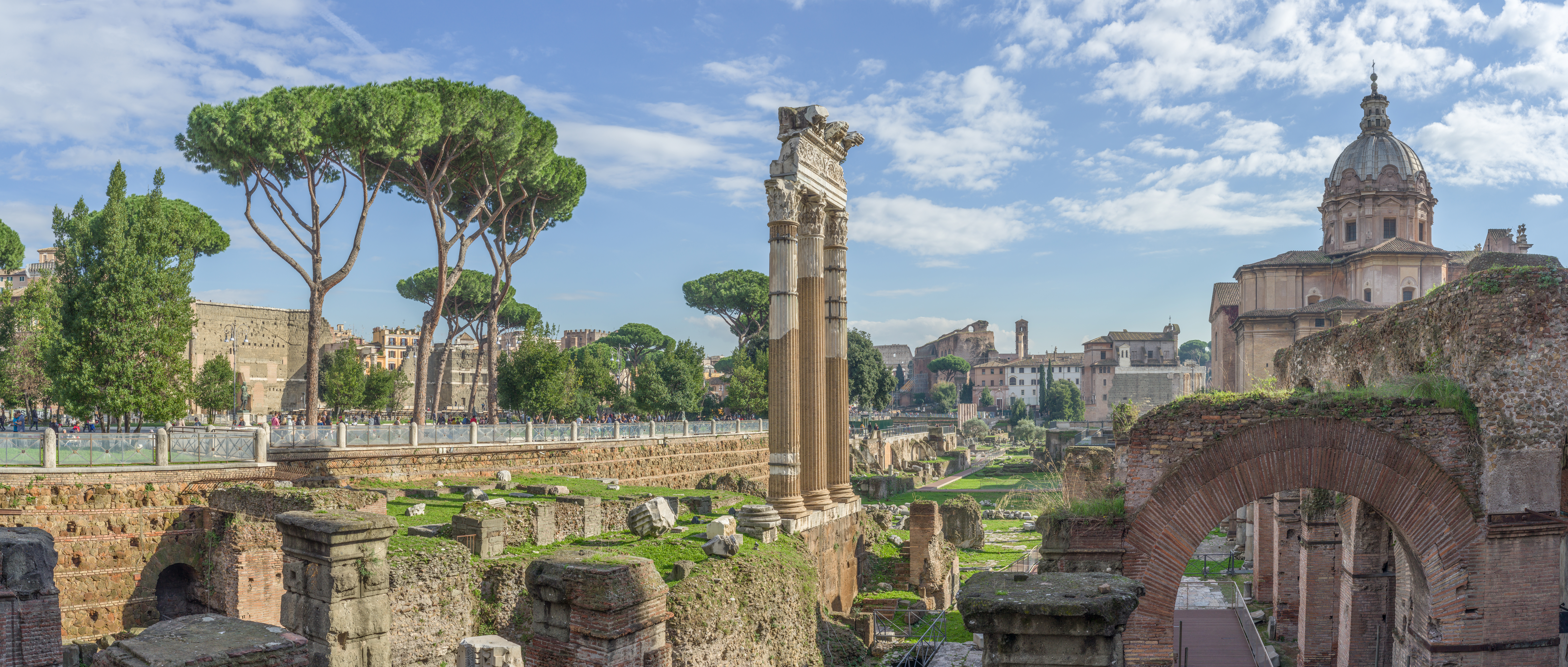
View of Forum of Caesar at Rome

- Basilica Julia—A building in the Roman Forum which was named after Caesar, who initiated its construction in 54 BC. The basilica was designed to serve as a public building for legal and commercial proceedings.
- Caesar's Rhine bridges—The first two bridges on record to cross the Rhine river, built by Caesar and his legionaries during the Gallic War in 55 and 53 BC.
- Caesareum of Alexandria—A temple in Alexandria, Egypt, believed to have been built by Cleopatra VII in honor of Caesar. (Note: It is believed to have been initially constructed by Cleopatra VII, in honor of Julius Caesar, but later repurposed by Augustus, possibly to honor himself.)
- Curia Julia—The third senate house in the Roman Forum, it was named after Caesar, who initiated its construction in 44 BC. Completed by Augustus in 29 BC, it replaced the earlier Curia Hostilia.
- Forum of Caesar (Latin: Forum Iulium)—It was named after Caesar in 54 BC, who initiated its construction to celebrate his military triumphs and provide a space for public affairs.
- Temple of Divus Julius—Built in the Roman Forum by Augustus in 29 BC, it was dedicated to Caesar following his posthumous deification by the Roman Senate in 42 BC.

== Celestial bodies ==
- 18458 Caesar—A minor planet discovered by Freimut Börngen at Karl Schwarzschild Observatory in 1995.
- Caesar's Comet—A cometary outburst seen in July 44 BC, following Caesar's assassination. The Romans believed it symbolized his ascension to divinity, and it was subsequently referred to as "Caesar's Comet" to honor his deification.
- Julius Caesar—A 85-kilometre-wide (53 mi) lunar crater located to the west of Mare Tranquillitatis, on the Mare Vaporum.

== Games ==
- Caesar—A board wargame initially self-published by Robert Bradley in 1970 under the title "Alesia", later republished by Avalon Hill in 1976 as Caesar. It simulates the Battle of Alesia.
- Hegemony Rome: The Rise of Caesar—It is a 2014 historical real-time strategy video game developed by Longbow Digital Arts and published by Kasedo Games for Microsoft Windows, which is set in the period of the Gallic Wars during the campaigns of Caesar.

== Geographic locations ==
- Cáceres—A city and municipality in Spain. Though no consensus has been reached regarding the etymology of Cáceres, it is believed to have evolved from the name of the colony Norba Caesarina, which received the cognomen Caesarina in memory of Julius Caesar.
- Casares—A town and municipality in Spain. According to legend, Caesar founded the town after curing his skin condition by bathing in the baths of La Hedionda.
- Forum Julii (modern name: Fréjus)—A French commune located at the mouth of the Argens valley, which was founded or expanded by Julius Caesar around 49 BC as a market and provisioning center.
- Friuli-Venezia Giulia—An autonomous region in Italy. The name Friuli originates from the Latin term Forum Julii ('Julius's forum'), a Roman-era commercial hub that corresponds to the modern city of Cividale.
- Julian Alps—A mountain range of the Southern Limestone Alps that stretch from north-eastern Italy to Slovenia, named after Caesar perhaps due to a road started by him and completed by Augustus.

== Novels and books ==
- Caesar—A 1993 historical novel by Scottish writer Allan Massie, the third in the author's series of novels about the early Roman emperors.
- Caesar, Life of a Colossus—A biography of Julius Caesar written by Adrian Goldsworthy and published in 2006 by Yale University Press.
- Life of Caesar—A biography of Julius Caesar written in Ancient Greek in the beginning of the 2nd century AD by the Greek moralist Plutarch, as part of his Parallel Lives.
- The Judgment of Caesar—A historical novel by American author Steven Saylor, first published by St. Martin's Press in 2004. It is the tenth book in his Roma Sub Rosa series.
- The Throne of Caesar—A historical mystery novel by American author Steven Saylor, first published by Minotaur Books in 2018. It is the thirteenth book in his Roma Sub Rosa series.
- The Triumph of Caesar—A historical novel by American author Steven Saylor, first published by St. Martin's Press in 2008. It is the twelfth book in his Roma Sub Rosa series.

== Films ==
- Caesar and Cleopatra—A 1945 British Technicolor film directed by Gabriel Pascal that was adapted from the play Caesar and Cleopatra (1901) by George Bernard Shaw.
- Cesare deve morire (Caesar Must Die)—A 2012 Italian drama film directed by Paolo and Vittorio Taviani, based on Shakespeare's play.
- Jail Caesar—A 2012 British-South African-Canadian historical drama film written and directed by Paul Schoolman.
- Julius Caesar—Based on William Shakespeare's tragedy, it is a 1908 silent short film directed by William V. Ranous.
- Julius Caesar—A 1914 Italian silent historical film directed by Enrico Guazzoni, it was based on Shakespeare's play.
- Julius Caesar—A 1950 film adaptation of Shakespeare's play, directed by David Bradley.
- Julius Caesar—A 1953 American film adaptation of Shakespeare's play, directed by Joseph L. Mankiewicz.
- Julius Caesar—A 1970 film adaptation of Shakespeare's play, directed by Stuart Burge.
- Julius Caesar—A 2012 theatrical production by British theatre director Phyllida Lloyd, it is a loose adaptation of Shakespeare's play.
- Julius Caesar Against the Pirates—A 1962 Italian adventure film written and directed by Sergio Grieco, which is loosely based on actual events from the early life of Julius Caesar.
- Shakespeare Writing "Julius Caesar"—A 1907 French short silent film directed by Georges Méliès. The film, currently presumed lost, featured Méliès himself as a William Shakespeare moving from frustration to excitement as he imagines and plans a scene for his play Caesar.

== Paintings ==
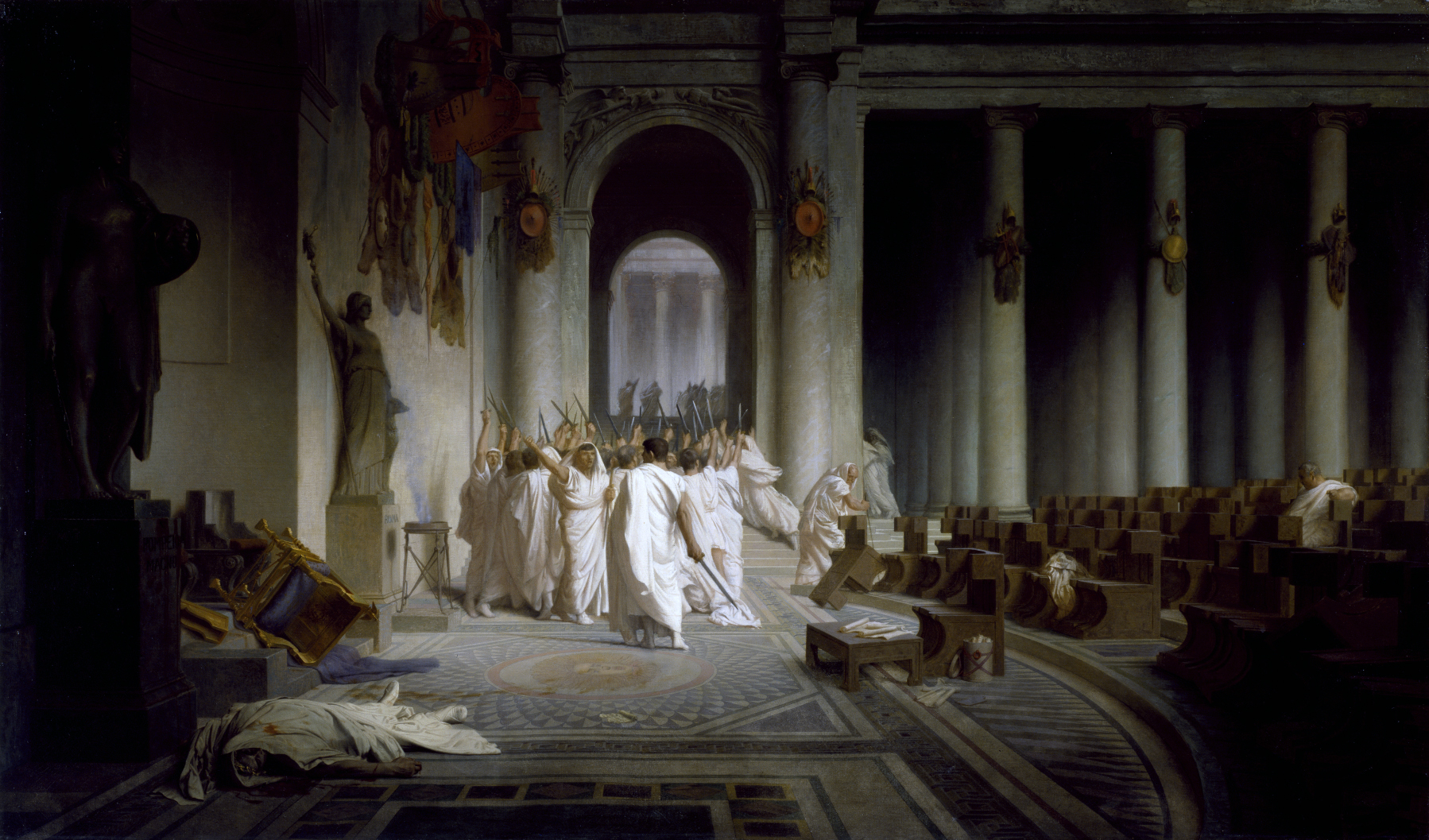
The Death of Caesar, an 1867 painting by Jean-Léon Gérôme

- Caesar Restoring Cleopatra to the Throne of Egypt—An oil on canvas painting by Pietro da Cortona that depicts Julius Caesar and Cleopatra VII.
- Cleopatra and Caesar—An oil on canvas painting by the French artist Jean-Léon Gérôme that depicts Cleopatra emerging from a carpet in the presence of Julius Caesar.
- The Assassination of Caesar—An oil canvas painting by German artist Heinrich Füger, created in 1818, it depicts the assassination of Julius Caesar.
- The Assassination of Julius Caesar—An 1888 painting by William Holmes Sullivan which depicts the assassination of Julius Caesar at the hands of his fellow senators.
- The death of Caesar—A painting by Flemish artist Victor Honoré Janssens between 1658 and 1736 which depicts Caesar's assassination.
- The Death of Julius Caesar—An 1806 painting by Italian Neoclassical painter Vincenzo Camuccini depicting Caesar's assassination.
- The Death of Caesar—An 1867 painting by the French artist Jean-Léon Gérôme that depicts the moment after the assassination of Julius Caesar, when the conspirators are walking away from Caesar's dead body at the Theatre of Pompey, on the Ides of March (March 15), 44 BC.
- The Murder of Caesar—A 1865 painting by Karl von Piloty which depicts the assassination of Julius Caesar.
- Tribute to Caesar—A fresco created by Andrea del Sarto and Alessandro Allori it depicts a laurel-wreathed Caesar receiving ambassadors.
- Triumphs of Caesar—Painted by the Italian Renaissance artist Andrea Mantegna between 1484 and 1492, these are a series of nine large paintings that depict a triumphal military parade celebrating the victory of Julius Caesar in the Gallic Wars.

== Ships ==
- Italian battleship Giulio Cesare—A Conte di Cavour-class dreadnought battleship of the Regia Marina. She served from 1914 to 1955, including roles in both World Wars and later as a Soviet training ship.
- HMS Caesar (1793)—An 80-gun third-rate ship of the line of the Royal Navy, designed by Edward Hunt and launched on 1793 at Plymouth.
- HMS Caesar (1896)—A Majestic-class pre-dreadnought battleship of the Royal Navy. She served from 1898 to 1921, including roles in the Atlantic Ocean, the Mediterranean Sea, and as a depot ship during World War I.
- HMS Caesar (R07)—A C-class destroyer built for the Royal Navy during the Second World War, commissioned in 1944 and named after Caesar.
- USS Caesar—A collier for the United States Navy. She was built in England in 1896 and scrapped in Japan in 1935. In the US Navy, she served in various wars including the Spanish–American War, Philippine–American War and World War I.

== Time-keeping ==
- Julian calendar—The calendar introduced by Caesar in 45 BC was named in his honor. It reformed the Roman calendar to align more closely with the solar year.
- Julian year (symbol: a or a_{j})—An astronomical unit of measurement of time defined as exactly 365.25 days of 86,400 seconds each. The length of the Julian year is the average length of the year in the Julian calendar, from which the unit is named.
- July—The seventh month of the year in the Julian and Gregorian calendars, originally known as Quintilis (Latin for 'five'), the month was renamed to Julius by the Roman Senate in honor of Caesar in 44 BC, as it was the month of his birth. (Note: The name of the month July originated from Latin Iulius, named after Julius Caesar. It evolved through Anglo-French as julie and Old French as Juil or Jule, eventually becoming July in modern English.)

== Popular culture ==
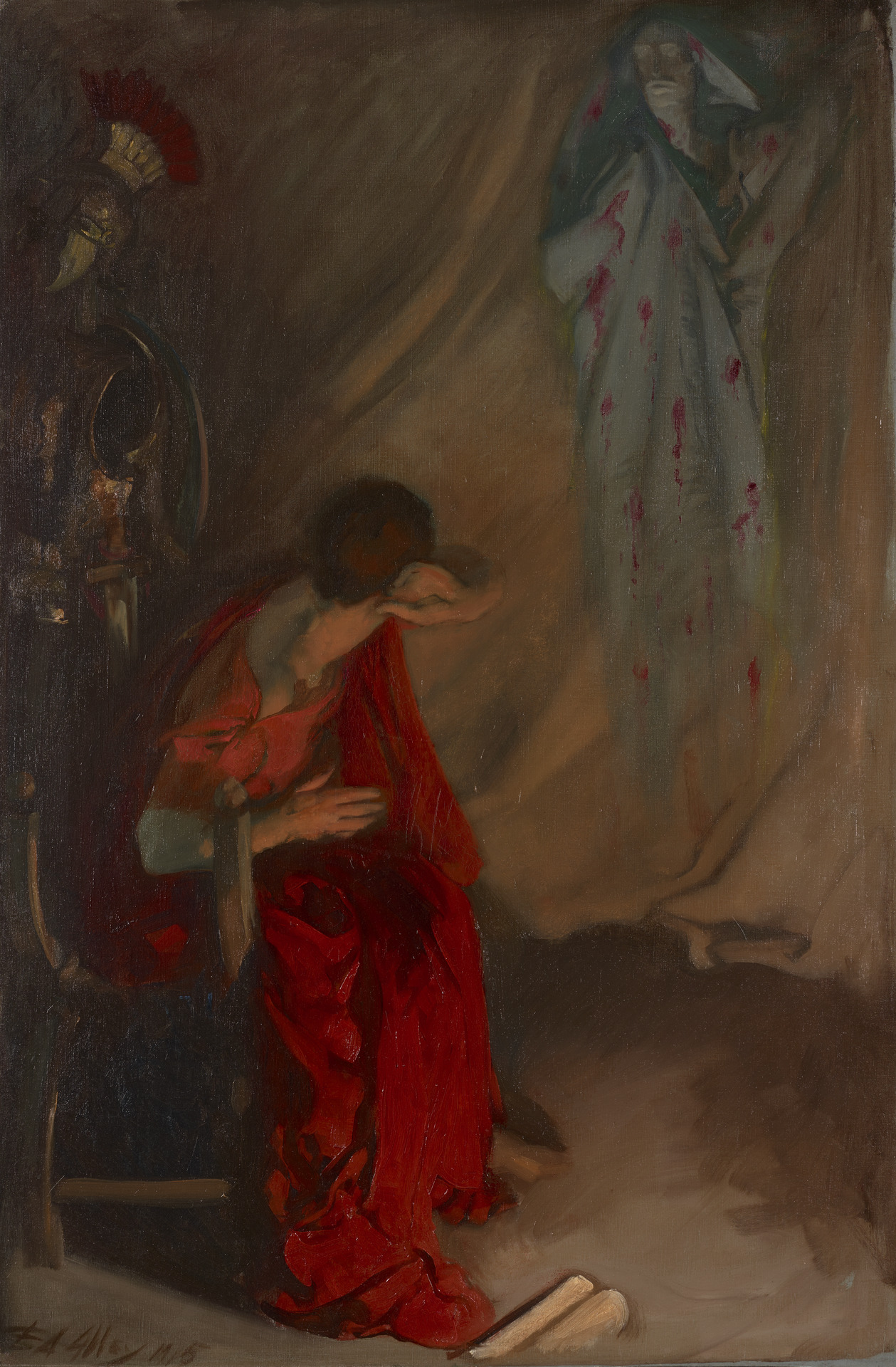
Edwin Austin Abbey – Within the Tent of Brutus, Enter the Ghost of Caesar, Julius Caesar, Act IV, Scene III

- Caesar—A modern-dress adaptation of Shakespeare's play, directed by Orson Welles and produced by the Mercury Theatre.
- Caesar—A fictional chimpanzee who appears as a character in several films from the Planet of the Apes media franchise. The character typically plays a leadership role in the films, guiding other apes to freedom, in an echo of tropes associated with Julius Caesar.
- Caesar and Cleopatra—An 1898 play by Irish playwright George Bernard Shaw that depicts a fictionalized account of the relationship between Julius Caesar and Cleopatra.
- Caesar and Pompey—A Jacobean era stage play, a classical tragedy written by English dramatist George Chapman.
- Die Ermordung Cäsars (The Murder of Caesar)—A one-act opera by German composer Giselher Klebe, who wrote the libretto based on August Wilhelm Schlegel's translation of Shakespeare's play.
- Dead Caesar—A 2007 satirical stage show by Australian comedian Chris Taylor, parodying William Shakespeare's Julius Caesar.
- Giulio Cesare in Egitto (Julius Caesar in Egypt)—A dramma per musica (opera seria) in three acts composed by German–British Baroque composer George Frideric Handel for the Royal Academy of Music in 1724, the plot of which is loosely based on historical events during the Roman Civil War of 49–45 BC.
- Heil Caesar—A 1973 BBC television drama produced by Ronald Smedley, and based on an adaptation by John Bowen of Shakespeare's play Julius Caesar.
- Julius Caesar—A marble statue of Caesar, created by the Italian sculptor Andrea Ferrucci in the early 16th century.
- Julius Caesar—A concert overture written in 1851 by Robert Schumann, inspired by Shakespeare's play Julius Caesar.
- Julius Caesar—A 1979 episode of BBC Television Shakespeare, a series of British television adaptations of Shakespeare's plays.
- Julius Caesar—A 2002 miniseries directed by Uli Edel, which portrays key events from his life and rise to power.
- Julius Caesar: The Making of a Dictator—A three-part BBC-produced historical docudrama that depicts Caesar's rise and fall, detailing his ambitions, political maneuvers, alliances, and conquests.
- La morte di Cesare (The Death of Caesar)—A three-act opera seria by Italian composer Francesco Bianchi with a libretto by Gaetano Sertor, inspired by Shakespeare's play.
- The Chiaramonti Caesar—A marble statue of Caesar, located in the Chiaramonti Museum, part of the Vatican Museums.
- The Tragedy of Julius Caesar—A historical play and tragedy, written by William Shakespeare, which centers around the assassination of Julius Caesar.
- Young Caesar—A 1970 opera written by American composer Lou Harrison, depicting the younger years of Julius Caesar.

== Others ==
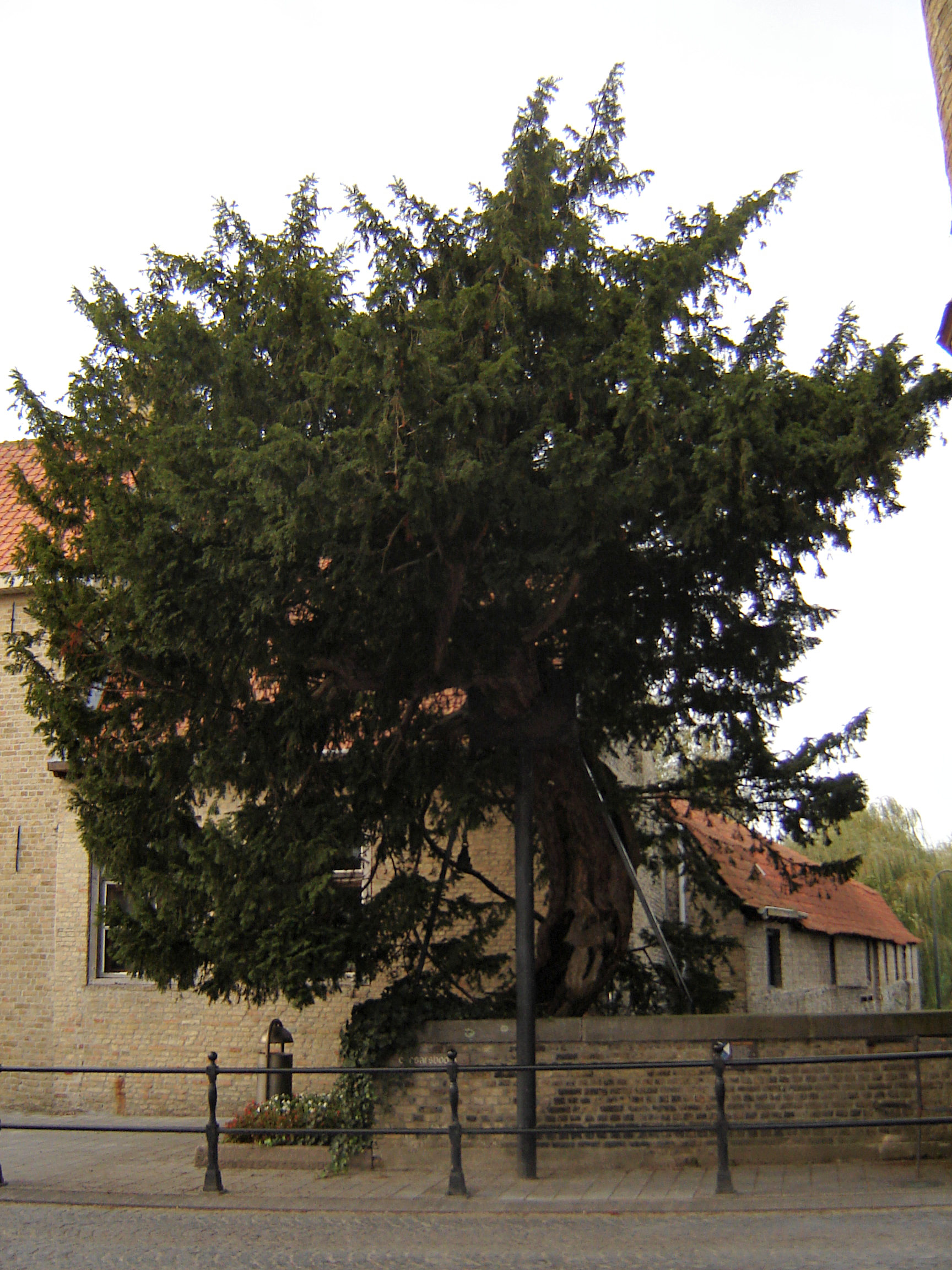
Caesarsboom in Lo, Belgium

- Amanita caesarea—The common name is derived from the title Caesar (originally a family name) of the Roman emperors.
- Caesar—A title of imperial character. It derives from the cognomen of Caesar.
- Caesar cipher (or Caesar shift)—One of the simplest and most widely known encryption techniques. It is named after Caesar, who, according to Suetonius, used it with a shift of three (A becoming D when encrypting, and D becoming A when decrypting) to protect messages of military significance.
- Caesarism—In political science, it refers to an authoritarian and populist ideology modeled after Caesar's autocratic rule as Rome's dictator from 49 to 44 BC.
- Caesaropapism—The term is composed of two parts: Caesar, a title, and Papism.
- Caesarean section—Though often thought to be named after Julius Caesar, the term may instead derive from the Latin verb caedare, meaning "to cut", or from Lex Caesarea, formerly Lex Regia. (Note: Speculations that Julius Caesar was born by what is now known as a C-section are false; however, this incorrect etymology was widely repeated until recently. For instance, the 1989 edition of the Oxford English Dictionary (OED) claimed that caesarean birth "was done in the case of Julius Cæsar." More recent dictionaries take a more cautious approach: the online edition of the OED (2021) refers to "the traditional belief that Julius Cæsar was delivered this way," while Merriam-Webster's Collegiate Dictionary (2003) mentions "the legendary association of such a delivery with the Roman cognomen Caesar.")
- Caesarsboom—An individual tree, believed to be over 2000 years old, located in Lo, Belgium. According to local legend, Caesar stopped there during his 55 BC military campaign en route to Britannia.

== See also ==
- Cultural depictions of Julius Caesar
