= Cultural depictions of Julius Caesar =

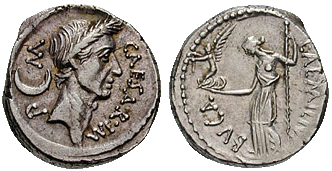
44 BC denarius

Gaius Julius Caesar (100 BC – 44 BC), one of the most influential men in world history, has frequently appeared in literary and artistic works since ancient times.

== Ancient works ==
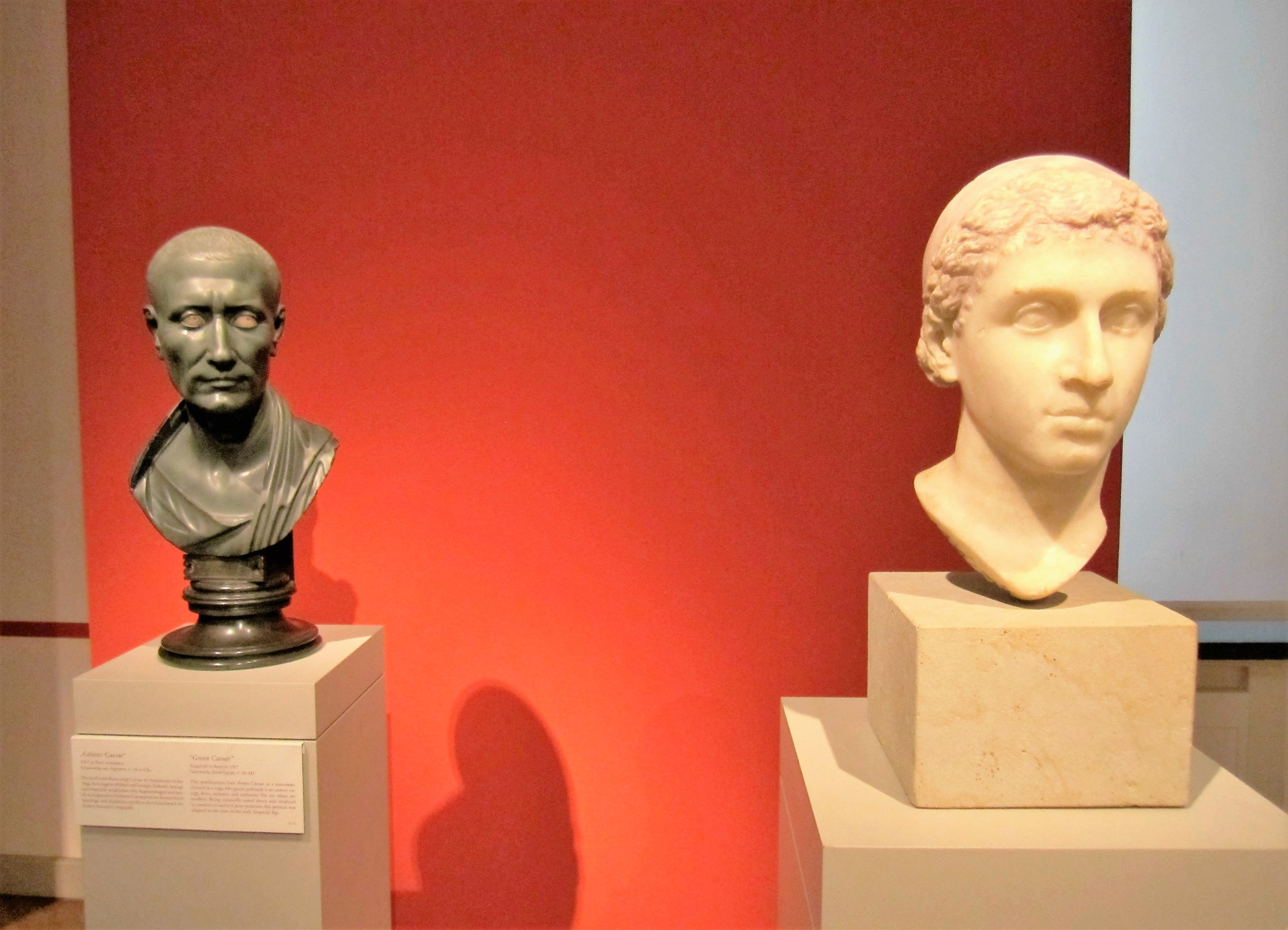
The ancient Roman busts of Julius Caesar and Cleopatra in the Altes Museum, Berlin

- Caesar is referred to in some of the poems of Catullus (c. 84 – c. 54 BC)
- The Commentarii de Bello Gallico (c. 58 – 49 BC) and the Commentarii de Bello Civili (c. 40 BC) are two autobiographical works Caesar used to justify his actions and cement popular support
- The Tusculum portrait is possibly the only surviving portrait from Caesar's lifetime (c. 50 – 40 BC)
- The Chiaramonti Caesar is the other surviving and accepted bust of Caesar produced before the Roman Empire
- He is depicted in Virgil's Aeneid (c. 29 – 19 BC), an epic poem about the foundation of Rome
- The original Pantheon built by Marcus Agrippa (c. 29 – 19 BC) contained a statue of Caesar alongside statues of Augustus Caesar and Agrippa. The statue was potentially destroyed when the Pantheon burned down in 80 AD.
- He appears as a character in Lucan's Pharsalia (AD 61), an epic poem based on Caesar's Civil War
- The Life of Caesar is one of the Parallel Lives written by the Greek moralist Plutarch c. 112 AD. Caesar is paired with Alexander the Great.

== Medieval works ==
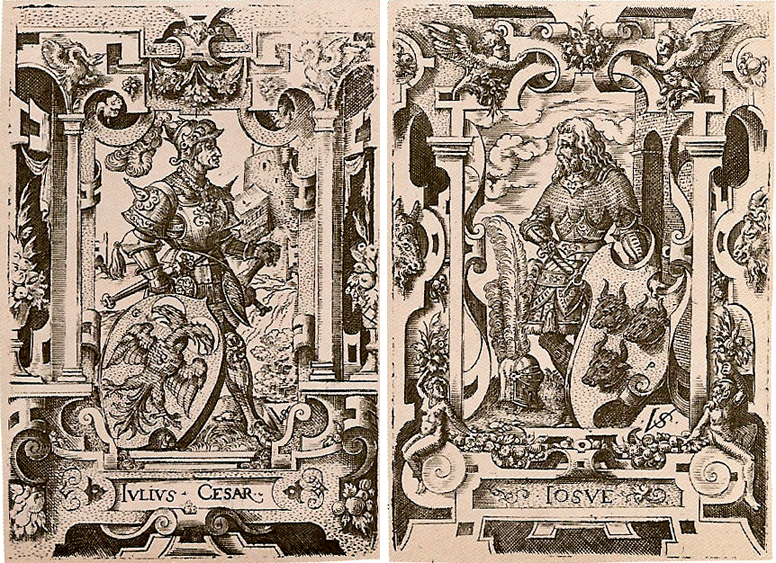
Caesar and Joshua as part of the Nine Worthies (16th century)

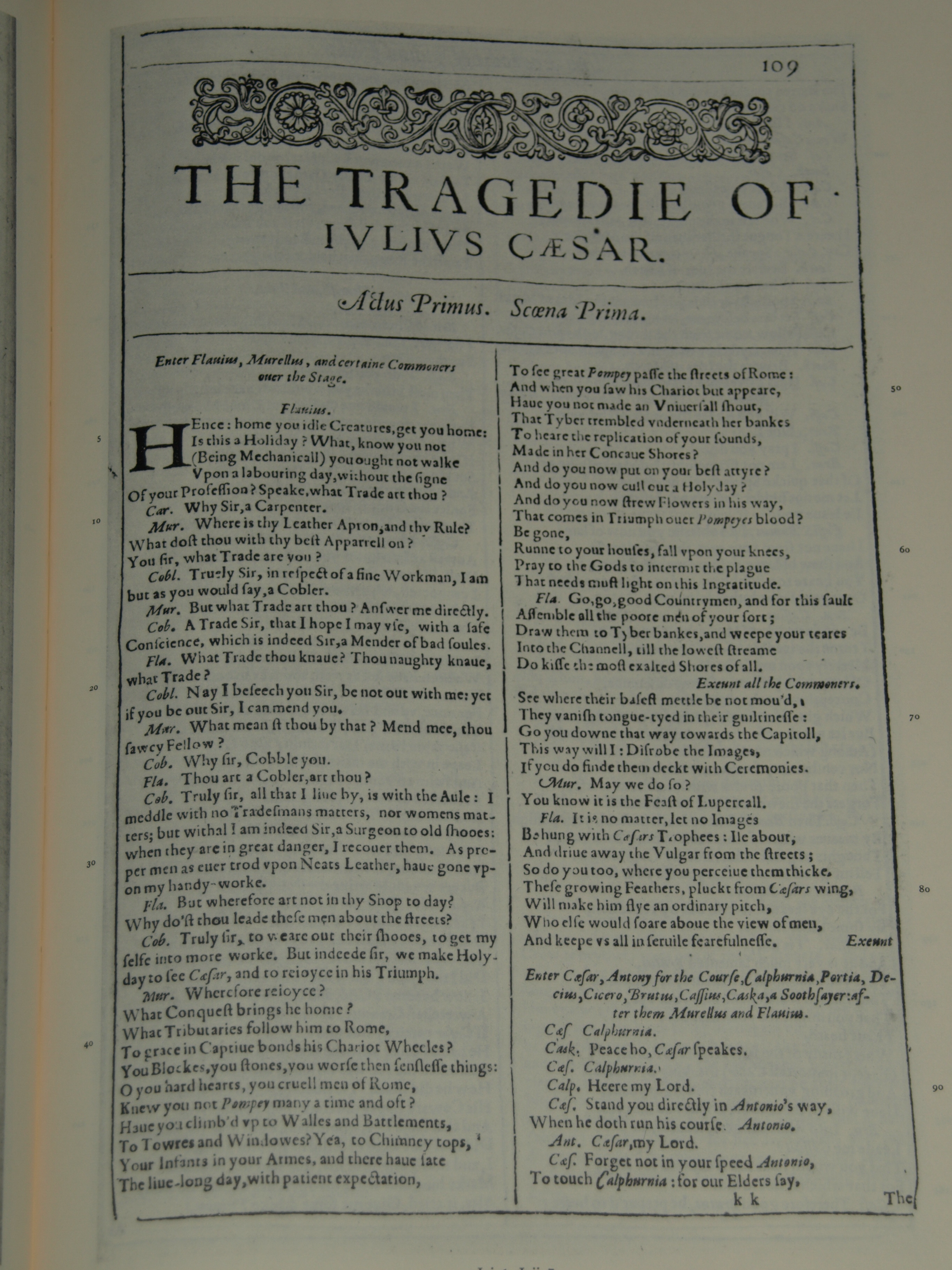
Shakespeare's First Folio

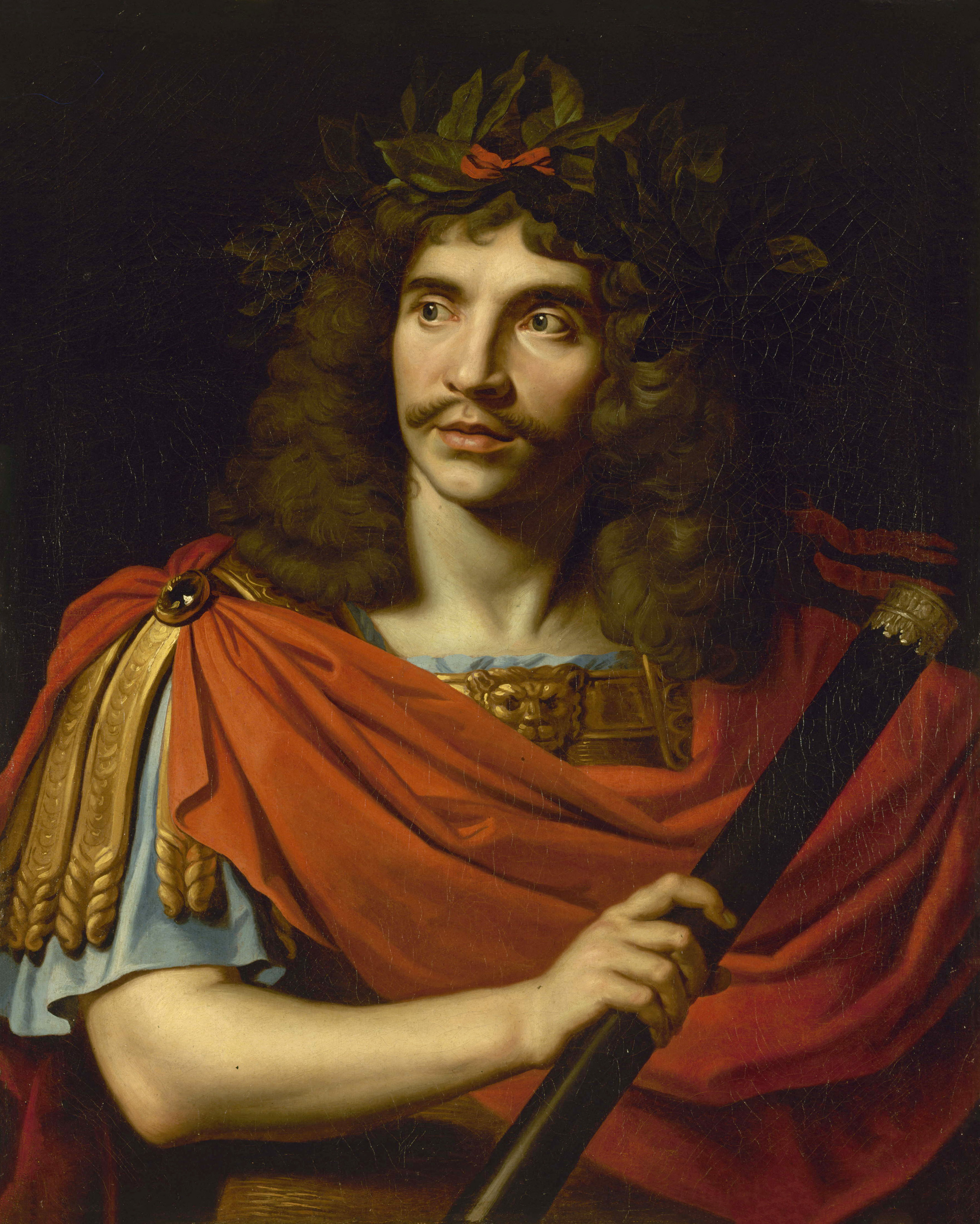
Molière in the role of Julius Caesar, painting by Nicolas Mignard, 1656

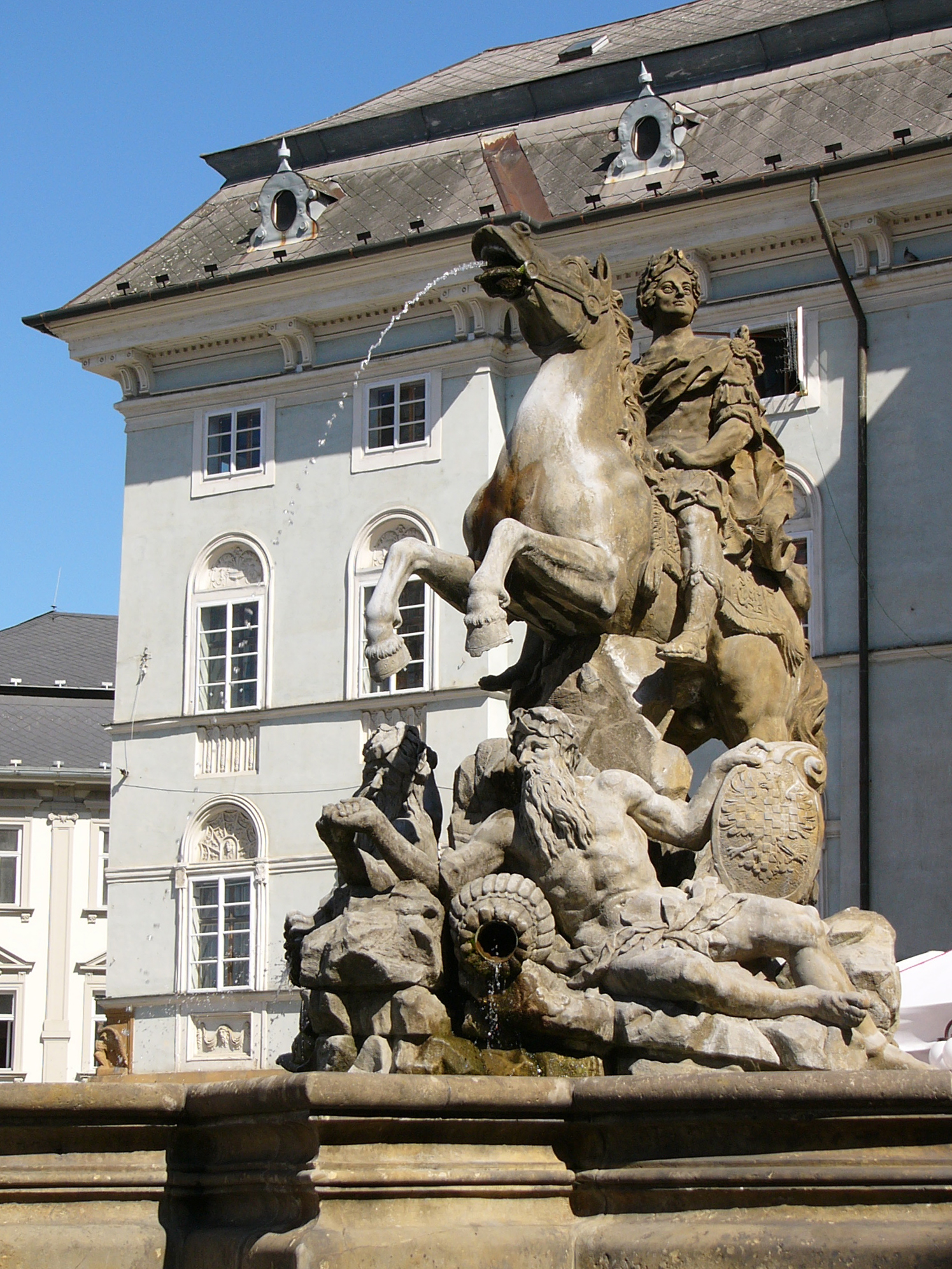
Fountain in Olomouc

- A legendary account of Caesar's invasions of Britain appears in Geoffrey of Monmouth's Historia Regum Britanniae (c. 1136).
- In the 13th century French romance Faits des Romains, Caesar is made a bishop.
- In the 13th century French chanson de geste Huon of Bordeaux, the fairy king Oberon is the son of Caesar and Morgan le Fay.
- Caesar appears in Canto IV of Dante Alighieri's epic poem, the Divine Comedy (c. 1308–1321). He is in the section of Limbo reserved for virtuous non-Christians, along with Aeneas, Homer, Ovid, Horace and Lucan. His assassins, Brutus and Cassius, and his lover, Cleopatra, are seen among the souls of the wicked in the lower regions of hell.
- Caesar was included as one of the Nine Worthies by Jacques de Longuyon in Voeux du Paon (1312). These were nine historical, scriptural, mythological or semi-legendary figures who, in the Middle Ages, were believed to personify the ideals of chivalry.
- Caesar's Civil War and assassination are recounted in Geoffrey Chaucer's "Monk's Tale" (c. 1385, one of his Canterbury Tales)
- Italian sculptor, Andrea Ferrucci, produced a marble bust of Caesar c. 1512-1514. As of 2026, this bust is held by the Metropolitan Museum of Art.

== Renaissance and modern works ==
- In Historia de omnibus Gothorum Sueonumque regibus (History of all Kings of Goths and Swedes) by Johannes Magnus, published in 1554. Caesar appears as a contemporary of the Swedish King Lindormus.

=== Theatre ===
- William Shakespeare's Julius Caesar (1599)
- George Chapman's Caesar and Pompey (c. 1604)
- William Alexander's Julius Caesar (1607)
- Ben Jonson's Catiline His Conspiracy (1611)
- John Fletcher and Philip Massinger's The False One (c. 1620)
- Jasper Fisher's Fuimus Troes (c. 1625)
- Pierre Corneille's The Death of Pompey (1642)
- Robert Garnier's Cornélie (1573)
- Thomas Kyd's Cornelia (1594)

=== Operas ===
- Giulio Cesare (1724), George Frideric Handel
- La morte di Cesare (1788), Francesco Bianchi
- Die Ermordung Cäsars (1959), Giselher Klebe
- Young Caesar (1970), Lou Harrison

=== Statues ===
- Fountain of Caesar in Olomouc (1725). It is based on the statue by Gian Lorenzo Bernini depicting Constantine the Great in Scala Regia (Vatican).

=== Paintings ===
- The Death of Caesar (1798) by Vincenzo Camuccini

== Modern works ==
=== Theatre ===
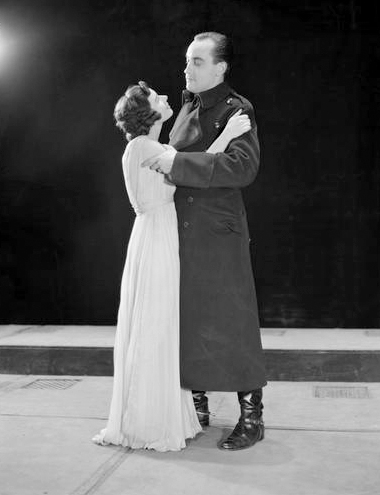
Joseph Holland as Julius Caesar in the Mercury Theatre's Broadway production of Caesar (1937)

- Caesar and Cleopatra (1898) by George Bernard Shaw
- Caesar (adapted from Shakespeare's play, 1937), Orson Welles's modern-dress bare-stage adaptation that evoked comparison to contemporary Fascist Italy and Nazi Germany.

=== Fiction ===
- In Jonathan Swift's 1726 satire Gulliver's Travels, Gulliver has a conversation with evocations of Caesar and Brutus and Caesar confesses that all his glory does not equal the glory Brutus gained by murdering him.
- Cleopatra (1889) by Rider Haggard, a historical novel, depicts Julius Caesar's relationship with Cleopatra.
- A Friend of Caesar: A Tale of the Fall of the Roman Republic (1900) by William Stearns Davis, follows a young nobleman who accompanies Caesar on his rise to power.
- The Story of the Amulet (1905), a children's time-travel novel by E. Nesbit, includes an episode with Julius Caesar on the eve of his invasion of Britain.
- The Magic City (1910), a children's fantasy novel by E. Nesbit, has Julius Caesar emerge from the pages of De Bello Gallico to rout the barbarians.
- Tros of Samothrace (1934), a historical novel by Talbot Mundy, has Julius Caesar as the novel's villain.
- Freedom, Farewell! (1936) by Phyllis Bentley depicts Caesar as a tyrant.
- The Ides of March (1948), is an epistolary novel by Thornton Wilder.
- The City of Libertines (1957), The Scarlet Mantle: A Novel of Julius Caesar (1978), and The Bloodied Toga: A Novel of Julius Caesar (1979) by the Canadian novelist W. G. Hardy, are a trilogy of novels covering Caesar's life.
- Young Caesar (1958) and its sequel Imperial Caesar (1960), novels focusing on Caesar's life by Rex Warner.
- First Citizen (1987), by Thomas Thurston Thomas, a science fiction book based on the life and times of Julius Caesar but set in the 21st century.
- Sword of Caesar (1987), in the Time Machine series, asks the reader to travel back to ancient Rome and find the fate of Caesar's battle sword.
- Masters of Rome, a series of seven novels by the Australian writer, Colleen McCullough: The First Man in Rome (1991), The Grass Crown (1991), Fortune's Favorites (1993), Caesar's Women (1995), Caesar (1997), The October Horse (2002), and Antony and Cleopatra (2007).
- Roma Sub Rosa (1991–2018), a series of historical mysteries by the American writer, Steven Saylor.
- Emperor, a series of five novels by the British writer, Conn Iggulden: The Gates of Rome (2003), The Death of Kings (2004), The Field of Swords (2005), The Gods of War (2006), and The Blood of Gods (2013).
- The Cicero Trilogy by Robert Harris: Imperium (2006), Lustrum (2009), and Dictator (2015).

=== Film ===
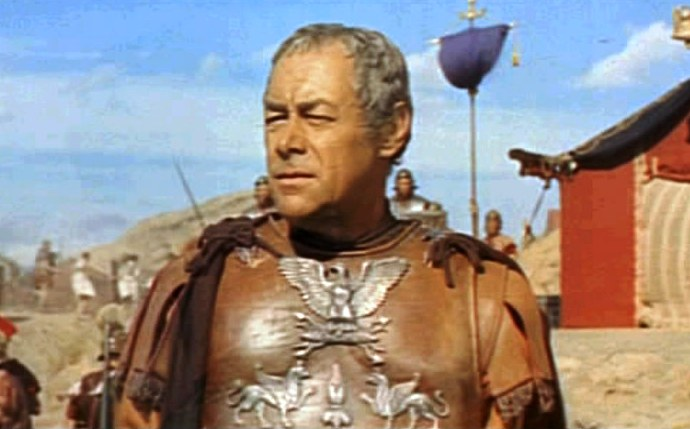
Rex Harrison as Caesar in Cleopatra (1963)

- Cleopatra (1917) (Fritz Leiber)
- Cleopatra (1934) (Warren William)
- Caesar and Cleopatra (1945) (Claude Rains)
- The Bishop's Wife (1947): Dudley states that Wutheridge's coin was struck by Caesar to pay for Cleopatra's visit to Rome
- Julius Caesar (1950) (Harold Tasker)
- Julius Caesar (1953) (Louis Calhern)
- Spartacus (1960) (John Gavin)
- Julius Caesar Against the Pirates (1962) (Gustavo Rojo)
- Cleopatra (1963) (Rex Harrison)
- Carry On Cleo (1964) (Kenneth Williams)
- Julius Caesar (1970) (John Gielgud)
- Asterix & Obelix Take On Caesar (1999) (Gottfried John)
- Druids (2001) (Klaus Maria Brandauer)
- Asterix & Obelix: Mission Cleopatra (2002) (Alain Chabat)
- Asterix at the Olympic Games (2008) (Alain Delon)
- Asterix and Obelix: God Save Britannia (2012) (Fabrice Luchini)
- Asterix and Obelix: Mansion of the Gods (2014) (Jim Broadbent)

=== Television ===
- African Queens, 2023 Netflix (John Partridge)
- Bewitched: "Samantha's Caesar Salad", Aunt Esmerelda tries to conjure up a Caesar salad, but conjures up Caesar, played by Jay Robinson
- Monty Python's Flying Circus: played by Graham Chapman in the sketches The Mouse Problem and Julius Caesar on an Aldis lamp, played by Eric Idle in the sketch Historical Impersonations.
- Cleopatra, played by Timothy Dalton
- Histeria!: Caesar's physical appearance is based on Frank Sinatra
- Horrible Histories, played by Ben Willbond/Adam Riches
- Julius Caesar played by Jeremy Sisto
- Empire, played by Colm Feore
- Rome, played by Ciarán Hinds
- Spartacus, a 2004 television film adaption of the Howard Fast novel- Caesar, played by Richard Dillane is a minor role
- Spartacus: War of the Damned, stars a younger Caesar played by Todd Lasance
- Ancient Rome: The Rise and Fall of an Empire, a BBC documentary; played by Sean Pertwee
- Roman Empire, a Netflix documentary series, devotes its 2nd season to discussing his life. He is portrayed by Ditch Davey in the dramatic reconstructions.
- Wayne and Shuster's "Rinse the Blood off My Toga" spoofs Shakespeare's Julius Caesar as a Dragnet episode
- Xena: Warrior Princess and once on Hercules: The Legendary Journeys: Caesar was a major antagonist, played by Karl Urban
- SCTV: in a 1980 episode in which Bobby Bitman (Eugene Levy) portrays Caesar in a live television broadcast of the Shakespeare play telling bad jokes, which is then interrupted by a Russian satellite cutting into the broadcast feed of SCTV and showing Russian TV.
- DC's Legends of Tomorrow, Caesar is portrayed by Simon Merrells in the season three episode "Aruba-Con", where Caesar is displaced in time and ends up in Aruba in 2018, as well as in the season's finale, "The Good, the Bad, and the Cuddly", where he is possessed by the demon Mallus.
- Time Squad Caesar is voiced by Tom Kenny in three episodes "To Hail With Caesar", "The Prime Minister Has No Clothes" and "Shop Like an Egyptian"

=== Radio ===
- In "The Histories of Pliny the Elder" – a 1958 episode of the British radio comedy "The Goon Show" parodying epic films – Caesar is portrayed by Peter Sellers as Hercules Grytpype-Thynne, with Moriarty as a centurion and sidekick.
- In the BBC Radio 4 series Caesar! (2003–2007) written by Mike Walker, David Troughton played Julius Caesar in "Meeting at Formiae", the first episode of Series One.
- In the "Life of Caesar" Podcast, by Cameron Reilly and Ray Harris Jr., which ran from 2013 to 2015 and continued onto Octavian in August 2015.

=== Comics ===
- A depiction of the Gallic War Commentaries of Caesar's, entitled "Caesar's Conquests", appeared in the now defunct Classics Illustrated comic series from the 1940s to the 1970s.
- The Adventures of Alix, where he is the political protector of the main character.
- Asterix comics, written by René Goscinny and drawn by Albert Uderzo, include a fictionalized Julius Caesar (complete with Roman nose) in a number of stories.
- Caesar appears in Neil Gaiman's Sandman #30, "August" (collected in The Sandman: Fables & Reflections).

=== Games ===
- Where in Time is Carmen Sandiego features Julius Caesar in one of its stages.
- Caesar is depicted as Akihiko Sanada's ultimate persona in Persona 3.
- Fallout: New Vegas depicts a dictator who patterns himself after the various Caesares, Julius in particular.
- Julius Caesar appears as the leader of the Roman Empire in several instalments of the Civilization series of strategy games.
- Caesar is mentioned in Assassin's Creed: Brotherhood as being a Templar, and that his assassination by Brutus and other members of the Assassins is to prevent the Templars from gaining power in Rome.
- Caesar is also an important character in Assassin's Creed Origins, which depicts the Siege of Alexandria and the Battle of the Nile. Caesar is initially allied with the main protagonists, Bayek and Aya, but is shown to be working with the Order of the Ancients, an early incarnation of the Templars. Near the end of the game, Aya travels to Rome and is the first person to stab Caesar at his assassination.
- In Age of Empires: The Rise of Rome, a player can act as Julius Caesar.
- Gaius Julius Caesar appears as a servant in the mobile game Fate/Grand Order, summoned as the class of Saber.
- In the Total War: Rome 2 expansion Caesar in Gaul as a playable General.
- Julius Caesar is able to be summoned in Scribblenauts and its sequels.
- Caesar is depicted as the primary villain in A Courtesan of Rome, an interactive visual novel released in 2019 by Pixelberry Studios via their Choices: Stories You Play mobile app.

== See also ==
- List of things named after Julius Caesar
- Et tu, Brute?
