= Young Caesar =

Young Caesar maybe refer to:

- Young Caesar (novel), a 1958 novel
- Young Caesar (opera), a 1970 opera
