= Arles bust =

Presumed bust of Caesar

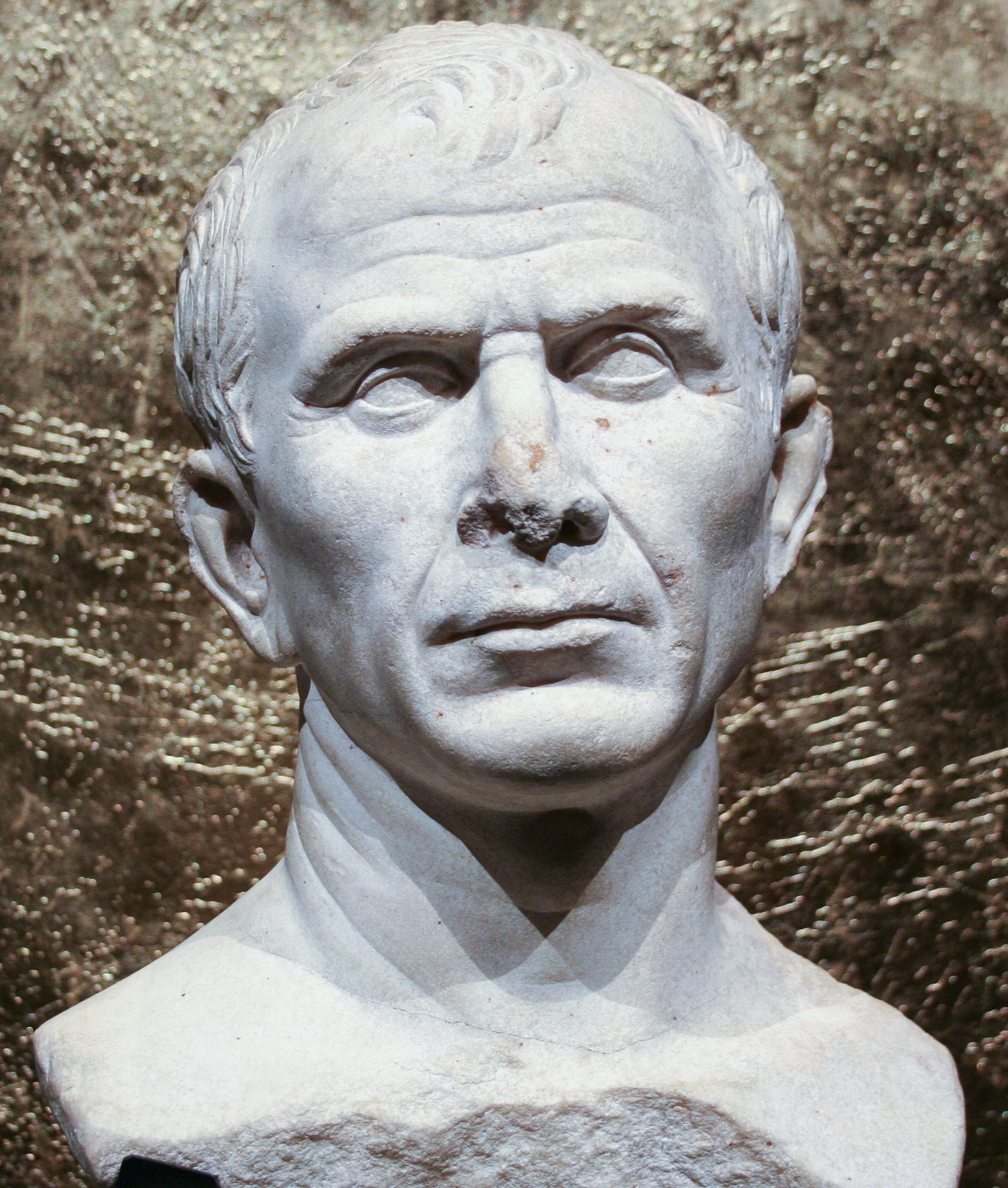
Marble bust found in the Rhone River near Arles

The Arles bust is a life-sized marble bust of a man, possibly Julius Caesar, dating to around the 1st century BC. It is part of the collection of the Musée de l'Arles antique.

It was discovered in September–October 2007 in the Rhone River near Arles, southern France, by divers from the French Department of Subaquatic Archaeological Research. During the same campaign, divers also recovered smaller statues of Marsyas in Hellenistic style and a life-size marble sculpture of Neptune dating, from its style, to the 3rd century AD.

== Analysis ==
The realism of the portrait places it in the tradition of late Republican Roman portrait and genre sculptures of the 1st century BC. The archaeologists who discovered the bust claimed that it was a portrait of Julius Caesar, and dated it to approximately 46 BC, making it the oldest known representation of Caesar, according to France's Minister of Culture, Christine Albanel. They further suggested that the bust was discreetly disposed of after Caesar's assassination in 44 BC, when portraits of him could have been politically dangerous possessions.

The story of the discovery was carried by many major media outlets. British classicist and historian Mary Beard objected that there was no basis for identifying the bust as Caesar, and accused those involved in the discovery of staging a publicity stunt. Other historians also disputed the identification, including Paul Zanker, an archaeologist and expert on Caesar and Augustus. Many noted the lack of resemblances to Caesar's likenesses issued on coins during the last years of the dictator's life, and to the "Tusculum bust" of Caesar, which is accepted as a depiction of Caesar from his lifetime, based on its similarity to the coin portraits.

After a further stylistic assessment Zanker dated the Arles bust to the Augustan period. Elkins pointed out the 3rd century AD as the outside terminus post quem for the deposition of the statues, thereby disputing the claim that the bust was thrown away due to feared repercussions from Caesar's assassination in 44 BC.

Controversy about the identity of the bust is ongoing among French archeologists.

Depictions
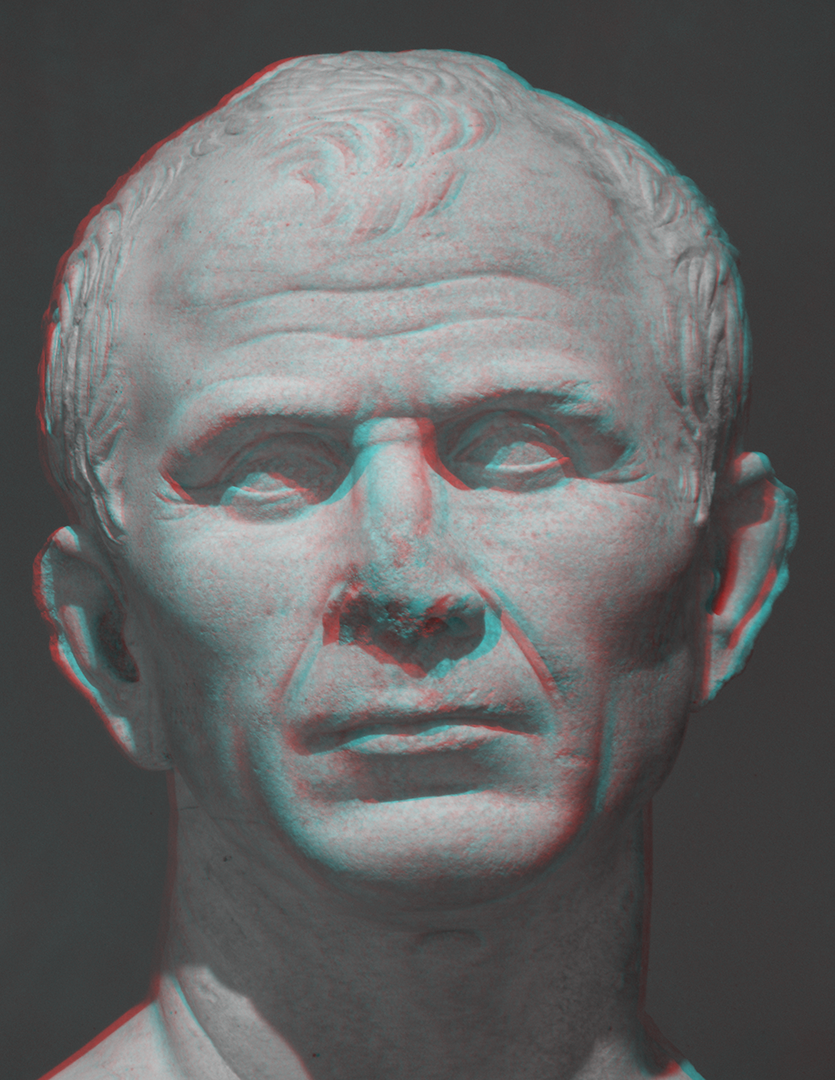
3D anaglyph of the marble bust found in the Rhone River near Arles

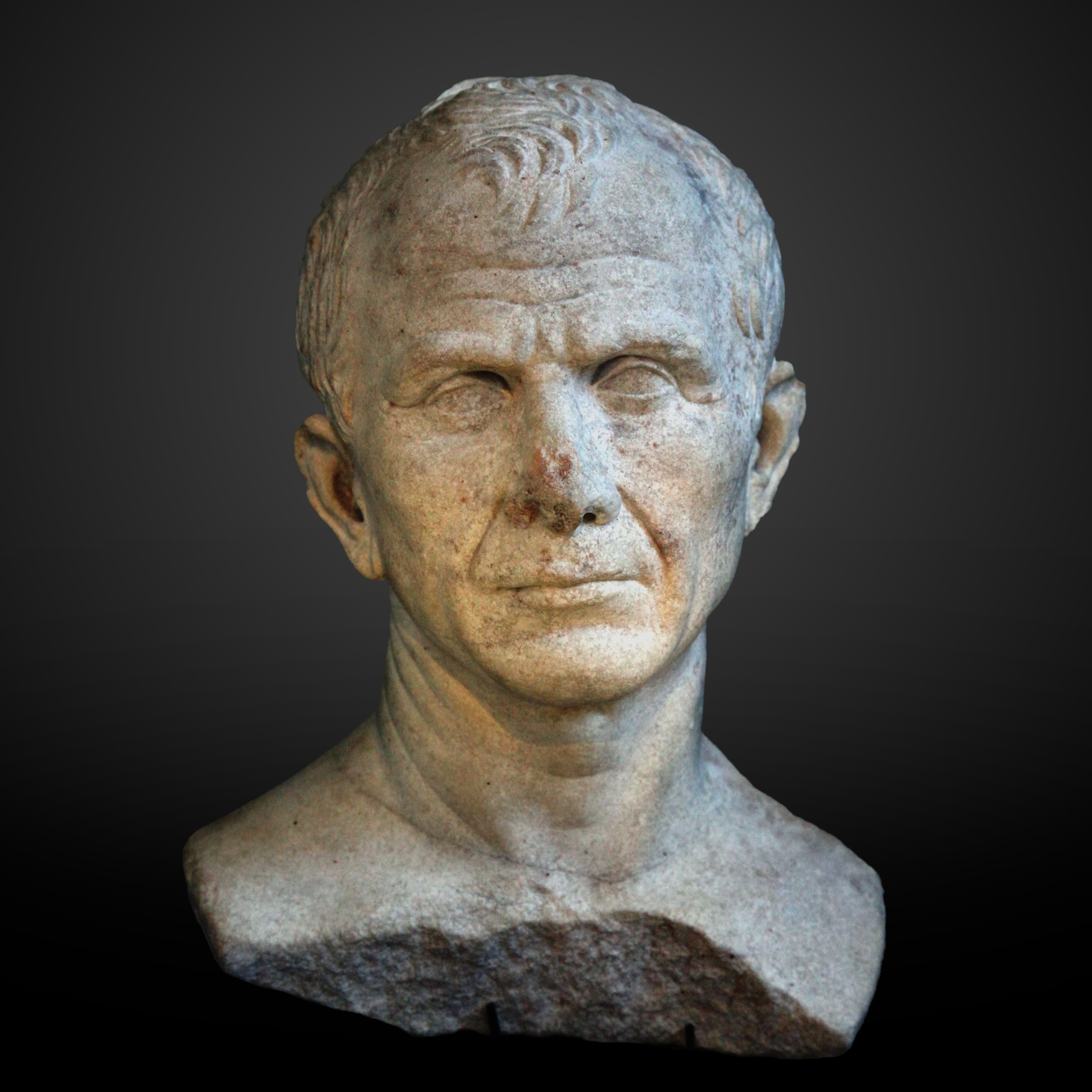

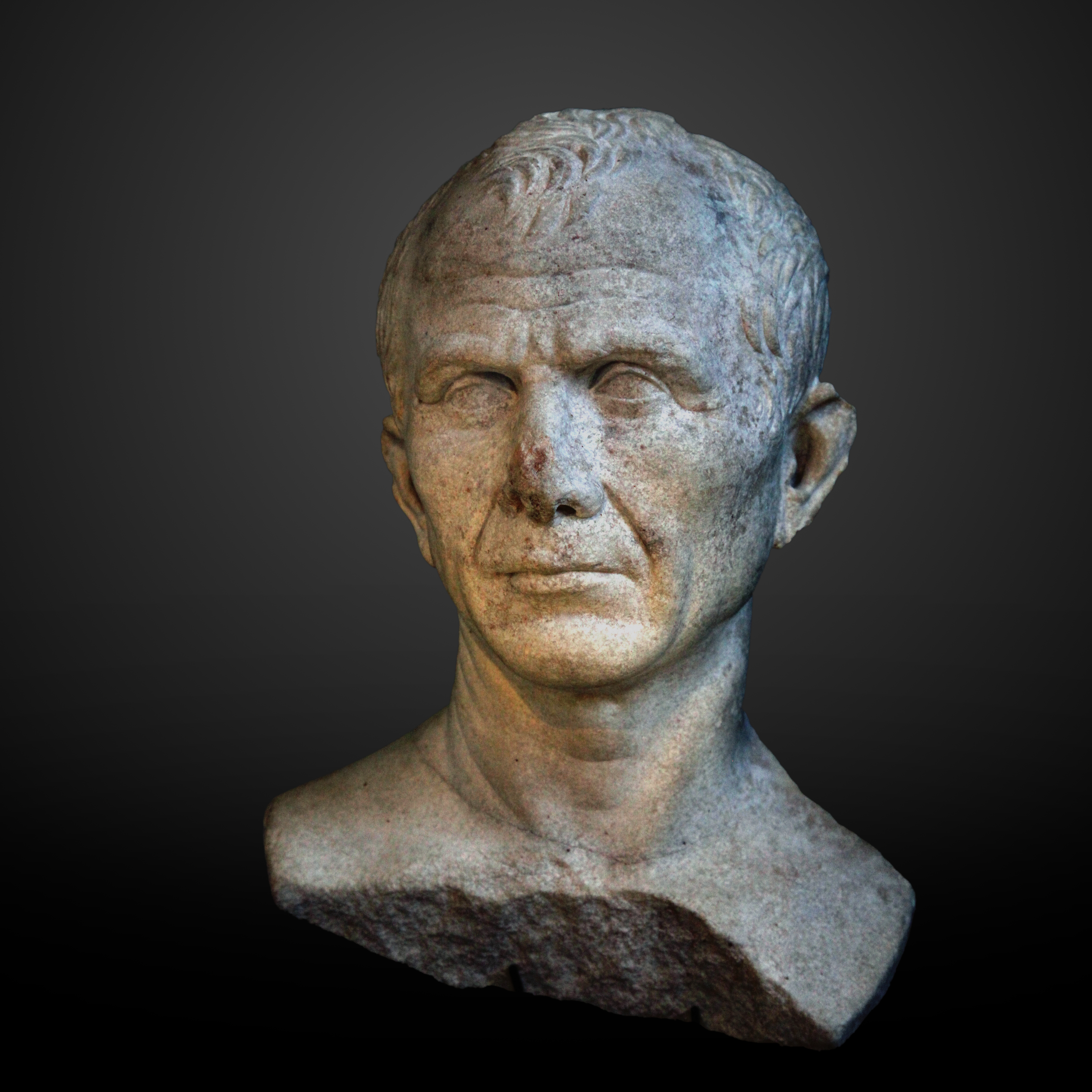

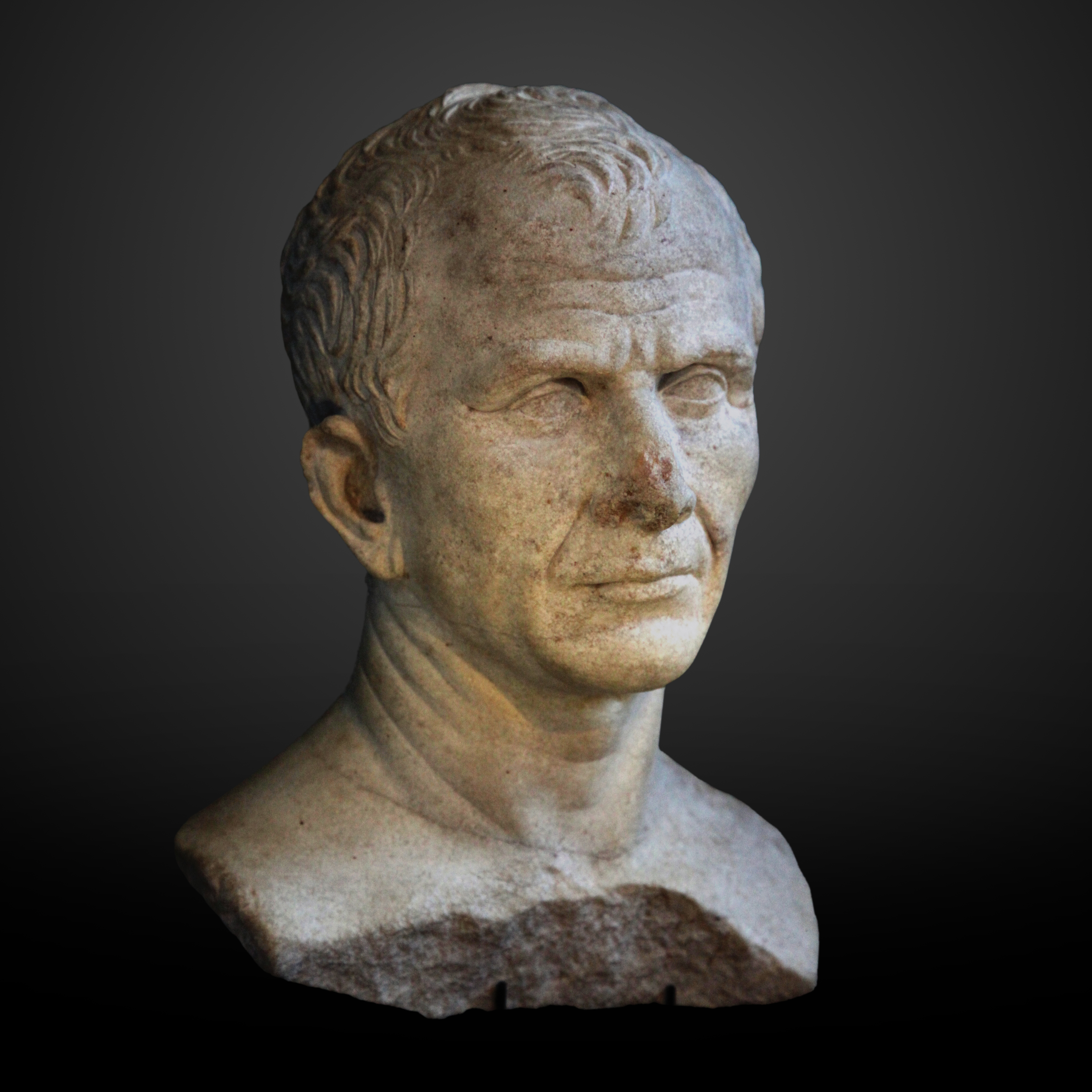

== See also ==
- Chiaramonti Caesar
- Green Caesar
