= The Assassination of Julius Caesar (Sullivan) =

1888 painting by William Holmes Sullivan

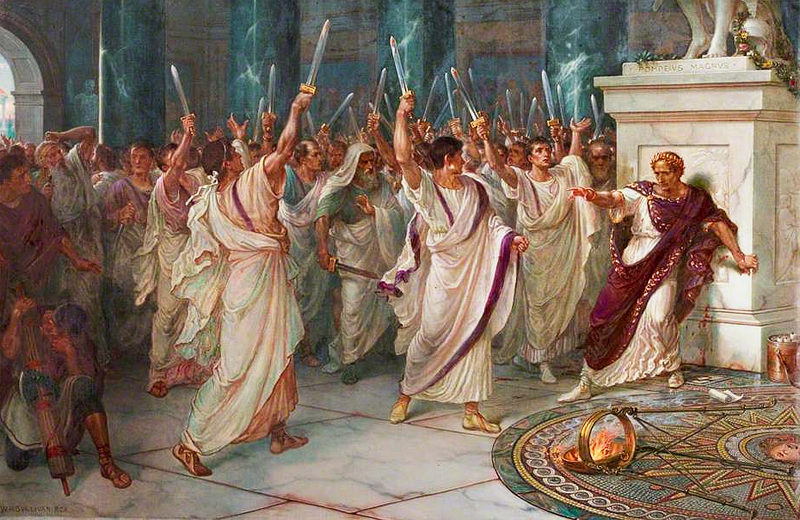
- Artist: William Holmes Sullivan
- Year: 1888
- Medium: oil on canvas
- Dimensions: 58.4 cm × 89 cm (23.0 in × 35 in)
- Location: Royal Shakespeare Theatre, Stratford-upon-Avon

The Assassination of Julius Caesar is an 1888 painting by William Holmes Sullivan which depicts the assassination of Julius Caesar at the hands of his fellow senators. The painting, like Sullivan's other works, is based on Shakespare's play the Tragedy of Julius Caesar, depicts the Act III, Scene 1, and is placed in the Royal Shakespeare Theatre. A similar version by Sullivan is named Et tu Brute, after the well-known quotation from the scene.

== See also ==
- Cultural depictions of Julius Caesar
