= Green Caesar =

Portrait of Julius Caesar

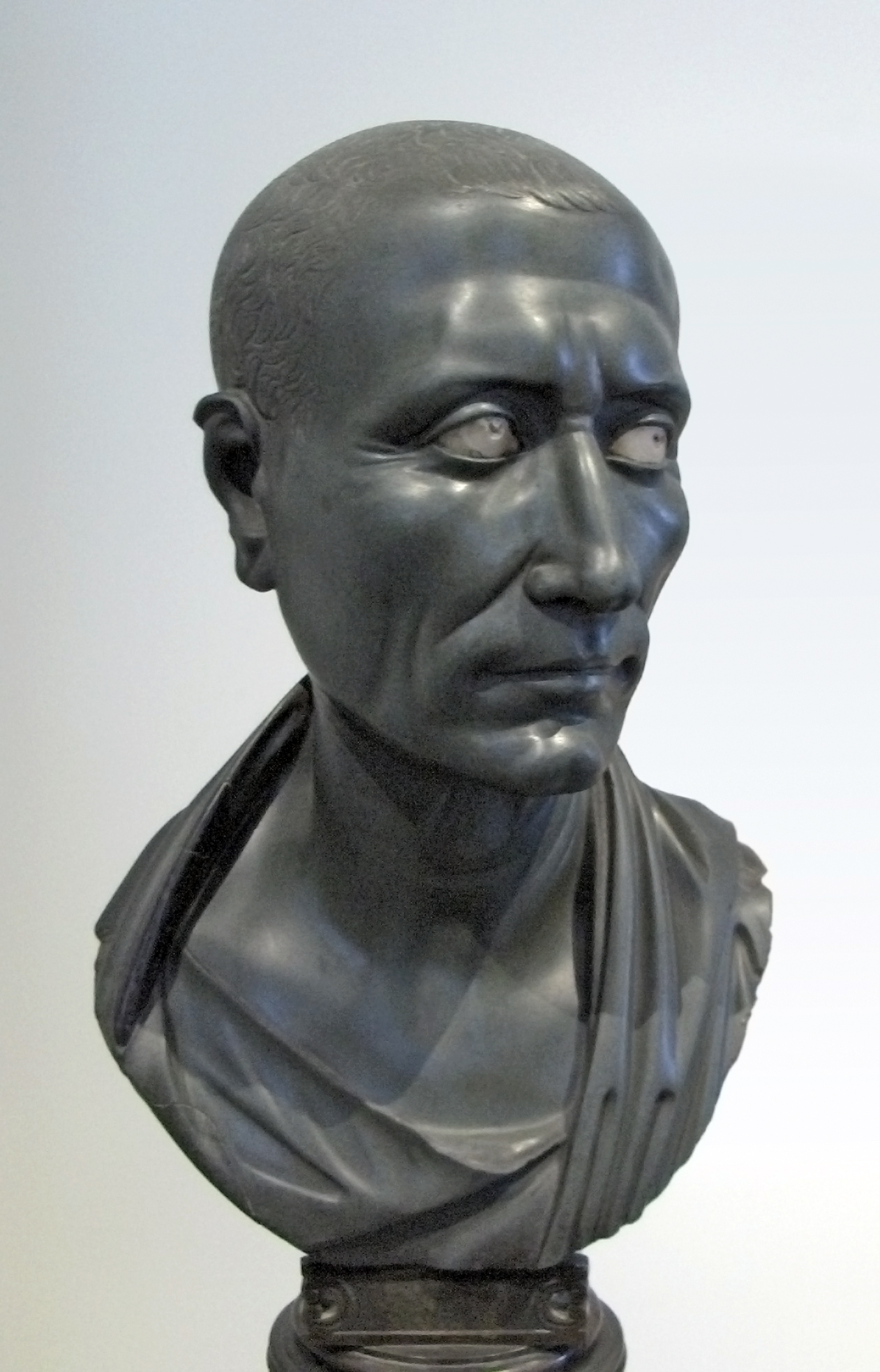
- The Berlin Green Caesar
- Year: First century BC – first century AD
- Catalogue: Sk 342
- Medium: Green greywacke
- Subject: Julius Caesar
- Dimensions: 41 cm × 26 cm × 25 cm (16 in × 10 in × 9.8 in)
- Location: Antikensammlung Berlin, Berlin

The Green Caesar is a portrait of Julius Caesar made of green Egyptian greywacke, kept in the Antikensammlung Berlin, which was likely made in the first century AD.

== Description ==
The portrait is 41 centimetres high and therefore a little over life size. It is made of a hard, dark green stone quarried in Wadi Hammamat in Upper Egypt, known as bekhen-stone in Egyptian documents and variously described as greywacke, basanite, or slate in modern sources. Signs of old age, like the receding hairline, lines on the forehead and nose, lightly wrinkled cheeks, deep nasolabial folds and crow's feet around the eyes. Lines on the neck result from the incline of the head to the right hand side. The face is long, narrow and angular with marked cheekbones, a high forehead and a strong chin. The long, straight nose, the slight Adam's apple and the narrow-lipped mouth contribute to a lean, even emaciated appearance. The short, curled hair is combed forward from the back, but is merely engraved on the sculpture, not depicted in three dimensions. This increases the sparse appearance of the hair and head. The bust is largely intact, but there are small modern restorations to the seam of the tunic and toga on the right hand side. A gap in the right ear was also repaired at first, but is now once more in a fragmentary condition. The marble inlays in the eyes are modern, as is the podium.

== Style ==
There is widespread agreement that the individual depicted by the bust is the Roman politician Gaius Julius Caesar, who was one of the most significant figures in the end of the Roman Republic in the first century BC. The only known portraits of him that derive from his lifetime are those on his coins, which are barely idealised and depict him with clearly unique features. They stand entirely in the Republican tradition. All known sculptural portraits were created only after his death. The Green Caesar belongs to a group of late Republican portraits which appear very individualised to the modern viewer, but actually just reproduce various idealised features. These depictions represent values and qualities which were expected of the statesman, using typological forms and normalised formulae. Thus, the signs of old age indicate authority (auctoritas), while the gaze and expression show dignity and strictness (gravitas and severitas) and the tilt of the head shows dynamism and vigour. The viewer sees a serious and dignified man who is fully aware of his position and the duties that go with it, but also of his entitlement to it. The ascetic, sober style imitates the sobriety and endurance of a successful general, even though the clothing is that of a statesman rather than a general.

The style of the bust suggests a date in the late Republican or early Imperial period (late first century BC to the early first century AD). Some scholars have argued that the way the toga is worn on the bust favors a date in the 1st century AD, while others have explicitly rejected this detail as a useful criterion for dating.

== Provenance ==
Because of the material used, it seems likely that the bust was produced in Egypt, but nothing more is known of its history in antiquity. It was acquired by Frederick II of Prussia in 1767 from the collection of Jean de Jullienne in Paris, and together with other antiquities in the royal possession it was transferred to the Antikensammlung Berlin in 1830. There the portrait has been displayed since 2010 in the Altes Museum, immediately next to a portrait of Cleopatra.

== Bibliography ==
- Dagmar Grassinger: "„Grüner Caesar“." In Staatliche Museen zu Berlin. Die Antikensammlung. Altes Museum. Pergamonmuseum. Philipp von Zabern, Mainz 2007, ISBN 978-3-8053-2449-6, pp. 120–121.
- Michael Siebler: Römische Kunst. Taschen, Köln 2007, ISBN 978-3-8228-5451-8, pp. 36–37.
