= Julius Caesar (Andrea Ferrucci) =

16th c. bust by Andrea Ferrucci

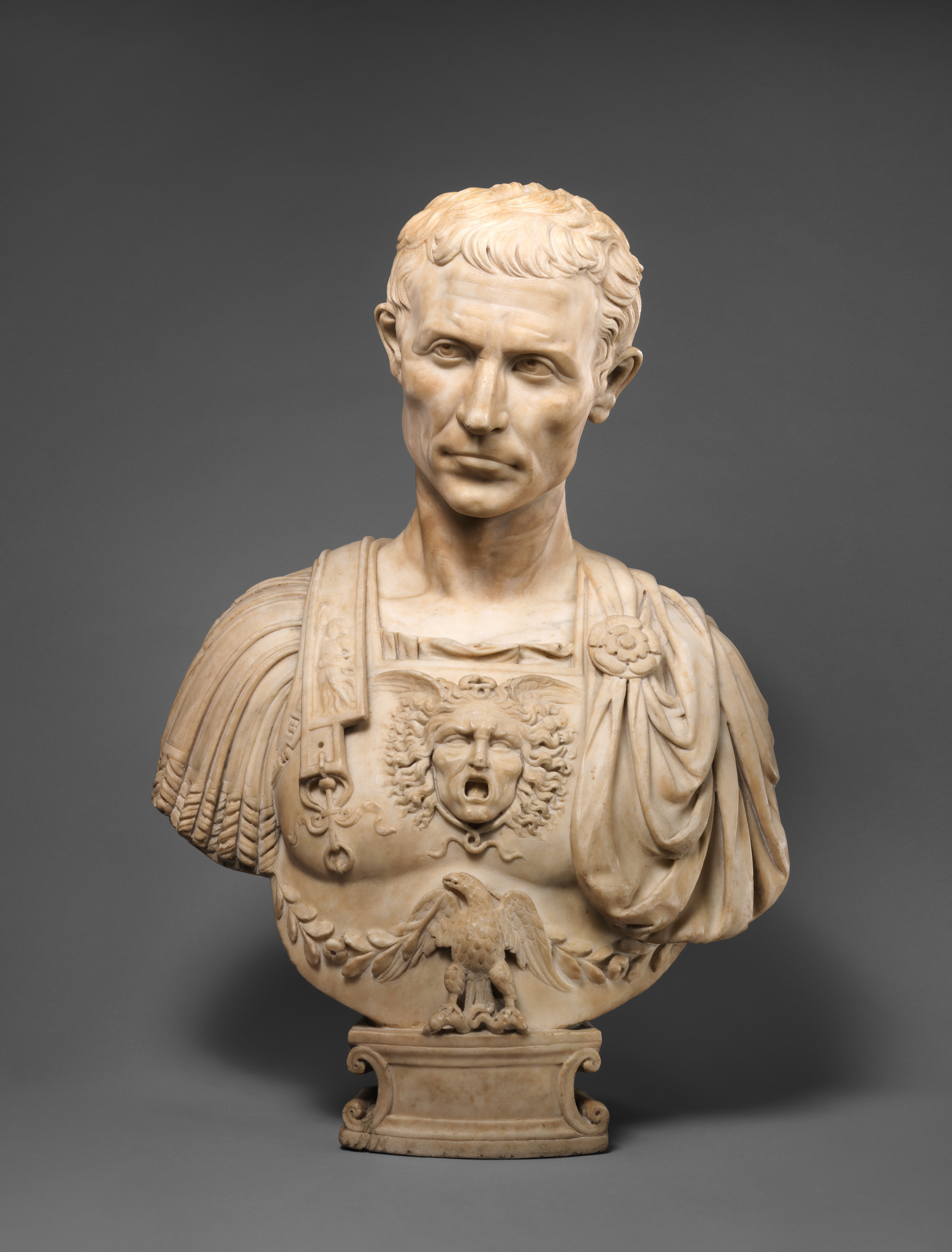
Julius Caesar by Andrea Ferrucci.

Julius Caesar is the name of a bust by 16th century artist Andrea Ferrucci depicting Roman dictator Julius Caesar. The sculpture is a Chiaramonti-Pisa type style bust of Caesar inspired by the Chiaramonti Caesar portrait.

== History ==
The bust was made between 1512 and 1514. It is now located at the Metropolitan Museum of Art in New York City.

== Description ==
The bust portrays Caesar at about the age of 45 to 50, showing some wrinkles, but still vigorous with a thin, broad forehead, direct eyes, Roman nose, smallish jawline with a slightly prominent chin and a long neck, wearing a breastplate with a screaming Medusa and a Roman eagle.

== Analysis ==
The bust is often compared to Michelangelo's Brutus in style and character.

== See also ==
- Cultural depictions of Julius Caesar
