= Michael Siebler =

German journalist and classical archaeologist

Michael Siebler (born 1956) is a German journalist and classical archaeologist.

Siebler studied classical archaeology. While he was still studying he took part in various excavations, including those at Olympia. A DAAD stipend enabled him to take up a residence in Athens. In 1984 he received his doctorate from the University of Mainz for Studien zum augusteischen Mars Ultor (Studies on the Augustan Mars Ultor). After that he spent a period in a position at the Deutsches Archäologisches Institut in Damascus. A position as a member of the Mainz University Archaeological institute followed.

From 1986, Siebler was an editor of the literary supplement of the Frankfurter Allgemeine Zeitung. In this role he looked after archaeological matters and the page on the art market. A key focus of his published work is research on Homer, Troy and Heinrich Schliemann. As FAZ editor he helped spread the findings of Manfred Korfmann, but in the end he did not endorse Korfmann's position in the Troy Controversy. After he left FAZ, he was employed by the pharmaceutical company Boehringer Ingelheim, where he managed the historical archive.

== Selected writings ==
- Studien zum augusteischen Mars Ultor (Studies in the Augustan Mars Ultor), Maris, München 1988 ISBN 3-925801-01-4 (Münchener Arbeiten zur Kunstgeschichte und Archäologie, Vol. 1)
- Troia – Homer – Schliemann. Mythos und Wahrheit (Troy – Homer – Schliemann. Myth and Reality), von Zabern, Mainz 1990 (Kulturgeschichte der antiken Welt, Vol. 46) ISBN 3-8053-1123-0
- Troia. Geschichte – Grabungen – Kontroversen (Troy. History – Excavations – Controversies), von Zabern, Mainz 1994 (Zaberns Bildbände zur Archäologie, Vol 17/Supplements of Antiken Welt) ISBN 3-8053-1626-7
  - Troia – Mythos und Wirklichkeit. (Troy – Myth and Probability). Philipp Reclam jun., Stuttgart 2001, (Universal-Bibliothek 18130), ISBN 3-15-018130-5
- Olympia. Ort der Spiele, Ort der Götter. (Olympia. Place of the Games, place of the Gods). Klett-Cotta Verlag, Stuttgart 2004, ISBN 3608960066
- Griechische Kunst, Taschen, Köln u.a. 2007 ISBN 978-3-8228-5447-1
  - English: Greek Art, Taschen, Köln u.a. 2007 ISBN 978-3-8228-5450-1
- Römische Kunst (Roman Art), Taschen, Köln u.a. 2007 ISBN 978-3-8228-5451-8
