= Chiaramonti Caesar =

Bust of Julius Caesar

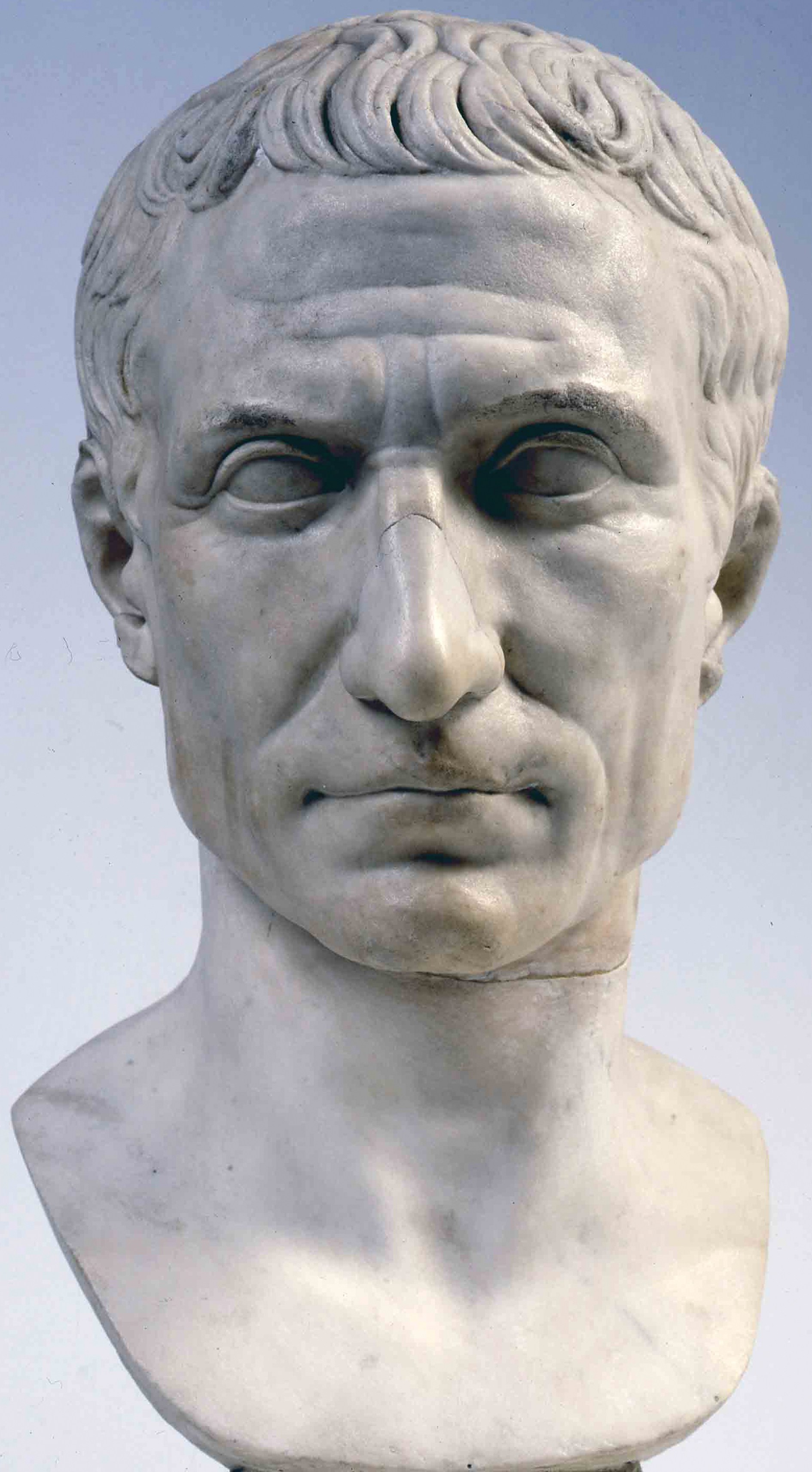
The Chiaramonti Caesar

The Chiaramonti Caesar is one of the two accepted portraits of Julius Caesar from before the age of the Roman Empire, alongside the Tusculum portrait. The bust has influenced the iconography of Caesar and given the name to the Chiaramonti-Pisa type, one of the two main types of facial portraits that can be seen of Caesar in modern days.

The bust is part of the collection of the Vatican Museums.

== See also ==
- Cultural depictions of Julius Caesar
- Julius Caesar (Andrea Ferrucci), an Italian Renaissance bust modeled on the Chiaramonti Caesar
- Arles bust, possible third lifelike Caesar portrait
