= William Holmes Sullivan =

British painter (1836–1908)

- Born: 1836
- Died: 1908 (aged 71–72)
- Known for: History painting, portrait painting

William Holmes Sullivan (1836–1908) was a British painter known for his history paintings, portraits, and war scenes. His works include a number of paintings based on William Shakespeare's tragedy, Julius Caesar.

== Gallery ==
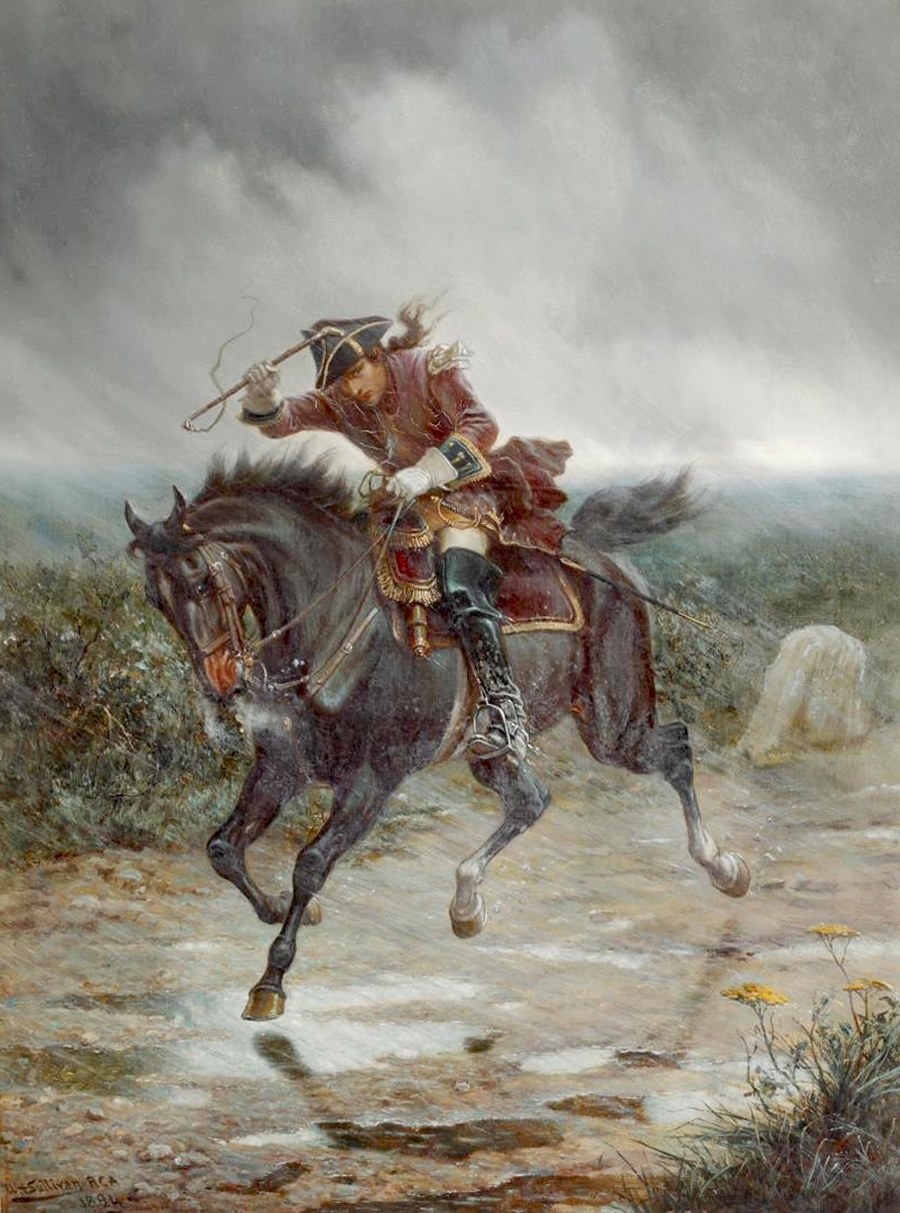
A Doubtful Path (1894)

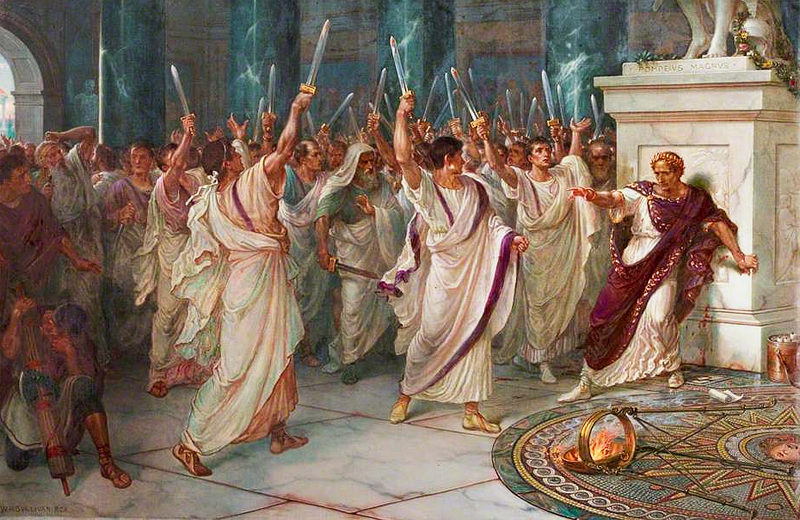
The Assassination of Julius Caesar (c. 1888)

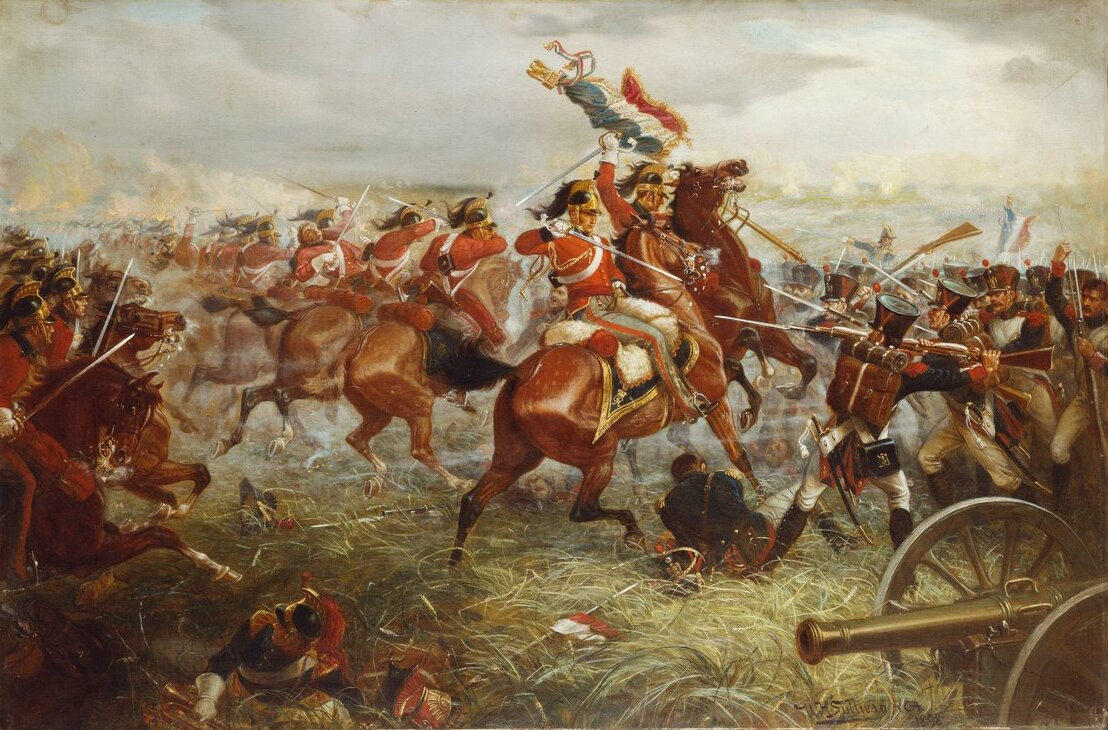
Capture of the Eagle (1898)
