= Young Caesar (opera) =

Opera by Lou Harrison

Young Caesar is an opera written in 1970 by Lou Harrison which depicts the younger years of Roman dictator Julius Caesar, such as his relationship with his first fiancée Cossutia and his flight from Rome to escape the wrath of Dictator Sulla, but it focuses most of all on Caesar's sexual relationship with the Bithynian king Nicomedes IV of Bithynia.

Harrison originally designed it as a puppet opera. New versions were commissioned in 1987 (performed in 1988) by the Portland Gay Men's Chorus and then by the Lincoln Center Festival in 1997. Due to disagreements with the changes, the latter version was never performed at New York City Opera as originally planned, but premiered in San Francisco in 2007 by Opera Parallèle after Harrison's death in 2003. In 2017 Yuval Sharon reworked the opera for the Los Angeles Philharmonic performed at Walt Disney Concert Hall.

Instead of focusing on homosexuality in a negative light, Harrison focused on the celebration of life that results from embracing who you are.

== See also ==
- Young Caesar (novel)

== Notes ==
1. For the purposes of the opera, Caesar is called Gaius.
