= Die Ermordung Cäsars =

Opera by Giselher Klebe

- Opera by Giselher Klebe
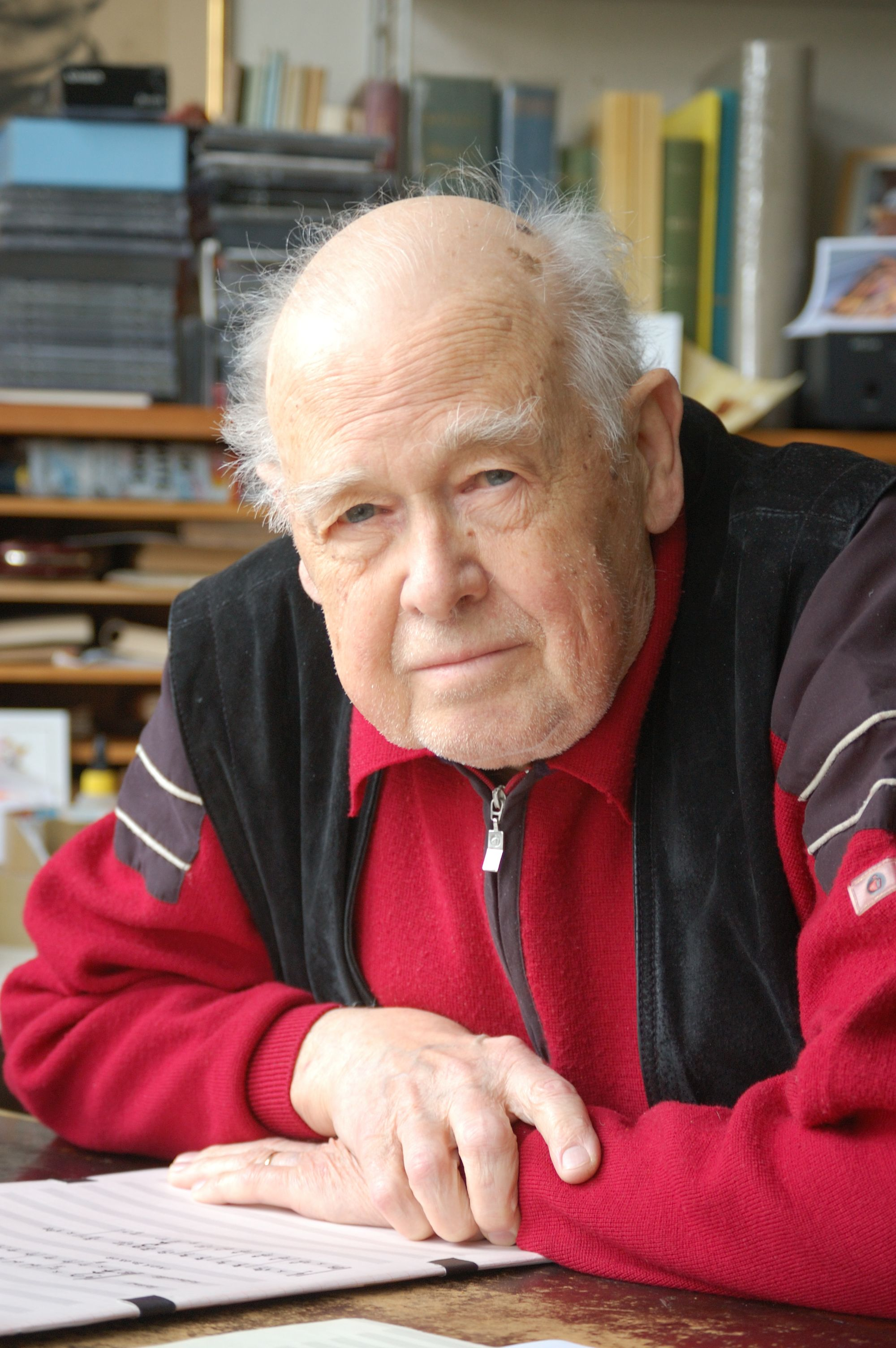
- The composer in 2008
- Translation: The Murder of Caesar
- Librettist: Klebe
- Language: German
- Based on: Julius Caesar by Shakespeare
- Premiere: 20 September 1959; Grillo-Theater, Essen

Die Ermordung Cäsars (The Murder of Caesar), Op. 32, is an opera in one act by Giselher Klebe who also wrote the libretto based on the translation by August Wilhelm von Schlegel of Shakespeare's play Julius Caesar.

It premiered on 20 September 1959 at the Grillo-Theater, Essen, with Gustav König conducting. It is dedicated to the German composer Wilhelm Maler. The opera is scored for piccolo flute; soprano, alto, tenor and baritone saxophones; contrabassoon; bass trumpet; tenor tuba; timpani; piano; cellos; double basses; several tapes. A performance takes about 50 minutes.

== Roles ==
- Caesar (baritone)
- Mark Antony (baritone)
- Publius and Popilius Lena, senators (sprechgesang, spoken role)
- Conspirators against Caesar:
  - Brutus (bariton)
  - Cassius (tenor buffo)
  - Casca (bass)
  - Decius (spoken role)
  - Metellus Cimber (spoken role)
- A soothsayer (bass)
- Cinna, a poet (tenor)
- People of Rome

Time and Place: Ancient Rome, 15 March 44 BC (Ides of March)
