= Andrea Ferrucci =

Italian sculptor (1465–1526)

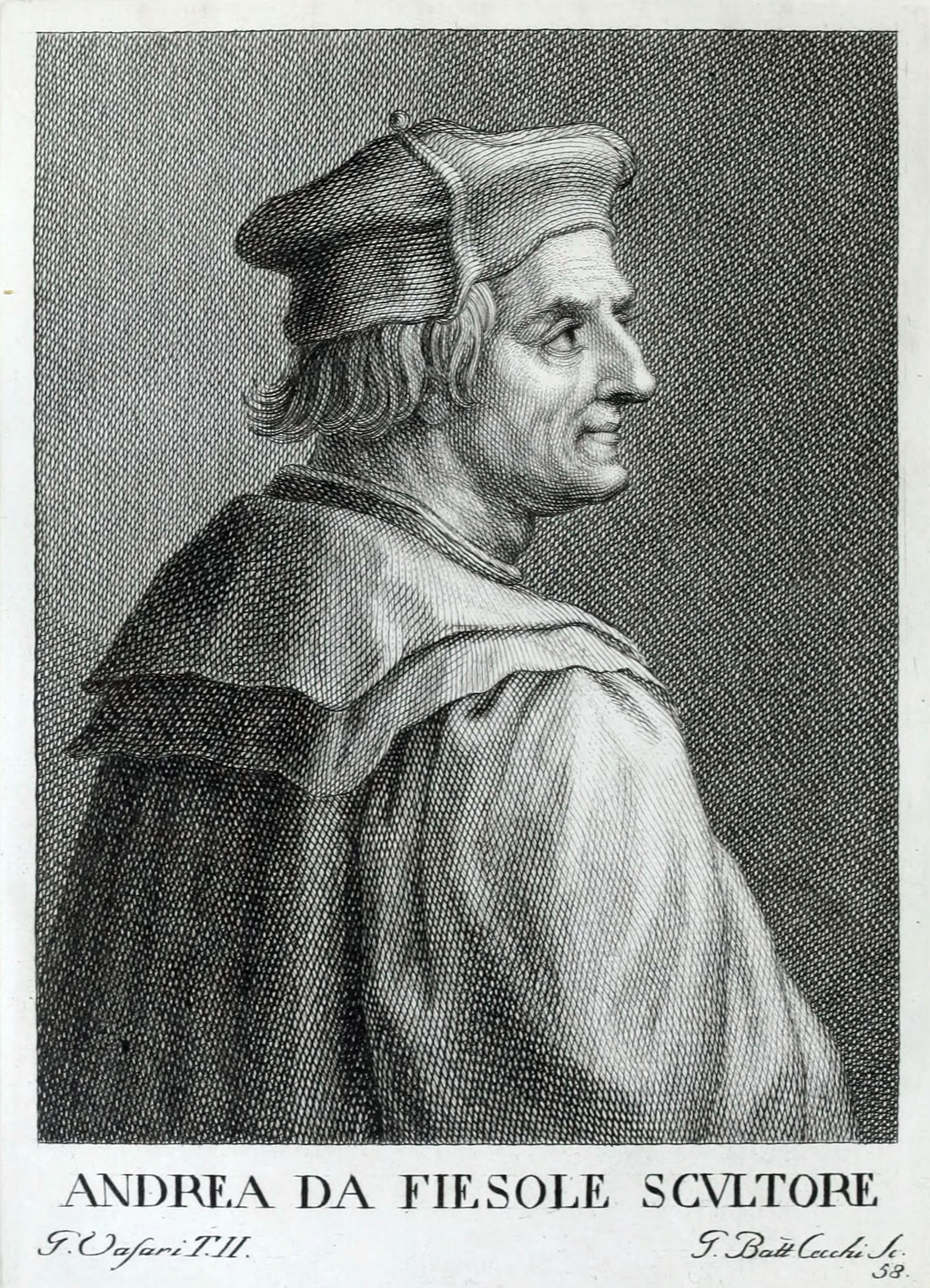
Andrea Ferrucci

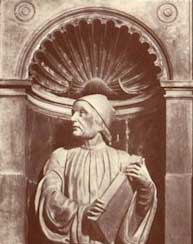
Bust of Marsilio Ficino by Andrea Ferrucci, in the Duomo of Florence

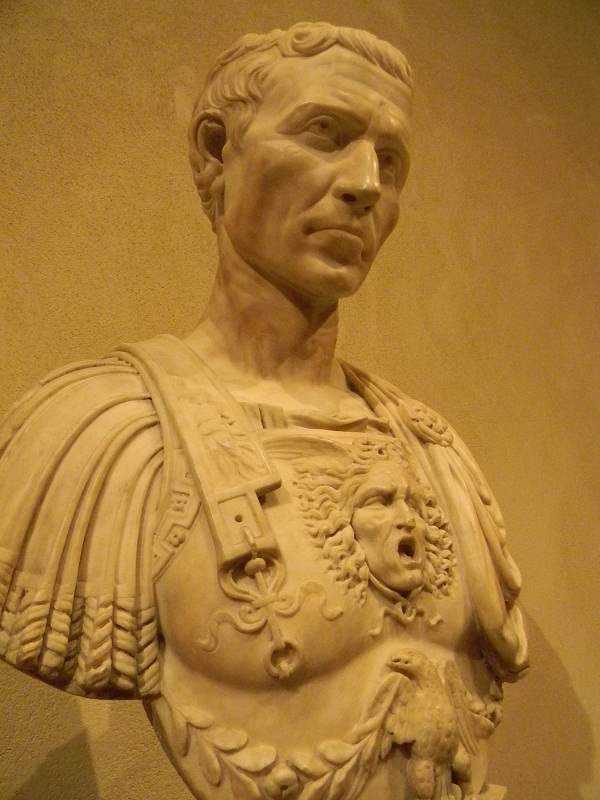
Andrea di Pietro di marco Ferrucci, Italian, 1465–1526, Julius Caesar, Metropolitan Museum of Art

Andrea Ferrucci (1465–1526), also known as Andrea di Piero Ferruzzi and as Andrea da Fiesole, was an Italian sculptor who was born in Fiesole, Tuscany, in 1465. He was a first cousin once removed of the artist Francesco di Simone Ferrucci (1437–1493), under whom he studied.

According to Vasari's Lives of the Most Excellent Painters, Sculptors, and Architects, Andrea Ferrucci was also a student of Michele Maini, also from Fiesole. He was working for King Ferdinand I of Naples in 1487 and married the daughter of Antonio di Giorgio Marchesi (1451–1522) the King’s architect and military engineer. From 1512 to 1518, he superintended the work on the Duomo of Florence, for which he himself executed a statue of Saint Andrew. In 1519, for Archbishop Tamás Bakócz (†1521) he provided the design for the marble altar for the Bakócz chapel at Esztergom, which is the earliest and most significant surviving Renaissance building in Hungary. His half-length bust of Marsilio Ficino (illustration) adorns Santa Maria del Fiore, the Duomo of Florence.

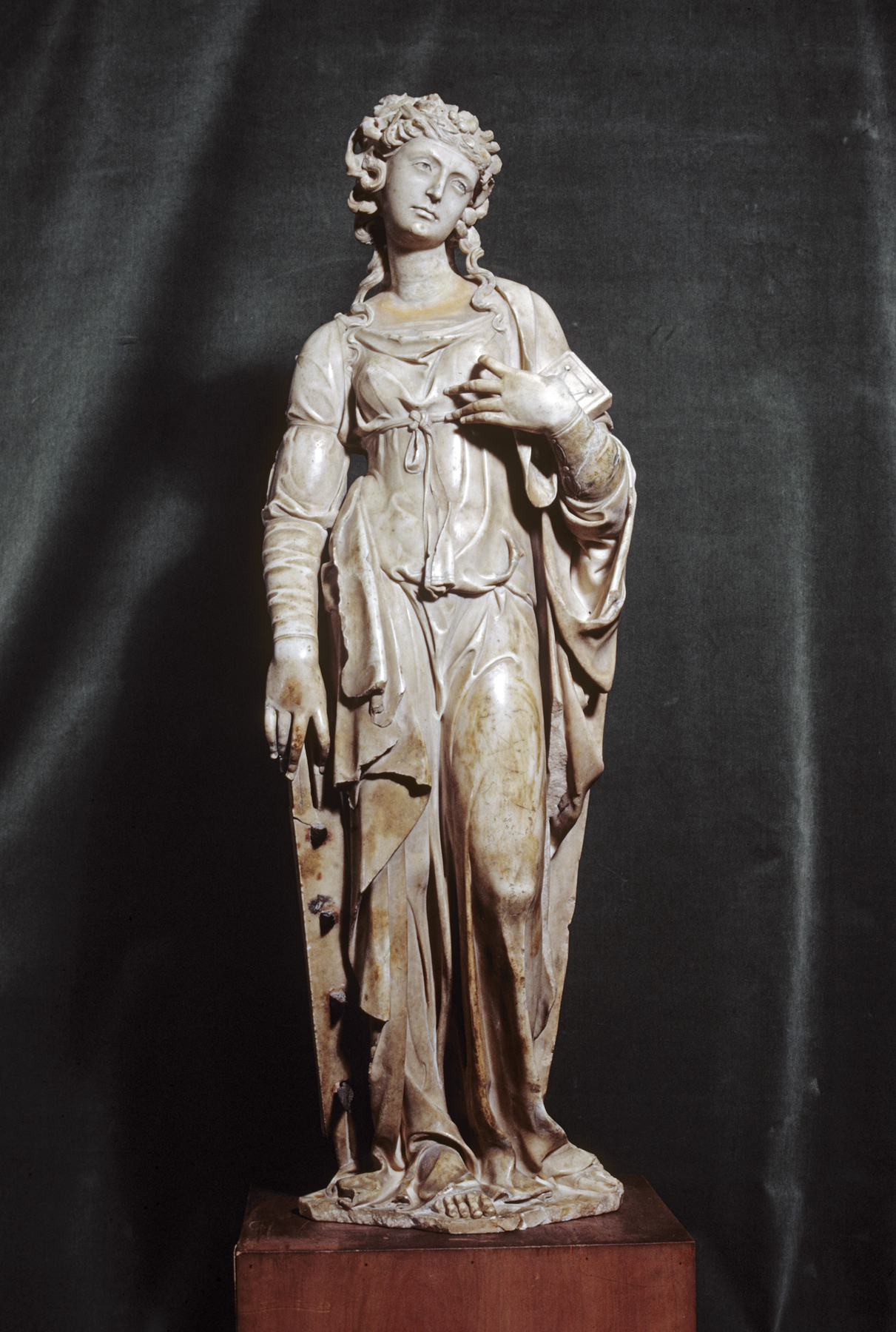
Saint Catherine of Alexandria, made for an architectural niche, c. 1515 (Walters Art Museum)

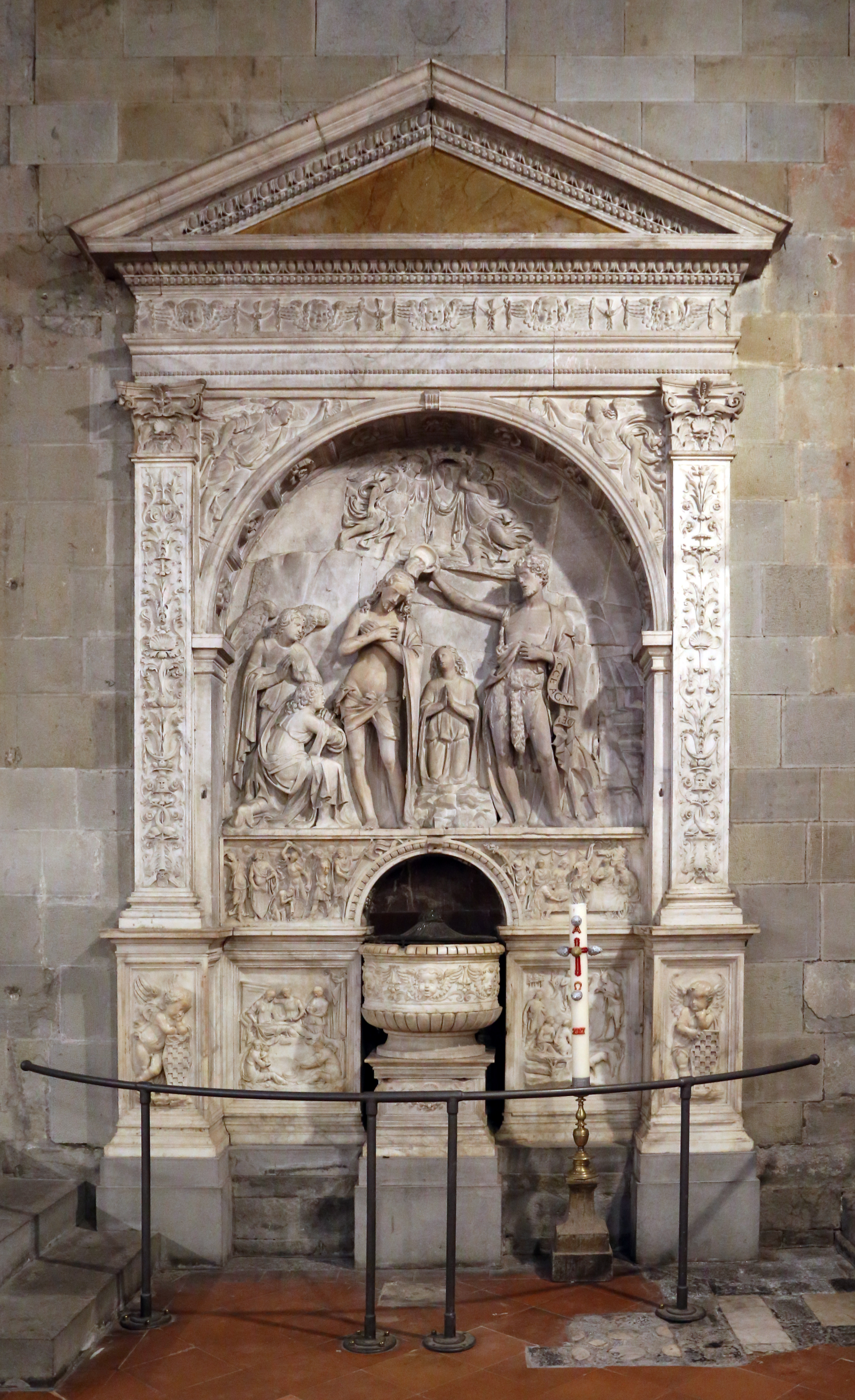
Baptismal font, Pistoia Cathedral

Among his masterworks is the bas-reliefs surrounding the baptismal font at the Duomo of Pistoia. The marble reliefs depict scenes from the life of St John the Baptist and are contained in panels inside a temple front-like niche.

Fiesole cathedral possesses a marble reredos from his hand, and the Bargello, Florence, has a Holy Family. Other works of Ferrucci are the tombs of the two Saliceti in San Martino Maggiore (1403) and San Domenico (1412), Bologna, decorations in San Martino, Naples, and the Strozzi tomb in Santa Maria Novella, Florence, begun by him and finished by Casini and Boscoli.

Andrea Ferrucci was the teacher of Silvio Cosini and Giovanni Mangone. He died in Florence in 1526.
