= Rex Warner =

English classicist, writer, and translator (1905–1986)

Reginald "Rex" Ernest Warner (9 March 1905 – 24 June 1986) was an English classicist, writer, and translator who is best remembered for The Aerodrome (1941). Warner was described by V. S. Pritchett as "the only outstanding novelist of ideas whom the decade of ideas produced".

== Early life and education ==
Warner was born in Birmingham, England, and brought up mainly in Gloucestershire, the son of the Frederic Ernest Warner, vicar of Amberley, and his wife Kathleen Luce, daughter of John James Luce. He was educated at St. George's School in Harpenden and at Wadham College, Oxford, where he associated with W. H. Auden, Cecil Day-Lewis, and Stephen Spender, and published in Oxford Poetry. He obtained a 1st in Classical Moderations in 1925 and later graduated with a 3rd in English in 1928.

== Career ==
After his graduation, Warner spent time teaching, some of it in Egypt. Warner's debut story, "Holiday", appeared in the New Statesman in 1930. His first collection, Poems, appeared in 1937. His poem, "Arms in Spain", a satire on Nazi Germany and Fascist Italy's support for Francoist Spain and the Nationalist faction in the Spanish Civil War, has often been reprinted. He was also a contributor to Left Review. Warner was a great admirer of Franz Kafka and his fiction was "profoundly influenced" by Kafka's work. Warner's first three novels all reflect his anti-fascist beliefs; The Wild Goose Chase is in part a dystopian fantasy about the overthrow of a tyrannical government in a heroic revolution. His second novel, The Professor, published around the time of the Nazi Anschluss, is the story of a liberal academic whose compromises with a repressive government lead eventually to his arrest, imprisonment, and murder "while attempting to escape". Contemporary reviewers saw parallels with the Austrian leaders Engelbert Dollfuss and Kurt Schuschnigg.

Although Warner was initially sympathetic to the Soviet Union, "the Molotov–Ribbentrop Pact left him disillusioned with Communism". The Aerodrome is an allegorical novel whose young hero is faced with the disintegration of his certainties about his loved ones, and with a choice between the earthy animalistic life of his home village and the pure, efficient, and emotionally detached life of an airman. The Times described The Aerodrome as Warner's "most perfectly accomplished novel". Why Was I Killed? (1943) is an afterlife fantasy with an anti-war theme.

Warner then abandoned contemporary allegory in favour of historical novels about Ancient Greece and Rome, including Imperial Caesar, for which he was awarded the 1960 James Tait Black Memorial Prize for fiction. Imperial Caesar was praised by John Davenport as "delightfully perceptive and funny" and by Storm Jameson as "brilliant, intelligent, continuously interesting. It has everything." The Converts, a novel about Saint Augustine and dedicated to the Greek poet and diplomat George Seferis, reflected Warner's own increasing devotion to Christianity.

Warner served in the Home Guard during the Second World War and also worked as a Latin teacher at a Grammar School in Morden as there was a shortage of teachers. From 1945 to 1947, he was in Athens as director of the British Institute. At that time, he became involved in numerous translations of classical Greek and Latin authors. His translation of Thucydides' History of the Peloponnesian War for Penguin Classics sold over a million copies. He also translated Poems of George Seferis (1960). Warner's time in Greece coincided with the early stages of the Greek Civil War, which ended with the Greek Communists defeated and suppressed. This formed the background to his book Men of Stones: A Melodrama (1949), depicting imprisoned leftists presenting King Lear in their prison camp. In 1961, Warner was appointed Tallman Professor of Classics at Bowdoin College. From 1962 to 1973, he was a professor at the University of Connecticut. While he was in the United States, he was interviewed for the book Authors Take Sides on Vietnam (1967) and argued for withdrawal from Indochina.

== Personal life ==
Warner retired to England in 1973 and died in Wallingford, Oxfordshire, in 1986. He was married three times but to two women. His first marriage was to Frances Chamier Grove in 1929. Their marriage ended in divorce and in 1949 Warner married Barbara, Lady Rothschild, formerly the wife of Baron Victor Rothschild. Warner and his wife Frances had three children. He had further children including a daughter Anne, who wrote about the relationship between Warner and her mother (when he was not married) in the book The Blind Horse of Corfu. After his second divorce, he remarried his first wife in 1966.

== Works ==
=== Novels ===
- The Wild Goose Chase (1937)
- The Professor (1938)
- The Aerodrome (1941)
- Why Was I Killed? (1943; US title: Return of the Traveller, 1944)
- Men of Stones; A melodrama (1949)
- Escapade (1953)
- Young Caesar (1958)
- Imperial Caesar (1960)
- Pericles the Athenian (1963)
- The Converts (1967)

=== Fiction ===
- Men and Gods (1950)

=== Collections of poems ===
- Poems (1937)
- Poems and Contradictions (1945)
- New Poems 1954 (1954, with Laurie Lee and Christopher Hassall)

=== Non-fiction ===
- The Kite (1936)
- We're Not Going to Do Nothing: A Reply to Mr Aldous Huxley's Pamphlet "What Are You Going to Do About It?" (1936, with Cecil Day-Lewis)
- English Public Schools (1945)
- The Cult of Power (1946)
- John Milton (1949)
- E. M. Forster (1950, 2nd edition 1960, with John Morris)
- Greeks and Trojans (1951)
- Views of Attica (1951)
- Ashes to Ashes: A Post-Mortem on the 1940–51 Tests (1951, with Lyle Blair)
- Eternal Greece (1953) with Martin Hürlimann
- Athens (1956) with Martin Hürlimann
- The Greek Philosophers (1958)
- Look at Birds (1962)
- The Stories of the Greeks (1967)
- Athens at War (1970, a retelling of Thucydides' history of the Peloponnesian War)
- Men of Athens: The Story of Fifth-Century Athens (1972, vt. The Story of Fifth-Century Athens, with photographs by Dimitrios Harissiadis)

=== Translations from Ancient Greek ===
- Euripides, Medea (1944)
- Aeschylus, Prometheus Bound (1947)
- Xenophon, Anabasis (1949, as The Persian Expedition, 1949)
- Xenophon, Hellenica (1950, as A History of My Time)
- Thucydides, History of the Peloponnesian War (1954)
- Plutarch, Parallel Lives (1958, as Fall of the Roman Republic)
- Euripides, Helen (1958)
- Euripides, Hippolytus (1958)
- Plutarch, Moralia (as Moral Essays, 1971)

=== Translations from Latin ===
- War Commentaries of Caesar (1960, about the Gallic and Civil Wars)
- The Confessions of St. Augustine (1963)

=== Translation from Modern Greek ===
- On the Greek Style: Selected Essays in Poetry and Hellenism by George Seferis (1967, translated by Warner and T. D. Frangopoulos, with an introduction by Warner)

=== As editor ===
- The Pilgrim's Progress by John Bunyan (1951)
- Look Up at the Skies: Poems and Prose Chosen by Rex Warner (1972, a selection of verse by Gerard Manley Hopkins, illustrated by Yvonne Skargon)

=== Film and TV adaptations ===
- The Aerodrome (1983, written by Robin Chapman and directed by Giles Foster for the BBC, the cast included Peter Firth as Roy, the protagonist, Richard Briers as the Rector and Jill Bennett as Eustasia)
