= Tusculum portrait =

Roman bust, only extant portrait of Julius Caesar made during his lifetime

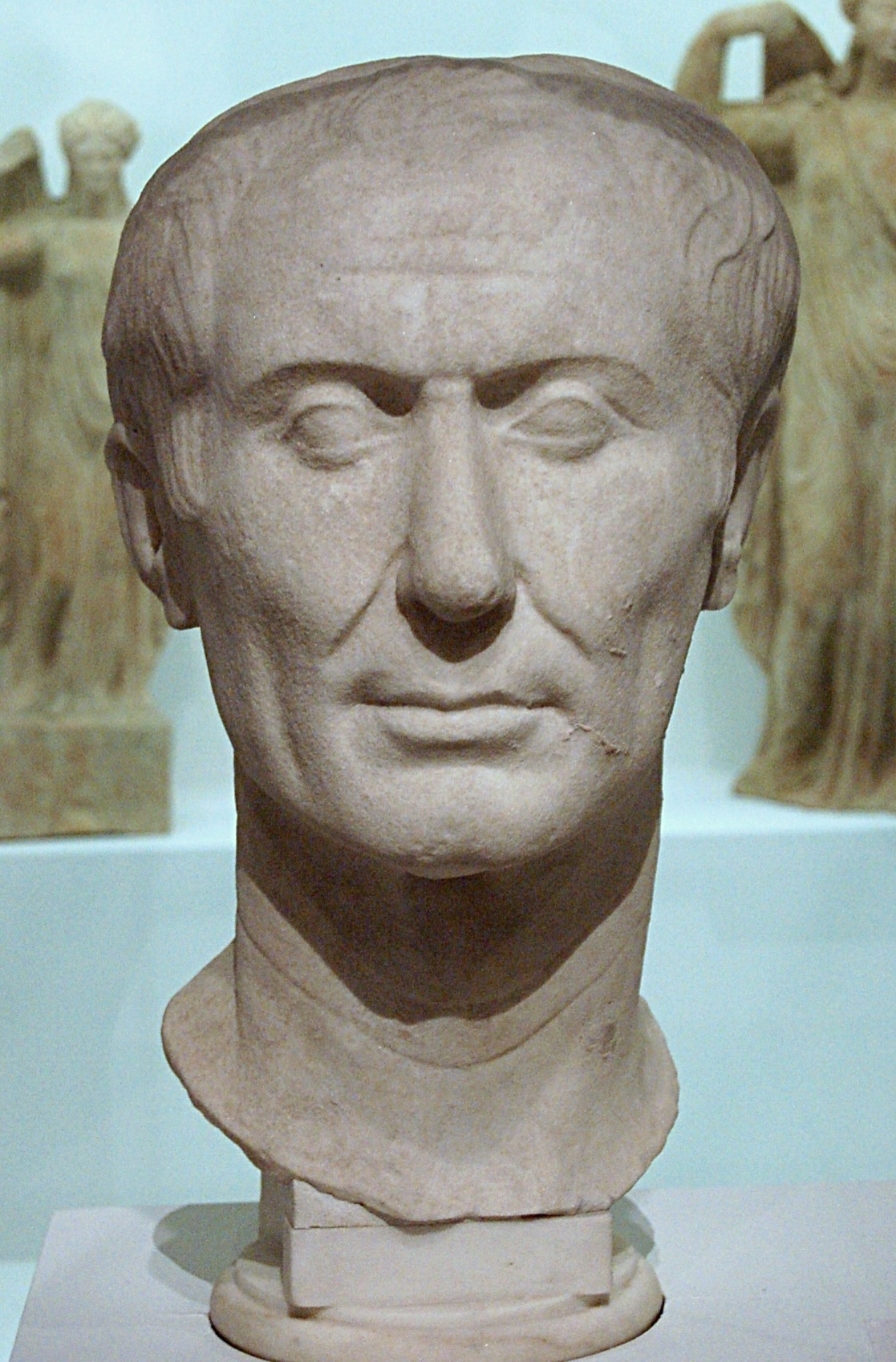
- Year: c. 46 – 44 BC
- Medium: Carrara marble
- Subject: Julius Caesar
- Dimensions: 32 cm × 21 cm (13 in × 8.3 in)
- Location: Museo di Antichità, Turin, Italy

The Tusculum portrait, also called the Tusculum bust, is believed to be the only existing sculpture of Julius Caesar made during his lifetime. It is one of the two possible portraits of Caesar (alongside the Chiaramonti Caesar) which were made before the beginning of the Roman Empire. Being one of the copies of the bronze original, the bust has been dated to 50–40 BC and is housed in the permanent collection of the Museum of Antiquities in Turin, Italy. Made of fine-grained marble, the bust measures 32 cm (1 ft 1 in) in height.

== Description ==
The portrait's facial features are consistent with those found on coins struck shortly before Caesar's assassination, particularly on the denarii issued by Marcus Mettius. The bust's head is prolonged, forming a saddle shape which could have been the result of a premature ossification of the sutures between the parietal bone and the temporal bone in Caesar's skull. The portrait also exhibits dolichocephaly, another type of cranial deformity which Caesar "may, or may not, have suffered" from, according to Mary Beard. The portrait includes a wrinkled neck, which could have been caused by years of campaigning in extreme weather conditions; this feature has been omitted from other posthumous busts, but can be seen on at least one coin issued during Caesar's lifetime. According to Jiří Frel, this feature characterizes Caesar as a general rather than a ruler, unlike later busts. The portrait's hair is present but thinning. These realistic features place the bust in the tradition of verism, as opposed to other surviving portraits which have been identified as Caesar.

== In modern day ==
The Tusculum portrait was excavated by Lucien Bonaparte at the forum in Tusculum in 1825 and was later brought to Castello d'Aglie, though it was not recognised as a bust of Caesar until Maurizio Borda identified it in 1940. There are three known copies of the Tusculum portrait, which reside in Woburn Abbey and in private collections in Florence and Rome.
