= Caesar's wife =

Caesar's wife can refer to:

== Any of the wives of Julius Caesar ==
- Cossutia (disputed)
- Cornelia
- Pompeia
- Calpurnia

== Works ==
- Caesar's Wife, a play

== Other ==
- "Caesar's wife must be above suspicion"

== See also ==
- Category:Wives of Roman emperors
