= Cossutia gens =

Ancient Roman family

The gens Cossutia was a minor plebeian family of equestrian rank of ancient Rome. Only a few members of this gens appear in history, but many others are known from epigraphy.

== Origin ==
The Cossutii were evidently not of Latin origin. Chase suggests that their name is derived from the Volscian name Cossuties. This accords with recent scholarship; based on the various cognomina borne by members of this gens, Rawson concludes that they likely originated in the highlands of central Italy. (Note: Rawson, "The Activities of the Cossutii", p. 42.) Cicero mentions the tabernae, or wine-shops of Cossutius, a merchant near Caesena in Cisalpine Gaul, perhaps indicating that the Cossutii were an Umbrian family of that area.

== Praenomina ==
The chief praenomina of the Cossutii were Gnaeus, Marcus, Gaius, Quintus, and Lucius, all of which were common throughout Roman history. A few of the Cossutii bore other common names, with several instances of Publius and Sextus known from epigraphy, and a few occurrences of Aulus, Decimus, Titus, and Servius.

== Branches and cognomina ==
Besides the architect Decimus Cossutius, other Cossutii lived throughout the Greek world during the first and second centuries BC, including at Erythrae and in Eretria, and on the islands of Delos, Ios, Kos, and Paros, the latter of which was known for its marble. These Cossuti often worked in the stone industry, in which the family was involved in various capacities until at least the second century. Coins of the Cossutii include the cognomina Maridianus and Sabula, but nothing is known of the persons bearing these surnames.

A branch of the family, possibly including Decimus Cossutius, may have been resident at Athens from the early second century BC; an inscription from the city's Kerameikos cemetery commemorates "Marcus Cossutius, son of Gaius, a Roman", rendering the name "Marcus" in Greek letters as Μαάρκος: the double-alpha spelling is most common in inscriptions from around the turn of the first century BC. (Note: Rawson, "The Activities of the Cossutii", p. 37.)

Three first-century BC statues from Italy, two depicting the god Pan from a villa at Lanuvium and one from Rome depicting a fragment of drapery, were signed by freedmen of this gens. A late first- or early second-century funerary inscription for a member of this family from Rome shows stoneworkers' tools, and two of its members are known to have been active at Chemtou in North Africa in the second century. From the late second century BC, freedmen of the gens are known to have served as magistrates in Campania, and to have lived at Puteoli; Cossutii are also attested at Pompeii, probably early in the first century AD, and in undated inscriptions in and around Campania. Other inscriptions place a freedman of the gens in Etruria and two freedmen of the gens as marble-workers. (Note: Rawson, "The Activities of the Cossutii", p. 41.)

== Members ==
This list includes abbreviated praenomina. For an explanation of this practice, see filiation.

- Decimus Cossutius, a Roman architect, was retained by Antiochus IV Epiphanes about 168 BC to rebuild the Temple of Olympian Zeus at Athens. Cossutius' reconstruction featured splendid decoration in the Corinthian style, but the temple was left unfinished after the death of Antiochus in 164. Parts of Cossutius' pillars were later removed by Sulla.
- Gaius Cossutius M. f., buried at Aquileia in Venetia and Histria, in a tomb dating from the first half of the first century BC, built by Titus Cossutius, apparently his brother.
- Titus Cossutius M. f., built a tomb at Aquileia, dating from the first half of the first century BC, for Gaius Cossutius, apparently his brother.
- Marcus Cossutius M. Ɔ. l. Antiochus, a freedman buried in a first-century BC tomb at Rome, along with his fellow freedman, Marcus Cossutius Eros. The inscription is thought to be modern.
- Marcus Cossutius M. Ɔ. l. Eros, a freedman buried in a first-century BC tomb at Rome, along with his fellow freedman, Marcus Cossutius Antiochus. The inscription is thought to be modern.
- Marcus Cossutius, an eques of Sicily, defended Xeno before Verres during the latter's administration of that province. Cicero describes him as and a man of great integrity and respectability.
- Cossutia, the fiancée and perhaps the first wife of Caesar, belonged to a very wealthy equestrian family. Caesar's parents arranged their marriage when he was but a child, but when he was sixteen, he either repudiated or divorced her in order to marry Cornelia.
- Cossutia A. l. Amata, buried at Atella in Campania, in a tomb dating from the latter half of the first century BC.
- Cossutia L. l. Chrysis, a freedwoman named along with the freedman Gaius Maruleius Eros, in an inscription from Rome dating from the latter half of the first century BC.
- Gaius Cossutius Maridianus, triumvir monetalis under Caesar in 44 BC. Rawson suggests that his branch of the family had a rural equestrian background.
- Cossutia Rufa, buried at Rome, along with Lucius Sergius Eros, in a tomb dating between the latter half of the first century BC and the first half of the first century AD.
- Quintus Cossutius P. f., one of the municipal quattuorvirs at Tarquinii in Etruria, paid for the local ludi, according to an inscription dating from the late first century BC. He was buried at Tarquinii, aged seventy-four, along with his wife, Vibia Quarta, aged fifty-six.
- Gaius Cossutius C. l. Diogenes, a freedman buried at Casilinum in Campania, in a tomb dating from the late first century BC, or the early first century AD. A freedwoman named Cossutia Phil[...] was buried in the same place.
- Cossutia C. l. Phil[...], a freedwoman buried at Casilinum, in a tomb dating from the late first century BC, or the early first century AD. The freedman Gaius Cossutius Diogenes was buried in the same place.
- Gnaeus Cossutius Niceros, named in an inscription from Rome, dating from the Julio-Claudian Dynasty.
- Marcus Cossutius C. f., buried at Athens around the beginning of the first century.
- Aulus Cossutius, a priest of Apollo Soter on Ios at some point before the middle of the first century. (Note: Rawson, "The Activities of the Cossutii", p. 38.)
- Cossutius, together with Minucia, former master and mistress of the freedwoman Primigenia, named in an inscription from Rome, dating from the first half of the first century. The inscription is thought to be modern.
- Gnaeus Cossutius, together with Quintus Cossutius, former masters of the freedwoman Fabia Prima, according to an inscription from Rome, dating from the first half of the first century.
- Quintus Cossutius, together with Gnaeus Cossutius, former masters of the freedwoman Fabia Prima, named in an early first-century inscription.
- Cossutia Tertia, buried along with Quintus Cossutius Optatus and others in an early first-century tomb at the present site of Meana di Susa.
- Cossutius, the father of Capito, according to a funerary inscription from Simitthus in Africa, dating rom the first half of the first century.
- (Cossutius) Capito, the son of Cossutius, was buried at Simitthus in a tomb dating from the first half of the first century.
- Gaius Cossutius Calidius Celer, named in an inscription from Rome, dedicated by his freedman, Cossutius Epaphroditus, dating from the first half of the first century.
- (Gaius) Cossutius Epaphroditus, the freedman of Gaius Cossutius Calidius Celer, for whom Epaphroditus dedicated an inscription at Rome, dating from the first half of the first century.
- Sextus Cossutius Euschemus, named in an inscription from Tergeste in Venetia and Histria, dating from the first half of the first century.
- Gnaeus Cossutius Faustus, buried at Rome, in a tomb dating from the first half of the first century.
- Cossutia Ɔ. l. Hilara, a freedwoman named along with the freedman Lucius Cossutius Lena, in an inscription from Rome, dating from the first half of the first century.
- Lucius Cossutius Ɔ. l. Lena, a freedman named along with the freedwoman Cossutia Hilara, in an inscription from Rome, dating from the first half of the first century.
- Cossutia Cn. l. Nymphe, a freedwoman named in an inscription from Rome, dating from the first half of the first century.
- Quintus Cossutius Optatus, buried along with Cossutia Tertia and others in a tomb located at the present site of Meana di Susa, formerly part of Alpes Cottiae, dating from the first half of the first century.
- Cossutia M. l. Tryphera, a freedwoman named in an inscription from Rome, dating from the first half of the first century.
- Cossutius, the master of Euhemerus Hilas, a young slave buried in a first-century tomb at Ostia.
- Cossutia, commissioned the freedman Phileros to build a first-century tomb at Rome for her, and for her son and freedman, Marcus Cossutius Antus.
- Quintus Cossutius Q. f., named in the sepulchral inscription of Aemilia Pia, a young woman buried in a first-century tomb at the site of modern Montopoli di Sabina, formerly part of Sabinum, aged fifteen years, six months, and two days.
- Marcus Cossutius Antus, the son and freedman of Cossutia, who had the freedman Phileros build a tomb for herself and her son.
- Gnaeus Cossutius Eros, buried in a first-century tomb at Aquileia.
- Gnaeus Cossutius Eros, buried in a first-century tomb at Formiae in Latium.
- Cossutia Q. l. Lepida, a freedwoman buried in a first-century tomb at Firmum Picenum, along with the freedman Gaius Isidius Philerotis.
- Gaius Cossutius C. f. Myrmex, one of the aediles, named in a first-century inscription from the Temple of Diana Nemorensis in Latium.
- Gaius Cossutius C. f. Primus, a boy buried in a first-century tomb at Simitthus, aged nine.
- Cossutia Cn. l. Tryphera, a freedwoman buried in a first-century tomb at Rome, dedicated by her contubernalis, Publius Attius Helius.
- Gnaeus Cossutius Agathangelus, dedicated tombs at Rome for his wife, Cossutia Arescusa, and brother, the freedman Gnaeus Cossutius Cladus, dating from the first or early second century. The inscriptions are thought to be modern.
- Cossutius Arescusa, buried at Rome, aged forty-five, in a first- or early second-century tomb built by her husband, Gnaeus Cossutius Agathangelus. The inscription is thought to be modern.
- Gnaeus Cossutius Cladus, a freedman buried at Rome, aged thirty-five, in a tomb dating from the first or early second century, built by his brother, Gnaeus Cossutius Agathangelus. The inscription is thought to be modern.
- Cossutia Prima, buried in a first- or early-second century tomb at Rome, dedicated by one or more of her children.
- Quintus Cossutius, a resident of Corinth, was the former master of Quintus Cossutius Corinthus, Quintus Cossutius Speratus, and perhaps Cossutia Prima, the wife of Speratus, freedmen buried in a first- or second-century tomb at Rome.
- Quintus Cossutius Q. Ɔ. l. Corinthus, a freedman of the Cossutii of Corinth, was buried in a first- or second-century tomb at Rome, along with his wife, Licinia Cinnamis, fellow freedman Quintus Cossutius Speratus and his wife, Cossutia Prima, and Marcus Decius Saliander.
- Cossutia Irene, built a first- or second-century tomb at Rome for her son, Gaius Calvius Mercator, aged six years, five months.
- Cossutia Prima, a freedwoman of the Cossutii of Corinth, was buried in a first- or second-century tomb at Rome, along with her husband, Quintus Cossutius Speratus, fellow freedman Quintus Cossutius Corinthus and his wife, Licinia Cinnamis, and Marcus Decius Saliander.
- Quintus Cossutius Q. l. Speratus, a freedman of the Cossutii of Corinth, was a lictor who served three decuriae when they appeared before the magistrates. He was buried in a first- or second-century tomb at Rome, along with his wife, Cossutia Prima, fellow freedman Quintus Cossutius Corinthus and his wife, Licinia Cinnamis, and Marcus Decius Saliander.
- Cossutius Mosicaitus, a boy buried at Virunum in Noricum, aged seven, along with his parents, Cossutius Silvanus and Quartla, in a tomb dating between the first and third centuries.
- Cossutius Silvanus, buried at Virunum, along with his wife, Quartla, and son, Mosicaitus, in a tomb dating between the first and third centuries.
- Cossutia Arescusa, built a first- or second-century tomb at Rome for her son, Felix, aged thirteen.
- Cossutius, named along with the goddess Ceres on a first-century ceramic tile from Herculaneum in Campania.
- Cossutius, named on ceramic tiles from Pompeii in Campania.
- Gnaeus Cossutius, the subject of a vulgar graffito written on a ceramic tile from Pompeii.
- Cossutia Clara, dedicated a cinerarium dating between the death of Augustus and the middle of the first century for her contubernalis, or "tent-mate", Gnaeus Cossutius Tertius.
- Gnaeus Cossutius Tertius, inurned at Rome, aged thirty-five, in a cinerarium dating between the death of Augustus and the middle of the first century, placed by his contubernalis, Cossutia Clara.
- Lucius Cossutius L. f. Costa, a military tribune serving with the Legio XV Apollinaris at Carnuntum in Pannonia Superior during the reign of Claudius.
- Cossutius Severus, along with Cossutia Thallusa, buried in a tomb dating between the reign of Claudius and the end of the first century, with two ossuary pots donated by Tiberius Claudius Epitynchanus. The inscription's original location is uncertain.
- Cossutia Thallusa, along with Cossutius Severus, buried in a tomb dating between the reign of Claudius and the end of the first century, with two ossuary pots donated by Tiberius Claudius Epitynchanus. The inscription's original location is uncertain.
- Cossutia, the wife of Sextus Valerius Valerianus, who built a sepulchre at Aquileia, dating between the middle of the first century and the middle of the second for himself, his wife, his mother, Valeria Secunda, and several close friends.
- Gnaeus Cossutius Eustrophus, along with Lucius Manlius Philadelphus, caretakers of the Horrea Agrippiana, or granaries of Agrippa, to the spirit of which they dedicated an inscription on the fifth day before the Ides of June (Note: June 9.) in an uncertain year between the latter half of the first and the first half of the second century.
- Gnaeus Cossutius Bassus, the master of Nicephorus, a slave buried at Rome, aged twenty-seven, in a tomb dating between the latter half of the first century and the end of the second. The inscription is thought to be modern.
- Gnaeus Cossutius Cn. l. Felix, a freedman born the third day before the Kalends of February, (Note: January 30.) AD 62, and buried at Rome.
- Gnaeus Cossutius Atimetus, named in an inscription from Pompeii in Campania, dating from just after the middle of the first century.
- Marcus Cossutius Felix, a soldier in the century of Sextus [...]tus Iuvenis, named in an inscription from the Domus Vespasiani at Rome, dating from AD 70 or 71. At least part of the inscription may be modern.
- Gnaeus Cossutius Atimetus, a paenularius, or cloak-maker, buried in a late first-century tomb at Puteoli in Campania.
- Marcus Cossutius Zeuxis, a freedman working as a sculptor at Rome, according to an inscription from the Forum of Caesar, probably dating from the late first century. (Note: Rawson, "The Activities of the Cossutii", p. 40.)
- Cossutia, the mother of Flavia, a woman buried at Ostia in Latium, in a tomb dating from the late first or early second century.
- Cossutia Amaranthis, named along with Titus Annius Lotus, perhaps her husband, and several others in a funeraryinscription from Copia in Bruttium, dating from the late first or early second century.
- Publius Cossutius Bassus Apollinaris, the freedman of Zethus, dedicated a tomb at Mutina in Cisalpine Gaul, dating from the late first or early second century, for himself and Quintus Acutius Optatus, Fulvia Quarta, Gaius Geminus Lepidus, and Publius Refrius Gratus.
- Gaius Cossutius C. l. Epaphroditus, a freedman, restored the altar of Silvanus, and the temple, altar, and statue of Hercules at Rome in AD 79. (Note: Rawson, "The Activities of the Cossutii", p. 41.)
- Sextus Cossutius Sex. f. Primus, a veteran of the thirteenth urban cohort, buried at Lugdunum in Gallia Lugdunensis, in a tomb built by his friend, Titus Silius Hospes, signifer of the same cohort, dating from the first half of the second century.
- Cossutia Tyche, buried at Tergeste, in a family sepulchre built by the freedman Lucius Usius Philippus, dating from the first half of the second century.
- Cossutia Sex. f., flaminica of the cult of Faustina at Aquileia, and at Iader in Dalmatia, named in a second-century inscription from Iader.
- Cossutia Acme, named in a second-century inscription from Rome, along with her husband, [...]ius Ph[...], and their child or children, whose names have not been preserved.
- Cossutius Adjectus, dedicated a second-century tomb at Rome for his wife, Fictoria Prisca.
- Gnaeus Cossutius Apriclus, together with Appuleia Lochias, probably his wife, and Lucius Appuleius Regillus, built a second-century tomb at Rome for Appuleia Gratilla, their verna, or home-born slave, the daughter of Regillus, aged fourteen years, six months, and fifteen days.
- Gaius Cossutius Donatus, buried at Rome, aged sixteen years, ten months, and fourteen days, in a second-century tomb built by his mother, Cossutia Threpte.
- Gnaeus Cossutius Hermes, buried at Rome along with his wife, Cossutia Onesime, in a second-century tomb built by their son, Gnaeus Cossutius Super.
- Marcus Cossutius Hermes, dedicated a second-century tomb at Rome for his children, Cossutius Hemetianus, Cossutius Honoratus, and Cossutia Victorina.
- (Marcus) Cossutius Hermetianus, along with his siblings, Cossutius Honoratus and Cossutia Victorina, buried at Rome in a second-century tomb built by their father, Marcus Cossutius Hermes.
- Quintus Cossutius Hilarus, one of a number of persons named in a second-century inscription from Philippi in Macedonia.
- (Marcus) Cossutius Honoratus, along with his siblings, Cossutius Hermetianus and Cossutia Victorina, buried at Rome in a second-century tomb built by their father, Marcus Cossutius Hermes.
- (Gnaeus) Cos(sutius?) Martialis, built a second-century tomb at Rome for his young son, Gnaeus Cossutius Sacos.
- Cossutia Onesime, buried at Rome along with her husband, Gnaeus Cossutius Hermes, in a second-century tomb built by their son, Gnaeus Cossutius Super.
- Servius Cossutius Primus, buried in a second-century tomb at Thessalonica in Macedonia, along with Plusia, the freedwoman of Nicarchus.
- Gnaeus Cos(sutius?) Sacos, the son of Martialis, buried in a second-century tomb at Rome, aged five years, eleven months, and ten days.
- Gnaeus Cossutius Cn. f. Super, built a second-century tomb at Rome for his parents, Gnaeus Cossutius Hermes and Cossutia Onesime.
- Cossutia Threpte, built a second-century tomb at Rome for her son, Gaius Cossutius Donatus.
- Cossutia Victorina, along with her siblings, Cossutius Hermetianus and Cossutius Honoratus, buried at Rome in a second-century tomb built by their father, Marcus Cossutius Hermes.
- Cossutia C. l. Fausta, dedicated a second- or third-century tomb at Thessalonica for her husband, Titus Brotius Zosimus.
- Marcus Cossutius Zeuxis, dedicated a second- or third-century tomb at Rome for his brother, Sabinius Salvius.
- Gaius Cossutius C. l. Gentius, one of a number of freedmen named in an inscription from Casilinum in Campania, dating from AD 105, recording the building of an arch, steps, and drains by the masters of the cults of Castor and Pollux and Mercury.
- Sextus Cossutius Secundus, one of the municipal officials at Aquileia in AD 105, who was present at the dedication of a statue in honour of Gaius Minicius Italus.
- Gaius Cossutius Nigrinus, carved an inscription recording the dedication of the vexillum of the Legio II Traiana Fortis to the god Mercury at Pselkis in Egypt on the Nones of February, (Note: February 5.) AD 127.
- Publius Cossutius [...] P. n. Amatus, a priest of Jupiter Optimus Maximus at Misenum in Campania, commemorated in an inscription from the middle or later part of the second century.
- Gnaeus Cossutius L. f. Successinus, one of the municipal quattuorvirs at Carsioli in Sabinum, had been quaestor and in charge of the treasury. He was honored by a decree of the Roman Senate, dating from the latter half of the second century.
- Cossutius Rufinus, one of the local officials who in AD 187 dedicated a statue in memory of Gavia Marciana at Puteoli in Campania.
- Marcus Cossutius M. f. Proculeianus, a native of Mevania in Umbria, was a soldier in the twelfth urban cohort at Rome in AD 197, serving in the century of Severianus.
- Cossutius, the father of Victorina, for whom he built a third-century Christian tomb at Rome.
- Marcus Cossutius Felix, the husband of Valeria Si[...], named in the third-century sepulchral inscription of Marcus Apidius Epictetus at Rome.
- (Titus) Cossutius T. f. Firmus, a youth buried at Ovilava, aged fifteen, in a third-century family sepulchre built by his father, the decurion Titus Flavius Victorinus, for himself, his wife, Cossutia Vera, and their children, Firmus and Flavia Victorina.
- Gaius Cossutius Saturninus, a native of Hippo Regius in Africa, was a soldier in the Legio VI Victrix, stationed in Britain at some point during the third century.
- Cossutia Vera, buried at Ovilava in Noricum, aged fifty, in a third-century family sepulchre built by her husband, Titus Flavius Victorinus, a veteran of and decurion in the ala Tampiana, a Roman cavalry unit, for himself, his wife, and their children, Flavia Victorina, aged twenty-three, and Cossutius Firmus.
- Cossutius Eutyches, a soldier in the Legio II Parthica, dedicated a tomb for Aurelia Romana, his wife of twenty-eight years, the third day before the Ides of April, (Note: April 11.) AD 201.
- Cossutius Festus, a soldier in the first cohort of the Vigiles at Rome in AD 205, in the century of Gaius Mancilius Juvenis.
- Cossutius, buried in a fourth- or fifth-century tomb at Rome, aged about sixty.

== Undated Cossutii ==
- Cossutia, buried at Rome along with her husband, Gaius Terentius Potamon, and son, Gaius Terentius Saturninus, aged fourteen years, eleven months.
- Cossutia, the daughter of Alfius, one of the Vestals, buried at Augusta Vindelicorum in Raetia, aged eighty-two years, ten months, and six days, along with Lucius Caecilius Priscus, one of the seviri Augustales of that place. The inscription is thought to be modern.
- Cossutia Cn. l., a freedwoman named in an inscription from Rome, along with fellow freedwomen Cossutia Acris and Cossutia Plebs, and the freedmen Gnaeus Cossutius Philomusus and Cossutius Plebeius.
- Cossutia P. f., named along with Numerius Vibius Flaccus in an inscription from Potentia in Lucania.
- Cossutius, buried at Rome along with Lucia Florentina and their family, with a wall around their graves.
- Cossutius, named in inscriptions from Antioch in Syria.
- Cossutius, the father of a man buried at Emona in Pannonia Superior, aged thirty, along with his wife, Secunda, the daughter of Valens, aged forty.
- Gnaeus Cossutius, buried at Rome.
- Gnaeus Cossutius, named in the funerary inscription of his freedwoman, Cossutia Helpis.
- Gnaeus Cossutius, along with his wife, Cossutia Trophime, dedicated a tomb at Rome for their son, whose name has not been preserved.
- Gnaeus Cossutius, buried at Ostia; his age is partly obliterated, but was at least ten years, and ended with twenty-one days.
- Lucius Cossutius M. [...], one of several persons named in an inscription from Delos or Ortygia in Achaia.
- Lucius Cossutius M. f., buried at Altinum in Venetia and Histria.
- Quintus Cossutius L. f., buried at Mustis in Africa.
- Cossutius Cn. l. Acris, a freedwoman named in an inscription from Rome, along with fellow freedwomen Cossutia Plebs and another Cossutia, and the freedmen Gnaeus Cossutius Philomusus and Cossutius Plebeius.
- Cossutius Adjutor, buried at Simitthus, aged seventy-two.
- Marcus Cossutius Adjutor, buried at Simitthus, aged seventy-five.
- Cossutia Anatole, dedicated a tomb at Rome for herself and her patron, whose name has not been preserved.
- (Gnaeus) Cossutius Asteris, along with Cossutius Bassus, former masters of Gnaeus Cossutius Januarius, a boy buried at Rome.
- Gnaeus Cossutius Atimetus, buried at Rome, aged forty, in a tomb dedicated by his daughter, Cossutia Epictesis.
- (Gnaeus) Cossutius Bassus, along with Cossutius Asteris, former masters of Gnaeus Cossutius Januarius, a boy buried at Rome.
- Cossutia M. l. Bela, named in an inscription from Rome.
- Cossutia Callytyche, buried at Rome, in a tomb dedicated by her husband, Tiberius Claudius Hid[...].
- Cossutius Cerdon, dedicated a tomb at Massilia in Gallia Narbonensis for the freedwoman Cossutia Epictesis.
- Marcus Cossutius Chresimus, named in two bronze inscriptions from an uncertain province.
- Cossutia Cinura, named in an inscription from Rome.
- Gaius Cossutius C. f. Crispus, a freedman, was an agent assisting the duumviri quinquennales in taking the census at Rome.
- Marcus Cossutius M. l. Dom[...], together with Lucius Valerius Antiochus, freedmen and marmorarii, or marbleworkers, made an offering to Fortuna Primigenia at Pisae in Etruria.
- (Cossutius) Donatus, the son of Marcus Cossutius Mar[...], who sacrificed a lamb to Saturn at Nicivibus in Numidia in order to save his son's life.
- Cossutia Cn. f. Epictesis, dedicated a tomb at Rome for her father, Gnaeus Cossutius Atimetus.
- Cossutia Epictesis, a freedwoman buried at Massilia, in a tomb dedicated by Cossutius Cerdon.
- Cossutius Eutycles, named along with Pompeia Judaea, in an inscription from Arelate in Gallia Narbonensis.
- Quintus Cossutius L. f. Fortunatianus, a priest, was buried at Mustis, aged seventy.
- Cossutius Gududus, one of the mensores (Note: Literally, "measurer", typically referring to an official accounting for quantities of grain, or to a surveyor, or an engineer.) named in an inscription from Lambaesis in Numidia.
- Marcus Cossutius Heliodorus, built a family sepulchre at Rome, adjacent to or combined with the one built by Pedania Paetina for her son, Gaius Pedanius Successus, and his wife, Caepia Glypte.
- Cossutia Cn. l. Helpis, the freedwoman of Gnaeus Cossutius, was buried at Rome, aged thirty-five.
- Marcus Cossutius Hermes, built a tomb at Rome for his son, Marcus Cossutius Titianus.
- Quintus Cossutius Homullus, buried at Mustis, aged twenty.
- Cossutia Hygia, dedicated a tomb at Massilia for her daughter, Julia Quintina.
- Lucius Cossutius Hymnus, dedicated a tomb at Rome for his patron, Cossutia Primigenia. The inscription is thought to be modern.
- Gnaeus Cossutius (Cn. Cn. l.) Januarius, the son of Epitynchanus, and freedman of Cossutius Bassus and Cossutius Asteris, was buried at Rome, aged nine.
- Marcus Cossutius Macrinus, made an offering to the cult of Aesculapius at Olisipo in Lusitania.
- Marcus Cossutius Mar[...], sacrificed a lamb to Saturn at Nicivibus to save the life of his son, Donatus.
- Marcus Cossutius Menander, in whose honour Fuficia Helena dedicated three pots at Rome for herself, Menander, and Marcus Perelius Neo.
- Cossutius Myrmex, the master of Promus, a slave named in an inscription from Rome.
- Cossutia Nice, dedicated a tomb at Massilia for her husband, Sextus Annius Chasinus.
- Decimus Cossutius Nicia, named in an inscription from Rome, along with the freedwoman Canuleia Prima, probably his wife.
- Cossutius Paratus, the freedman of Cossutia Tertulla, named in an inscription from Rome, along with the freedwoman Cossutia Severa.
- Marcus Cossutius Phoebus, buried at Rome.
- Gnaeus Cossutius Philomusus, a freedman named in an inscription from Rome, along with fellow freedman Cossutius Plebeius, and the freedwomen Cossutia Acris, Cossutia Plebs, and another Cossutia.
- (Gnaeus) Cossutius Plebeius, a freedman named in an inscription from Rome, along with fellow freedman Cossutius Philomusus, and the freedwomen Cossutia Acris, Cossutia Plebs, and another Cossutia.
- Cossutia Cn. l. Plebs, a freedwoman named in an inscription from Rome, along with fellow freedwomen Cossutia Acris and another Cossutia, and the freedmen Gnaeus Cossutius Philomusus and Cossutius Plebeius.
- Cossutia Primigenia, buried at Rome, in a tomb dedicated by her client, Lucius Cossutius Hymnus. The inscription is thought to be modern.
- Marcus Cossutius Protus, one of the Seviri Augustales at Ostia, commemorated in an inscription left by his client, the freedman Agathopus.
- Marcus Cossutius Rufio, buried at Arelate in Gallia Narbonensis, along with Cossutia Soteria.
- Publius Cossutius S[...], named in an inscription from Valentia in Gallia Narbonensis.
- Cossutia Secunda, the wife of Egregius Restitutus, with whom she built a tomb at Rome for themselves and their dear friend, Junia Hippice, aged twenty-two years, seven months, and seven days.
- Quintus Cossutius Seneca, a young man buried at Sicca Veneria in Africa, aged twenty-three, in a tomb dedicated by his tent-mates.
- Cossutia Severa, the freedwoman of Cossutia Tertulla, named in an inscription from Rome, along with the freedman Cossutius Paratus.
- Marcus Cossutius M. f. Severus, buried at Rome.
- Cossutia Soteria, buried at Arelate, along with Marcus Cossutius Rufio.
- Gaius Cossutius C. l. Status, a freedman named in an inscription from Rome.
- Marcus Cossutius M. l. Stephanus, a freedman named in an inscription from Rome.
- Cossutia Symferusa, buried at Rome, in a tomb dedicated by her daughter, Anencletis.
- Cossutia M. f. Tertulla, named in an inscription from Rome, along with her freedman, Cossutius Paratus, and freedwoman, Cossutia Severa.
- Marcus Cossutius M. f. Titianus, buried at Rome, in a tomb dedicated by his father, Marcus Cossutius Hermes.
- Marcus Cossutius Titullus, buried at Rome, aged thirty-five. The inscription is thought to be modern.
- Cossutia Trophime, along with her husband, Gnaeus Cossutius, dedicated a tomb at Rome for their son, whose name has not been preserved.
- Cossutia Tyche, buried at Rome.
- Cossutia Tyrannis, the wife of Marcus Cossutius Zosimus, who built a sepulchre at Rome for himself, Tyrannis, and their family.
- Cossutius Valentinus, dedicated a tomb at Rome for his wife, whose name has not been preserved, aged seventy-five.
- Cossutia P. f. Veneria, buried at Ammaedara, aged thirty, in a tomb built by her husband, Lucius Sergius Sterceius.
- Cossutia Victoria, buried at Massilia in a tomb dedicated by her husband, Pompeius Abascantus.
- Gnaeus Cossutius Zoilus, buried in a family sepulchre at Rome, built by Septimia Beronice for herself and her husband, Tiberius Claudius Fronimus, their son, Tiberius Claudius Beronicianus, and Zoilus.
- Marcus Cossutius Zosimus, built a sepulchre at Rome for his wife, Cossutia Tyrannis, and their family.

== See also ==
- List of Roman gentes
- Cossutianus Capito

== Bibliography ==
=== Ancient sources ===
- Athenaeus, Deipnosophistae (The Banquet of the Learned).
- Titus Livius (Livy), History of Rome.
- Gaius Plinius Secundus (Pliny the Elder), Historia Naturalis (Natural History).
- Strabo, Geographica.
- Gaius Suetonius Tranquillus, De Vita Caesarum (Lives of the Caesars, or The Twelve Caesars).
- Marcus Tullius Cicero, Epistulae ad Familiares, In Verrem.
- Marcus Velleius Paterculus, Roman History.
- Marcus Vitruvius Pollio, De Architectura (On Architecture).

=== Modern sources ===
- René Cagnat et alii, L'Année épigraphique (The Year in Epigraphy, abbreviated AE), Presses Universitaires de France (1888–present).
- Archeologia Veneta, Società archeologica veneta.
- Atti della Accademia Nazionale dei Lincei (Acts of the National Academy of the Lincei), Rome (1901–1916).
- Bullettino della Commissione Archeologica Comunale in Roma (Bulletin of the Municipal Archaeological Commission of Rome, abbreviated BCAR), (1872–present).
- Maria Letizia Caldelli et al., Epigrafia ostiense dopo il CIL. 2000 iscrizioni funerarie (Ostian Epigraphy after the CIL: 2,000 Funerary Inscriptions), Venice (2018).
- La Carte Archéologique de la Gaule (Archaeological Map of Gaul, abbreviated CAG), Académie des Inscriptions et Belles-Lettres (1931–present).
- George Davis Chase, "The Origin of Roman Praenomina", in Harvard Studies in Classical Philology, vol. VIII, pp. 103–184 (1897).
- Dictionary of Greek and Roman Biography and Mythology, William Smith, ed., Little, Brown and Company, Boston (1849).
- Epigraphica, Rivista Italiana di Epigrafia (1939–present).
- Martin Hostnik, Cerkev sv. Mihaela v Iški vasi (The Church of St. Mihaela in Iski Vasi), Ljubljana (1997).
- Inscriptiones Christianae Urbis Romae (Christian Inscriptions from the City of Rome, abbreviated ICUR), New Series, Rome (1922–present).
- Inscriptions grecques et latines de la Syrie (Greek and Latin Inscriptions of Syria, abbreviated IGLS), Paris (1929–present).
- Ramon L. Jiménez, Caesar against Rome: The Great Roman Civil War, Praeger, Westport (2000), ISBN 0-275-96620-8.
- Theodor Mommsen et alii, Corpus Inscriptionum Latinarum (The Body of Latin Inscriptions, abbreviated CIL), Berlin-Brandenburgische Akademie der Wissenschaften (1853–present).
- Notizie degli Scavi di Antichità (News of Excavations from Antiquity, abbreviated NSA), Accademia dei Lincei (1876–present).
- Peter Pilhofer, Philippi, Band 2: Katalog der Inschriften von Philippi (Catalog of Inscriptions from Philippi), Tübingen (2nd Edition, 2009).
- Elizabeth Rawson, "Architecture and Sculpture: The Activities of the Cossutii", in Papers of the British School at Rome, Cambridge University Press (2013), vol. 43, pp. 36–47, JSTOR 40310719.
- The Roman Inscriptions of Britain (abbreviated RIB), Oxford, (1990–present).
- Ben Russell, The Economics of the Roman Stone Trade, Oxford University Press (2013), ISBN 978-0-19-965639-4.
- David R. Sear, The History and Coinage of the Roman Imperators 49–27 BC, Spink (1998), ISBN 9780907605980.
- Veikko Väänänen, Le iscrizioni della necropoli dell'autoparco Vaticano (The Inscriptions of the Vatican Car Park Necropolis), Bardi, Rome (1973).
