= Decimus Cossutius =

2nd-century BCE Roman architect

- Citizenship: Roman
- Occupation: Architect
- Years active: c. 175 BCE
- Known for: Continuation of the construction of the Temple of Olympian Zeus, Athens
- Family: Gens Cossutia
- Patron: Antiochus IV Epiphanes

Decimus Cossutius (Note: Also spelled Quossutius, by Vitruvius.) (fl. c. 175 BCE) was an ancient Roman architect. He is both the first known Roman architect known by name and one of the earliest Romans known to have resided in the city of Athens. A Roman citizen from a minor plebeian family, he may have trained in architecture either in Campania or in Greece, and possibly had personal or family business interests in marble quarrying. Around 175 BCE, he was commissioned by the Seleucid king Antiochus IV Epiphanes to continue the construction of the Temple of Olympian Zeus in Athens, which had been unfinished since its first phase of construction was abandoned around 510 BCE.

Cossutius planned his continuation of the Temple of Olympian Zeus as a large building in the Corinthian order, with two rows of columns in its peristasis (colonnade) and an additional third row of columns along the east and west sides. It is debated whether he intended the central cella to be roofed or open to the air, but no roof had been constructed by the time of Antiochus's death in November 164 BCE. Without its patron, construction ceased: parts of the temple, including the outer colonnade of the southeast corner, had been built up to the height of the epistyle (architrave beam). According to the Roman architectural writer Vitruvius, Cossutius's work was highly regarded by experts and laypeople in architecture alike.

The Temple of Olympian Zeus was eventually finished under the Roman emperor Hadrian in 138 CE; this final phase largely followed Cossutius's plan. Cossutius may also have worked for Antiochus on other projects; scratched inscriptions bearing his name are known from an aqueduct at Antioch, Antiochus's capital, perhaps made by workers in his employ. Glanville Downey suggests that Antiochus may have employed Cossutius in his project to construct a new district for Antioch, known as Epiphania, and that he may have designed the city's temple of Jupiter Capitolinus.

== Biography ==
=== Early life and origins ===
Decimus Cossutius is the first Roman architect known by name, and one of the earliest Romans known to have resided in Athens. He was a Roman citizen, and the first known prominent member of the gens Cossutia, a minor plebeian family which became important in the supply, carving and architectural employment of stone in the Roman world. (Note: Rawson 1975, pp. 36–37; Russell 2013, p. 205 (for the family's involvement in the stone industry). For the rank of the gens Cossutia, see Jiménez 2000, p. 13.) On the grounds of the forenames (praenomina) and epithets (cognomina) used by the gens, Mario Torelli suggests that they originated in Italy, perhaps in the upland region of Sabina near Rome.

Cossutius probably originated in Campania, a wealthy region to the south of Rome heavily influenced by Greek culture. He may have trained as an architect either in Campania or in Greece; Elizabeth Rawson suggests that Cossutius's family may have lived in Athens. The later Roman architectural writer Vitruvius, who lived in the 1st century BCE, writes of Cossutius as being among antiqui nostri ('our ancestors'), whom he contrasts with Greek architects. Herbert Abramson infers from this that he was probably a Roman citizen by birth rather than by acquisition. (Note: Abramson 1974, pp. 2–3, citing Vitruvius, De architectura 7, pr. 18.) Torelli suggests that Cossutius, like the contemporary Greek architect Hermogenes of Priene, may have been a quarry-manager as well as an architect, and that his family may already have had mining interests which aided him in securing architectural work.

=== Work on the Temple of Olympian Zeus ===
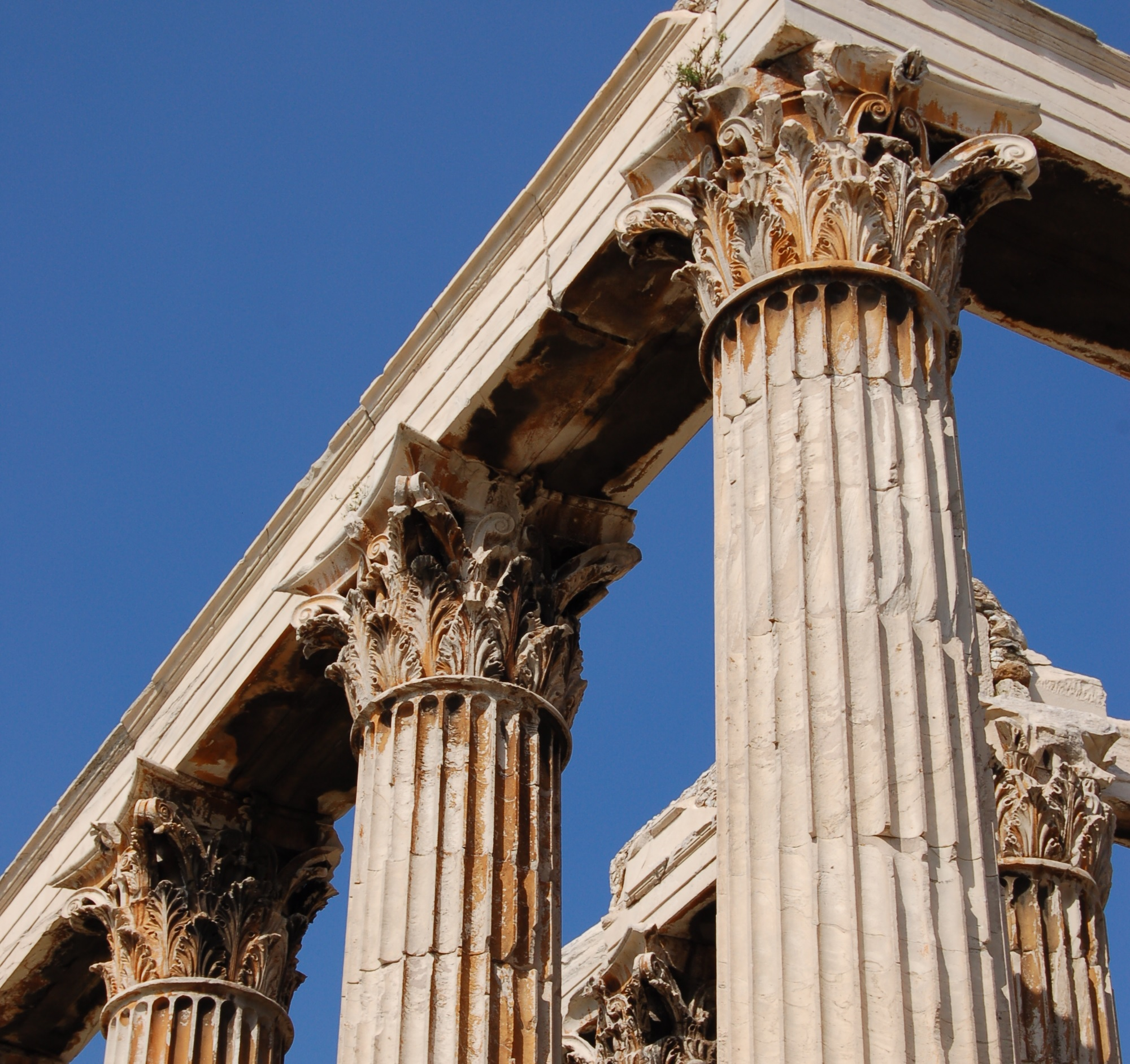
Corinthian columns and epistyle from the southeast corner of the Temple of Olympian Zeus. These are considered to date from Cossutius's work on the temple.

Around 175 BCE, Cossutius was commissioned by the Seleucid king Antiochus IV Epiphanes to continue the construction of the Temple of Olympian Zeus in Athens. (Note: R. E. Wycherley commented in 1964 that "why Antiochos selected a Roman is still a mystery". Andrew Stewart suggests that Antiochus's time as a hostage in Rome, between c. 187 and 178/177 BCE, gave him "a healthy respect for Roman efficiency and engineering skill". Olga Palagia writes that Antiochus's patronage of Cossutius reflected his broader association with Rome, while James Anderson considers it a result of his "Romanophile instincts" dating from his captivity.) Vitruvius uses the rare Latin verb architector to describe Cossutius's role, which James Anderson considers to imply that he was responsible for the design and planning of the whole project. The temple's construction had been initiated by the Athenian tyrants Hipparchus and Hippias (known as the Peisistratids after their father, Peisistratus) around 515 BCE, and it had been planned to be the largest temple in mainland Greece, (Note: Larger temples were known in Ionia, specifically the Heraion (temple of Hera) on the island of Samos; the Temple of Artemis at Ephesus, whose construction began around 560–550 BCE, was of similar size.) constructed in the Doric order and based upon a stylobate measuring 107 by 41 metres (350 by 130 ft). (Note: Sakka 2024, p. 165. For the temple's order, see Campbell 2007, p. 208.) However, the tyranny of the Peisistratids was overthrown around 510 BCE, and construction of the temple abandoned; some of its column drums were built into the city's defensive walls in 479 BCE.

Vitruvius describes Cossutius as possessing both scientia ('knowledge') and sollertia, a word which P. H. Schrijvers translates as 'practical skill'. (Note: Schrijvers 1987, p. 51, citing Vitruvius, De architectura 7, pr. 15.) His architectural style followed the norms of the Greek tradition, with no discernible Italic influence. Earlier efforts to finish the temple, at some point after the death of the statesman Lycurgus in about 325 BCE, had used marble from Mount Pentelicus, considered of particularly high quality and widely used in monuments and sculptures in fifth-century Athens. Cossutius's continuation used the same material, but changed the order of the temple to Corinthian. (Note: This made the building the first known large temple to use Corinthian columns on the outside, rather than purely internally, though Hugh Plommer considers that earlier examples probably existed.) The total structure was 110 by 43 metres (360 by 140 ft) in area, with two rows of columns in its peristasis (colonnade), an additional third row of columns along the east and west sides, a width of eight columns across its front, and of twenty (rather than the twenty-one planned for the Peisistratid temple) along each side. (Note: In architectural parlance, the temple was octastyle and dipteral: Campbell 2007, p. 208; Wycherley 1964, p. 170 (for the number of columns).) He built on top of the existing substructures, which were slightly adjusted in places, and retained the lower steps on the west front (the remainder being replaced with marble); he also reused column drums intended for the Peisistratid temple as foundations for his own columns. Hugh Plommer describes the style of capitals used by Cossutius as "stiffly orthodox", which he views as a reaction against the "impurity" of contemporary buildings elsewhere in the Mediterranean which mixed elements of different architectural orders. In addition to the strictly architectural aspects of the temple, Cossutius designed the decoration of the epistyle (the architrave beam) and the ornamental aspects of its architecture. A statue base found near temple in the early nineteenth century bore an inscription in Greek honouring "Decimus Cossutius, son of Publius, a Roman", (Note: Dodwell 1819, p. 391 (the original report of the inscription); Abramson 1974, p. 3; Carlà-Uhink 2017, p. 322. The inscription is known by the reference number IG II–III^{2} 4099, or IG III.1.561.) and is thought to refer to the architect.

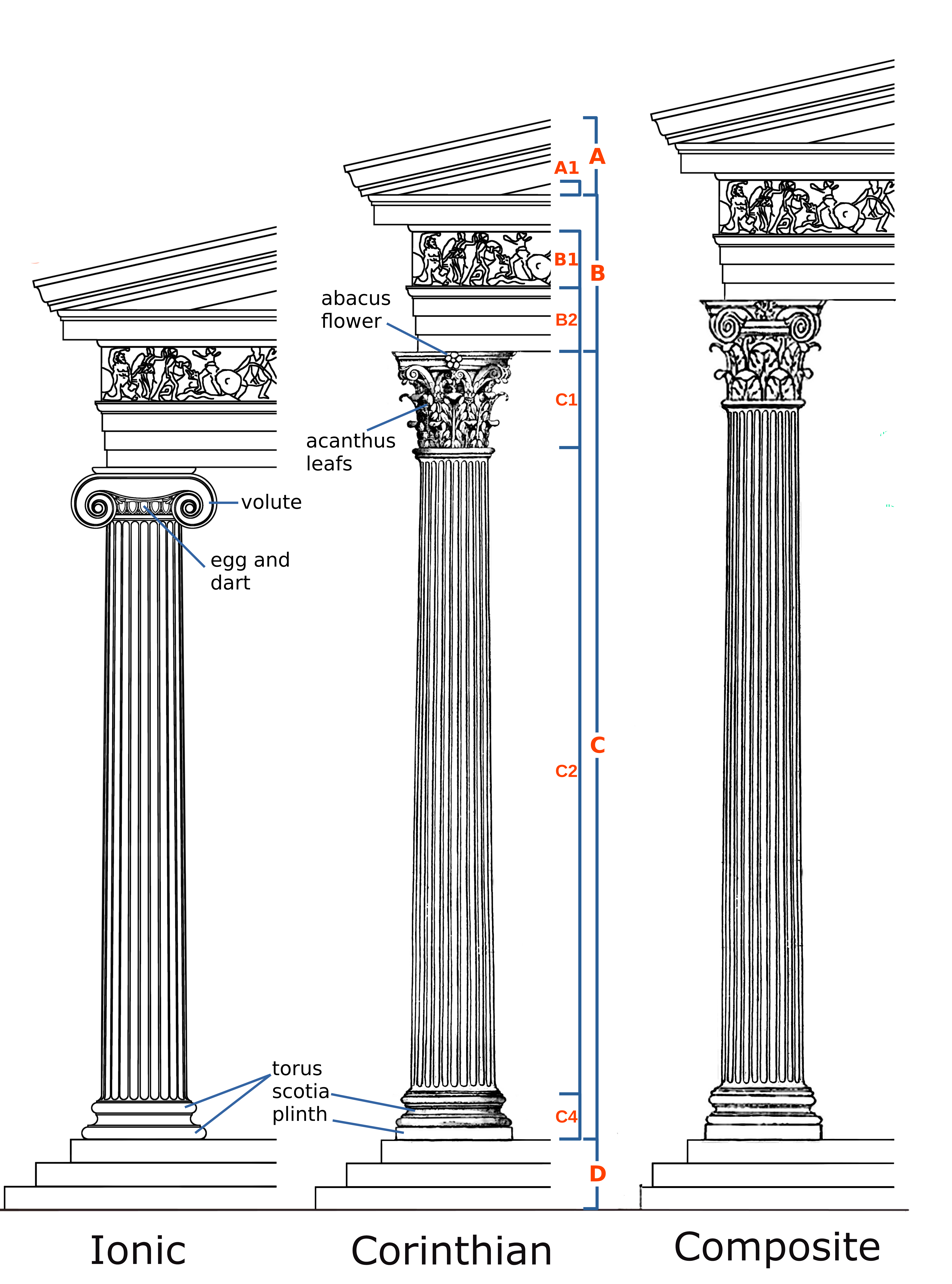
Comparison of Ionic, Corinthian and Composite columns

Vitruvius's account is the only ancient text describing in detail Cossutius's work on the Temple of Olympian Zeus; (Note: Abramson 1974, p. 2, citing Vitruvius, De architectura 7, pr. 15.) Cossutius left no written plans for how his work was intended to continue. Vitruvius uses it as an exemplar of a hypaethral temple (that is, one where the central cella was open to the air, rather than being roofed). R. E. Wycherley treats this as evidence that it was intended to be unroofed in its final iteration, though Wolfram Hoepfner believes that it was intended to be roofed, based on parallels with other large temples with double colonnades, and that Vitruvius or his source was misled by the fact that this roof was never constructed. Noting that it was usual practice for the order of columns to increase in elaboration from the exterior of the temple to the interior, Hoepfner suggests that Cossutius planned either to employ Composite columns, which combined elements of the Corinthian and Ionic orders, or to invent his own form of capital. (Note: As parallels, Hoepfner adduces the Belevi Mausoleum, constructed probably in the early third century BCE, which used Composite columns, and the later Temple of Apollo Sosianus, constructed in Rome between 34 and 20 BCE, which used novel variations on the Corinthian order.)

By the time of Antiochus's death in November of 164 BCE, (Note: Campbell 2007, p. 208. For the date of Antiochus's death, see Momigliano 1994, p. 38.) parts of the temple had been constructed to the height of the architrave, but the structure was unfinished. Building work was stopped, probably as the king's death removed its source of funding. According to Vitruvius, the work was highly regarded by experts and laypeople in architecture alike; Wycherley considers that its key components were probably complete by the time Vitruvius saw it. The Roman general Sulla, who besieged and captured Athens in 86 BCE, took columns from the temple to Rome: Wycherley considers these to have been unused parts, perhaps originally intended for the inner peristasis, from Cossutius's project. (Note: Wycherley 1964, pp. 170–171. For the date of Sulla's siege of Athens, see Dillon & Garland 2005, p. 513.) The eventual completion of the temple's construction, finished under the Roman emperor Hadrian (r. 117 – 138 CE) and generally assumed have been dedicated in 131/2 CE, largely followed the template begun by Cossutius.

=== Other architectural work ===
Antioch, as it appeared in the sixth century CE. Epiphania is to the southeast; the aqueduct runs from northeast to southwest.

Two inscriptions of Cossutius's name, in Latin characters, have been found at Antioch, Antiochus's capital, scratched into the channel of an aqueduct dated to the second century BCE. (Note: Downey 1961, p. 103. The inscriptions are numbered as IGLS 825.) These may have been made by Cossutius himself or workers in his employ, and have been taken as evidence by Glanville Downey that Antiochus employed Cossutius in his project to construct a new district for Antioch, known as Epiphania, which included the construction of a new agora (marketplace) and bouleuterion (assembly building). Downey suggests that he may have been tasked with designing the city's temple of Jupiter Capitolinus, and perhaps other monuments. Anderson points out that the fact that the Antioch inscriptions were made in Latin letters indicates that Cossutius's workforce included Latin speakers, and infers from this that Cossutius was normally based in Italy, rather than in Athens. He may also have worked on buildings in other Greek cities funded as gifts by Antiochus. The first marble temple in Rome was constructed in the 140s BCE, and Anderson speculates that Cossutius may have been responsible for its construction, if he were still alive.

== Bibliography ==
- Abramson, Herbert (1974). "The Olympieion in Athens and Its Connections with Rome". California Studies in Classical Antiquity. 7: 1–25. JSTOR 25010661.
- Anderson, James C. (1997). Roman Architecture and Society. New York: Johns Hopkins University Press. ISBN 0-8018-5546-2.
- Boëthius, Axel; Ward-Perkins, John (1970). Etruscan and Roman Architecture. The Pelican History of Art. Harmondsworth: Penguin. OCLC 1310601638 – via Internet Archive.
- Camp, John McK. (2001). The Archaeology of Athens. New Haven: Yale University Press. ISBN 0-300-10151-1 – via Internet Archive.
- Campbell, Gordon, ed. (2007). The Grove Encyclopedia of Classical Art and Architecture. Vol. 1. Oxford University Press. ISBN 978-0-19-530082-6.
- Carlà-Uhink, Filippo (2017). The "Birth" of Italy: The Institutionalization of Italy as a Region, 3rd–1st Century BCE. Berlin: De Gruyter. ISBN 978-3-11-054478-7.
- DeLaine, Janet (2024). Roman Architecture. Oxford History of Art. Oxford University Press. ISBN 978-0-19-269999-2.
- Dillon, Matthew; Garland, Lynda (2005). Ancient Rome: From the Early Republic to the Assassination of Julius Caesar. Abingdon: Routledge. ISBN 978-1-136-76136-2.
- Dodwell, Edward (1819). A Classical and Topographical Tour Through Greece, During the Years 1801, 1805, and 1806. London: Rodwell and Martin. OCLC 987771142.
- Downey, Glanville (1961). A History of Antioch in Syria from Seleucus to the Arab Conquest. Princeton University Press. OCLC 000398056.
- Frazer, James George, ed. (1898). Pausanias's Description of Greece. Vol. 2. London: Macmillan. OCLC 22092557.
- Gill, David W. (2013). "Mines and Quarries". In Wilson, Nigel (ed.). Encyclopedia of Ancient Greece. New York: Taylor and Francis. pp. 474–476. doi:10.4324/9780203958766. ISBN 978-0-203-95876-6.
- Habicht, Christian (1997). "Roman Citizens in Athens (228–31 B.C.)". In Hoff, Michael C.; Rotroff, Susan I. (eds.). The Romanization of Athens: Proceedings of an International Conference held at Lincoln, Nebraska (April 1996). Oxbow Monographs. Vol. 94. Oxford: Oxbow Books. pp. 9–18. ISBN 1-900188-51-1 – via Internet Archive.
- Hoepfner, Wolfram (1997). "Zum Hypaethral-Tempel bei Vitruv und zum Olympeion in Athen" [On the Hypaethral Temple in Vitruvius and the Olympeion in Athens] (PDF). Mitteilungen des Deutschen Archäologischen Instituts, Römische Abteilung (in German). 104: 291–300. doi:10.11588/propylaeumdok.00005811.
- Jiménez, Ramon L. (2000). Caesar Against Rome: The Great Roman Civil War. Westport: Praeger. ISBN 0-275-96620-8.
- Klein, Nancy L. (2010). "Architecture: Historical Overview". In Gagarin, Michael (ed.). The Oxford Encyclopedia of Ancient Greece and Rome. Oxford University Press. pp. 206–215. doi:10.1093/acref/9780195170726.001.0001. ISBN 978-0-19-517072-6.
- Momigliano, Arnaldo (1994). "The Second Book of Maccabees". In Berti, Silvia (ed.). Essays on Ancient and Modern Judaism. Translated by Masella-Gayley, Maura. University of Chicago Press. pp. 36–47. ISBN 0-226-53381-6.
- Palagia, Olga (1997). "Classical Encounters: Attic Sculpture After Sulla". In Hoff, Michael C.; Rotroff, Susan I. (eds.). The Romanization of Athens: Proceedings of an International Conference held at Lincoln, Nebraska (April 1996). Oxbow Monographs. Vol. 94. Oxford: Oxbow Books. pp. 81–96. ISBN 1-900188-51-1 – via Internet Archive.
- Plommer, Hugh (1963) [1956]. Ancient and Classical Architecture. Simpson's History of Architectural Development. Vol. 1. London: Longmans. OCLC 223329941 – via Internet Archive.
- Rawson, Elizabeth (1975). "Architecture and Sculpture: The Activities of the Cossutii". Papers of the British School at Rome. 43: 36–47. JSTOR 40310719.
- Russell, Ben (2013). The Economics of the Roman Stone Trade. Oxford University Press. ISBN 978-0-19-965639-4.
- Sakka, Niki (2024). "New Evidence on the Precinct of the Sanctuary of Olympian Zeus in Athens: The Multiple Aspects of a Major Project and its Impact on the City: A Preliminary Report". Annuario della Scuola Archeologica di Atene e delle Missioni Italiane in Oriente. 102: 164–179.
- Schrijvers, Petrus Hermanus (1987). "Vitruve 1 1,1: explication de texte". In Geertman, H.; De Jong, J. J. (eds.). Munus non ingratum: Proceedings of the International Symposium on Vitruvius's De architectura and the Hellenistic and Republican Architecture. BABESCH Supplements (in French). Vol. 2. Leiden: Brill. pp. 49–54. OCLC 29752169.
- Scolnic, Benjamin (2014). "Seleucid Coinage in 175–166 BCE and the Historicity of Daniel 11:21–2". Journal of Ancient History. 2 (1): 1–36. doi:10.1515/jah-2014-0009 – via ResearchGate.net.
- Stamper, John W. (2005). The Architecture of Roman Temples: The Republic to the Middle Empire. Cambridge University Press. ISBN 0-521-81068-X.
- Stewart, Andrew (2014). Art in the Hellenistic World: An Introduction. Cambridge University Press. ISBN 978-1-316-06145-9.
- Torelli, Mario (1980). "Industria estrattiva, lavoro artigianale, interessi economici: qualche appunto" [Extractive Industry, Artisanal Work and Economic Interests: Some Remarks]. Memoirs of the American Academy in Rome (in Italian). 36: 313–323. JSTOR 4238713.
- Webb, Pamela A. (1996). Hellenistic Architectural Sculpture: Figural Motifs in Western Anatolia and the Aegean Islands. Madison: University of Wisconsin Press. ISBN 0-299-14980-3.
- Wycherley, R. E. (1964). "The Olympeion at Athens". Greek, Roman, and Byzantine Studies. 5: 161–179.
