= Laudatio Iuliae amitae =

Funeral oration

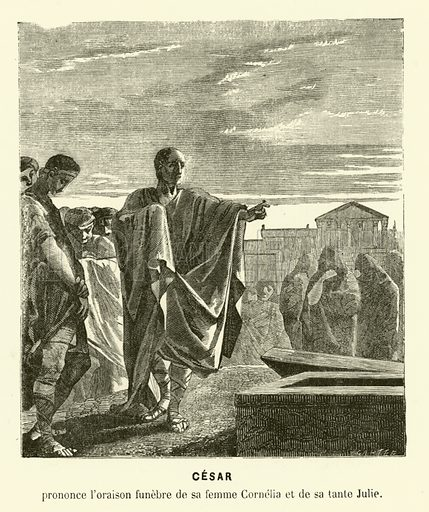
Caesar delivers a funeral oration for Julia and Calpurnia (Henri de Montaut, 1868)

The laudatio Iuliae amitae ("Eulogy for Aunt Julia") is a funeral oration that Julius Caesar said in 68 BC to honor his dead aunt Julia, the widow of Marius. The introduction of this laudatio funebris is reproduced in the work Divus Iulius by the Roman historian Suetonius:

When quaestor, he pronounced the customary orations from the rostra in praise of his aunt Julia and his wife Cornelia, who had both died, and in the eulogy of his aunt he spoke in the following terms of her paternal and maternal ancestry and that of his own father:

The family of my aunt Julia is descended by her mother from the kings and on her father's side is akin to the immortal gods. For the Marcii Reges go back to Ancus Marcius, and the Iulii, the family of which ours is a branch, to Venus. Our stock therefore has at once the sanctity of kings, whose power is supreme among mortal men, and the claim to reverence which attaches to the gods, who hold sway over kings themselves.

== See also ==
- Poetry by Julius Caesar
