= Temple of Olympian Zeus, Athens =

Ancient Greek temple in Athens

Coordinates: 37°58′9.74″N 23°43′59.08″E

Temple of Olympian Zeus
- Ναός του Ολυμπίου Διός
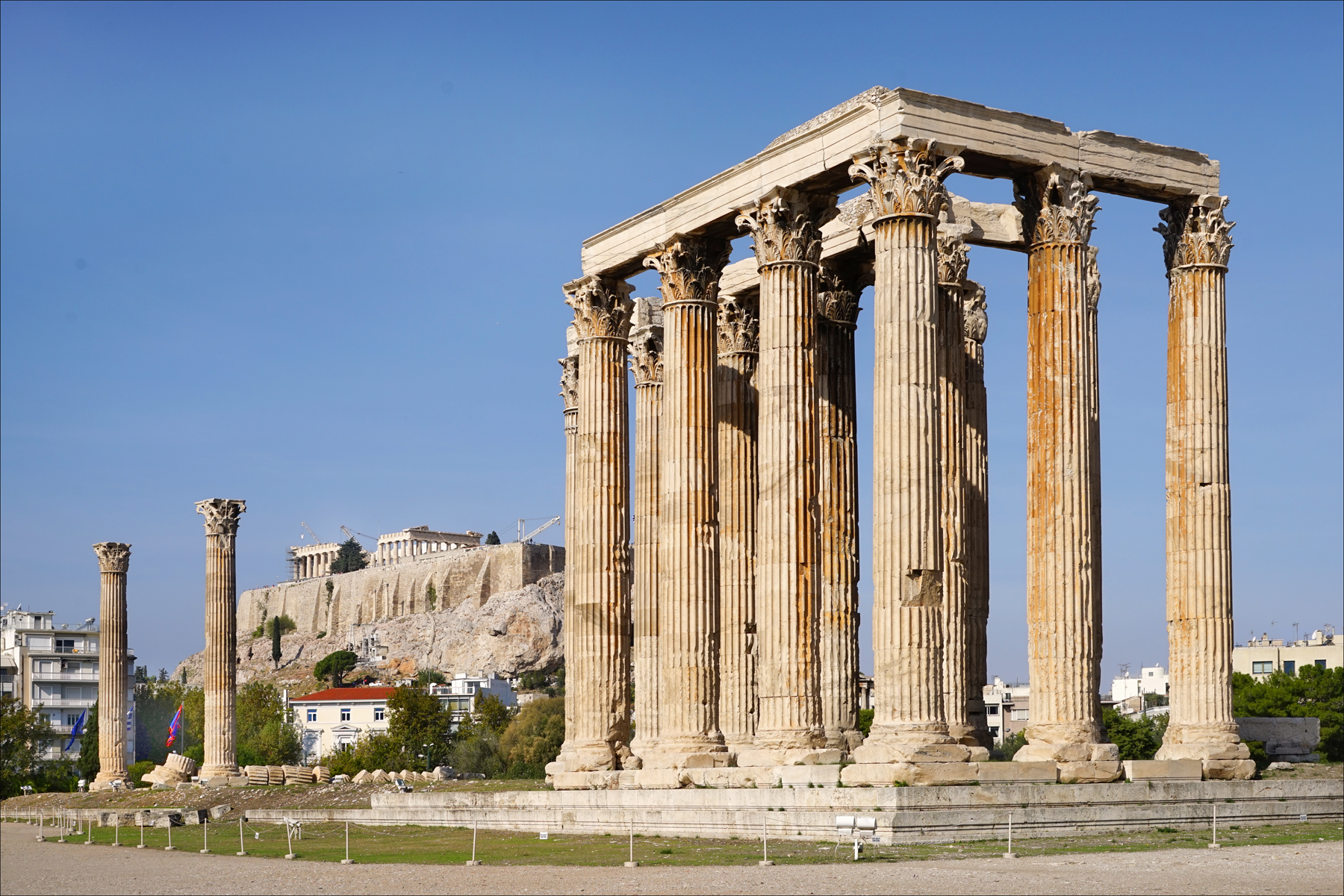
- Temple of Olympian Zeus

General information
- Type: Temple
- Architectural style: Classical
- Location: Athens, Greece
- Construction started: 561–527 BC
- Completed: 131 AD

Design and construction
- Architects: Antistatis, Kallaischros, Antimachides and Porinus

The Temple of Olympian Zeus (Ancient Greek: Ναὸς τοῦ Ὀλυμπίου Διός, Naós tou Olympíou Diós), also known as the Olympieion or Columns of the Olympian Zeus, is a colossal temple in the centre of Athens, now in ruins. It was dedicated to "Olympian" Zeus, a name originating from his position as head of the Olympian gods. Construction began in the 6th century BC during the rule of the Athenian tyrants, who envisioned building the greatest temple in the ancient world, but it was not completed until the reign of Roman Emperor Hadrian in the 2nd century AD, some 638 years after the project had begun. During the Roman period, the temple, which included 104 colossal columns, was renowned as the largest temple in Greece and housed one of the largest cult statues in the ancient world.

The temple's glory was short-lived, as it fell into disuse after being pillaged during a Germanic invasion in 267 AD, just about a century after its completion. It was probably never repaired, and was reduced to ruins thereafter. In the centuries after the fall of the Roman Empire, it was extensively quarried for building materials to supply building projects elsewhere in the city. Today, a substantial part of the temple remains intact, notably 16 of the original gigantic columns, and it is now the center of a historical precinct.

== History ==
=== Classical and Hellenistic periods ===
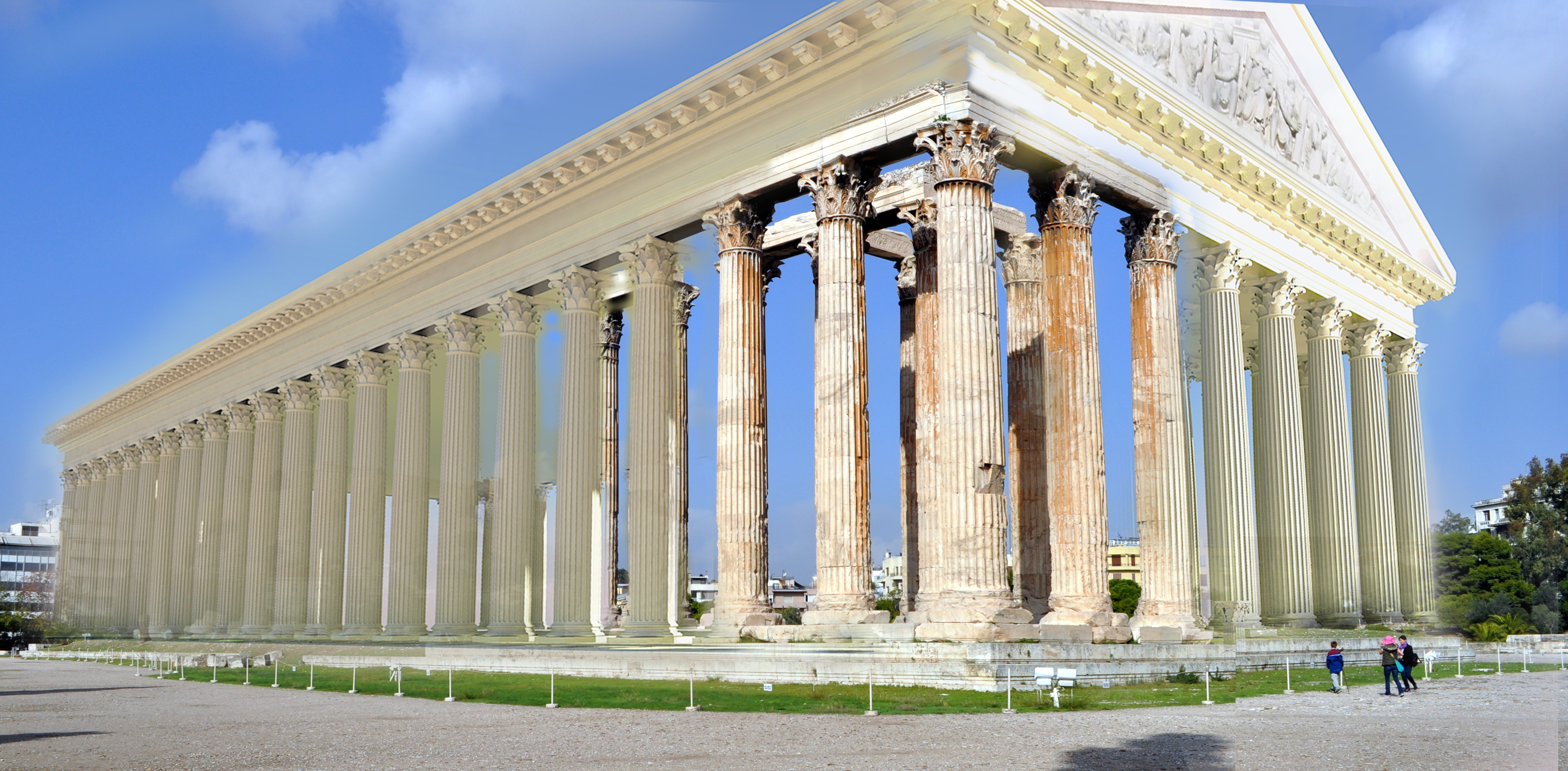
Likely appearance of the temple during antiquity

The temple is about 500 m (0.3 mi) south-east of the Acropolis (in the middle between Acropolis and Ardittos hill), and about 700 m (0.4 mi) south of the center of Athens, Syntagma Square. Its foundations were laid on the site of an ancient outdoor sanctuary dedicated to Zeus. An earlier temple had stood there, constructed by the tyrant Peisistratus around 550 BC. The building was demolished after the death of Peisistratus and the construction of a colossal new Temple of Olympian Zeus was begun around 520 BC by his sons, Hippias and Hipparchos. They sought to surpass two famous contemporary temples, the Heraion of Samos and the second Temple of Artemis at Ephesus. Designed by the architects Antistates, Callaeschrus, Antimachides and Porinus, the Temple of Olympian Zeus was intended to be built of local limestone in the Doric style on a colossal platform measuring 41 m (135 ft) by 108 m (354 ft). It was to be flanked by a double colonnade of eight columns across the front and back and twenty-one on the flanks, surrounding the cella.

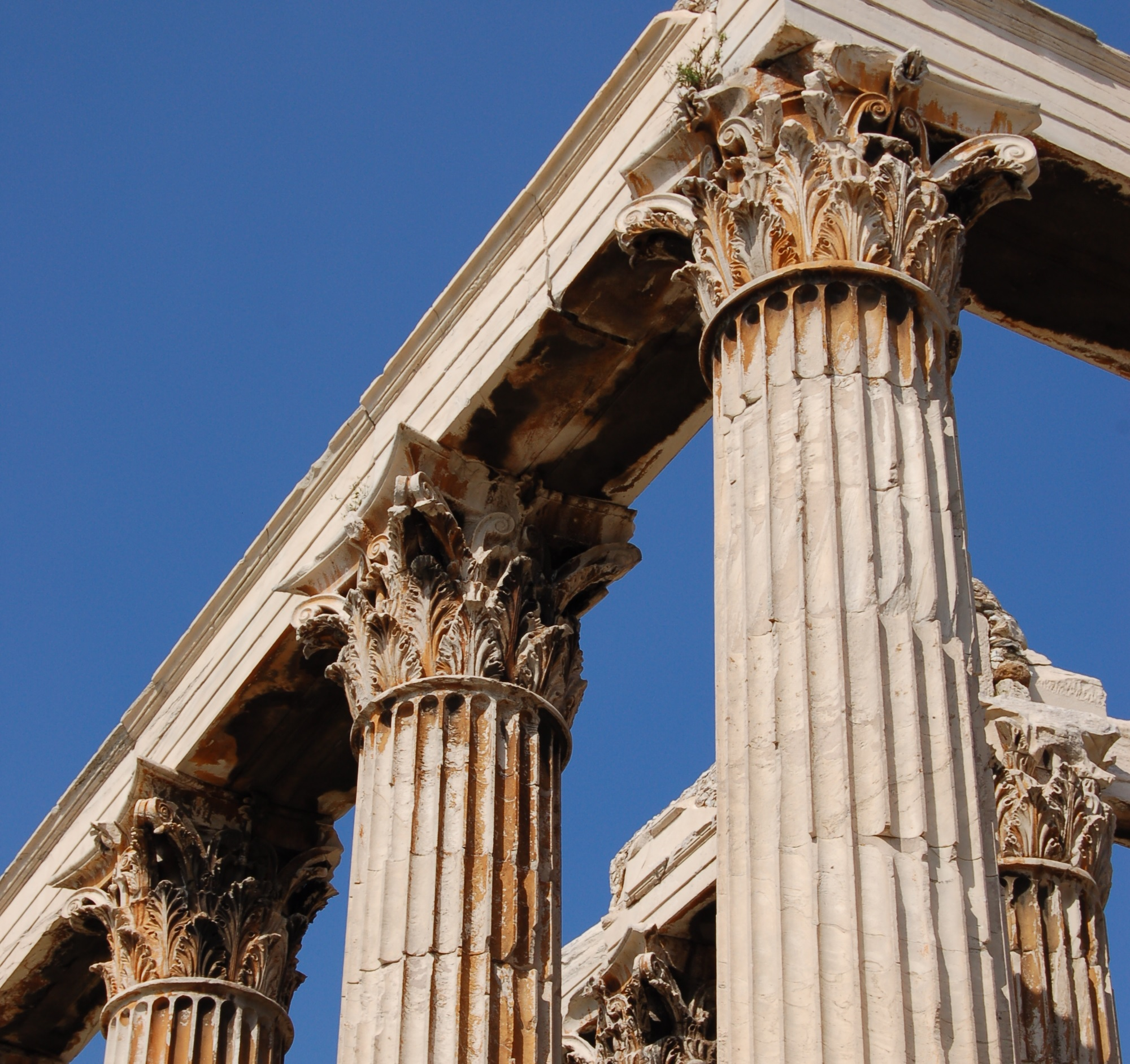
Corinthian columns detail

The work was abandoned when the tyranny was overthrown and Hippias was expelled in 510 BC. Only the platform and some elements of the columns had been completed by that point, and the temple remained in that state for 336 years. The temple was left unfinished during the years of Athenian democracy, apparently because the Greeks thought it was hubris to build on such a scale. In his treatise Politics, Aristotle cited the temple as an example of how tyrannies engaged the populace in great works for the state (like a white elephant) and left them no time, energy or means to rebel.

It was not until 174 BC that the Seleucid king Antiochus IV Epiphanes, who presented himself as the earthly embodiment of Zeus, revived the project and placed the Roman architect Decimus Cossutius in charge. The design was changed to have three rows of eight columns across the front and back of the temple and a double row of twenty on the flanks, for a total of 104 columns. The columns would stand 17 m (56 ft) high and 2 m (6 ft 7 in) in diameter. The building material was changed to the expensive but high-quality Pentelic marble and the order was changed from Doric to Corinthian, marking the first time that this order had been used on the exterior of a major temple. However, the project ground to a halt again in 164 BC with the death of Antiochus. The temple was still only half-finished by that stage.

Serious damage was inflicted on the partly built temple by Lucius Cornelius Sulla's sack of Athens in 86 BC. While looting the city, Sulla seized some of the incomplete columns and transported them to Rome, where they were re-used in the Temple of Jupiter on the Capitoline Hill. A half-hearted attempt was made to complete the temple during Augustus' reign as the first Roman emperor, but it was not until the accession of Hadrian in the 2nd century AD that the project was finally completed, around 638 years after it had begun.

=== Roman era ===
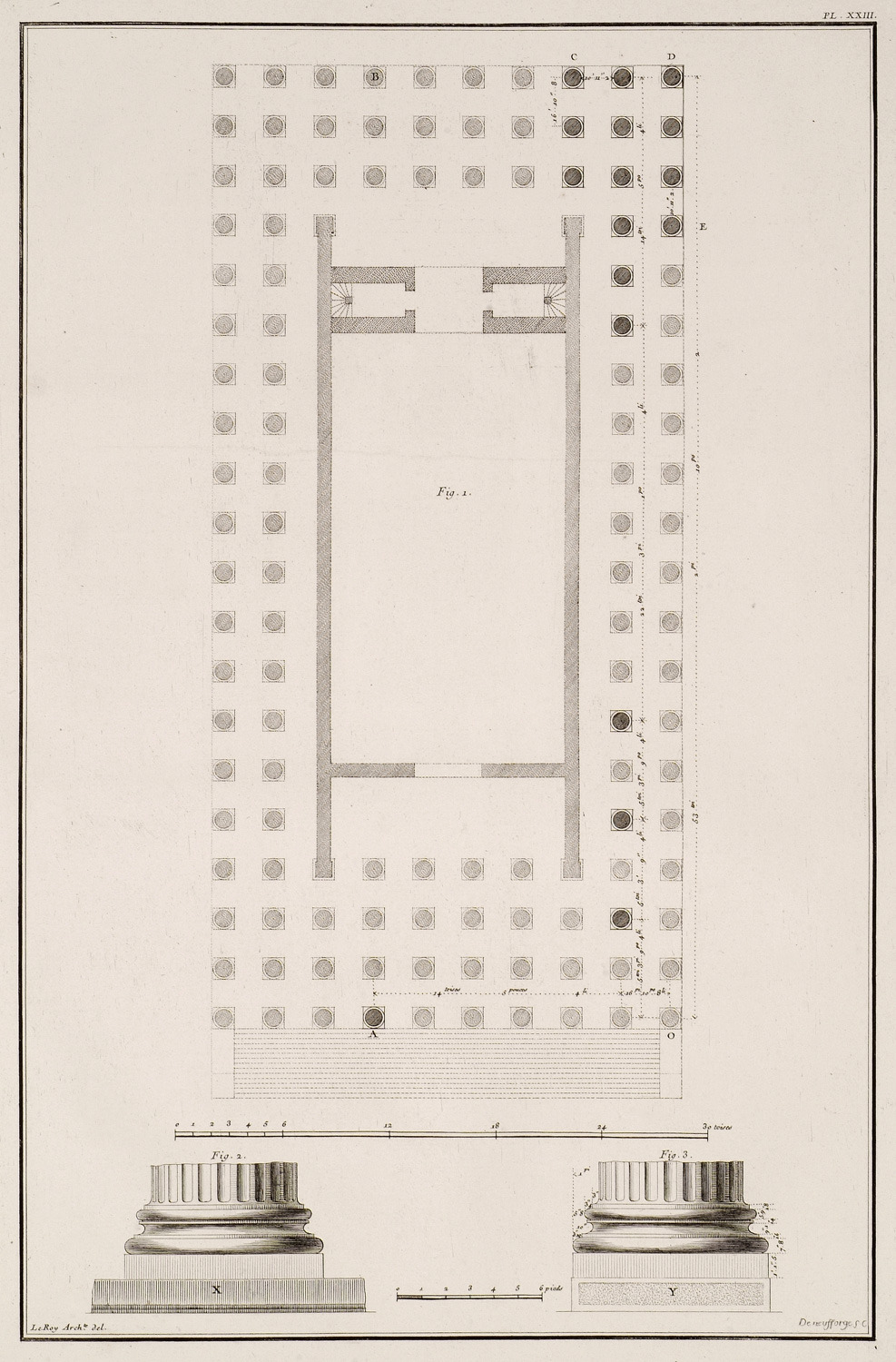
Temple plan

In 124–125 AD, when the Philhellene Hadrian visited Athens, a massive building programme was begun that included the completion of the Temple of Olympian Zeus. A walled marble-paved precinct was constructed around the temple, making it a central focus of the ancient city. Cossutius' design was used with few changes and the temple was formally dedicated by Hadrian in 132, who took the title of "Panhellenios" in commemoration of the occasion. The temple and the surrounding precinct were adorned with numerous statues depicting Hadrian, the gods, and personifications of the Roman provinces. A colossal statue of Hadrian was raised behind the building by the people of Athens in honor of the emperor's generosity. An equally colossal chryselephantine statue of Zeus occupied the cella of the temple. The statue's form of construction was unusual, as the use of chryselephantine was by this time regarded as archaic. Hadrian may have been imitating Phidias' famous statue of Athena Parthenos in the Parthenon, seeking to draw attention to the temple and himself by doing so.

Pausanias describes the temple as it was in the 2nd century:

Before the entrance to the sanctuary of Zeus Olympios [in Athens] – Hadrian the Roman emperor dedicated the temple and the statue, one worth seeing, which in size exceeds all other statues save the colossi at Rhodes and Rome, and is made of ivory and gold with an artistic skill which is remarkable when the size is taken into account – before the entrance, I say, stand statues of Hadrian, two of Thasian stone, two of Egyptian. Before the pillars stand bronze statues which the Athenians call ‘colonies.’ The whole circumference of the precincts is about four states, and they are full of statues; for every city has dedicated a likeness of the emperor Hadrian, and the Athenians have surpassed them in dedicating, behind the temple, the remarkable colossus. Within the precincts are antiquities: a bronze Zeus, a temple of Kronos and Rhea and an enclosure of Gaia (Earth) surnamed Olympias. Here the floor opens to the width of a cubit, and they say that along this bed flowed off the water after the deluge that occurred in the time of [the mythical king] Deukalion, and into it, they cast every year wheat meal mixed with honey. On a pillar is a statue of Isokrates . . . There are also statues in Phrygian marble of Persians supporting a bronze tripod; both the figures and the tripod are worth seeing. The ancient sanctuary of Zeus Olympios the Athenians say was built by Deukalion, and they cite as evidence that Deukalion lived at Athens a grave which is not far from the present temple. Hadrian constructed other buildings also for the Athenians: a temple of Hera and Zeus Panellenios (Common to all Greeks).

The temple was badly damaged during the sack of Athens by the Heruli in 267 AD. It is unlikely to have been repaired, given the extent of the damage to the rest of the city and was completely destroyed by an earthquake in the 5th century. Material from the ruined building was incorporated into a basilica constructed nearby during the 5th or 6th century.

=== Medieval and modern periods ===
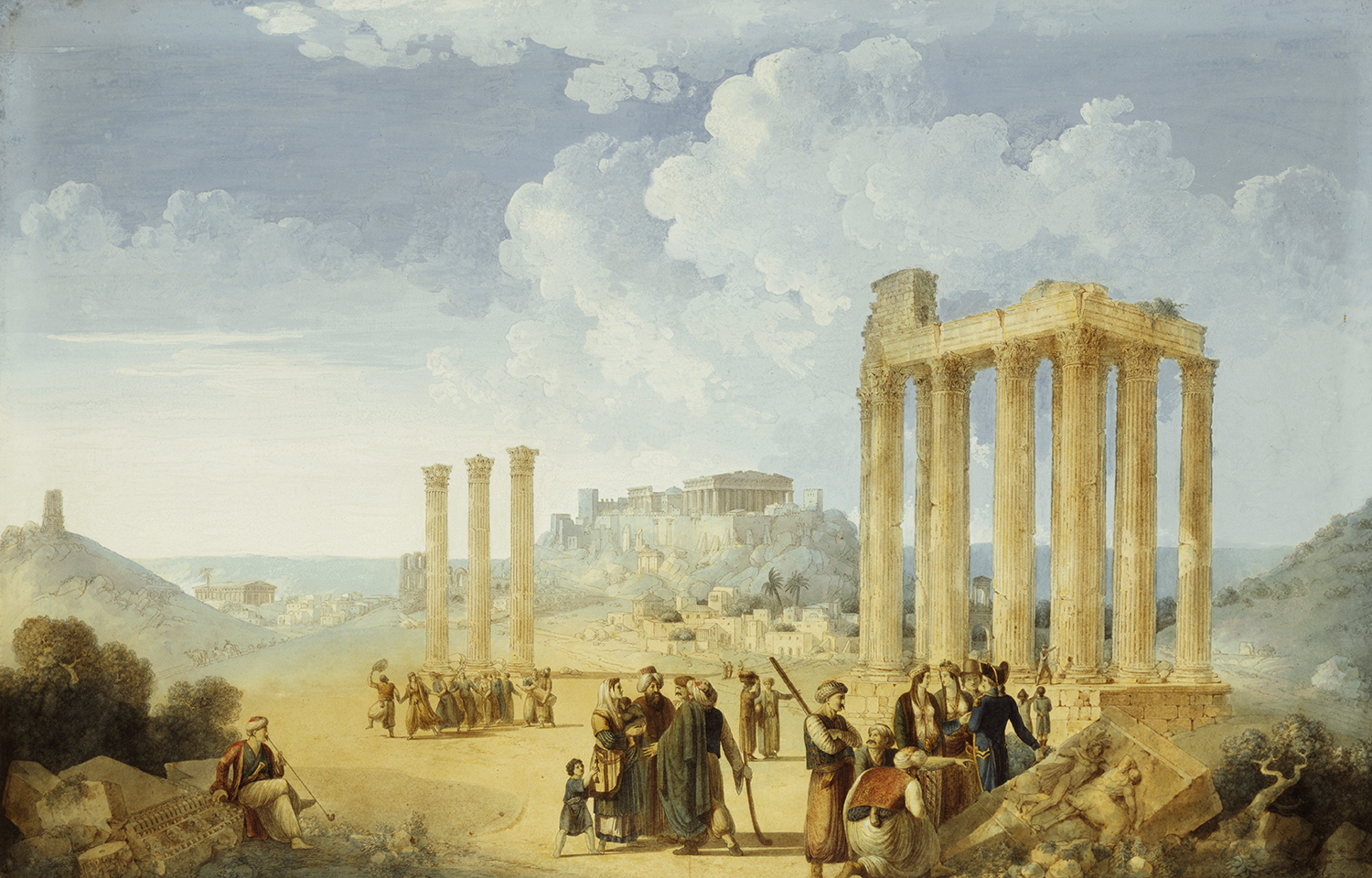
The temple in 1787, painted by Louis-François Cassas

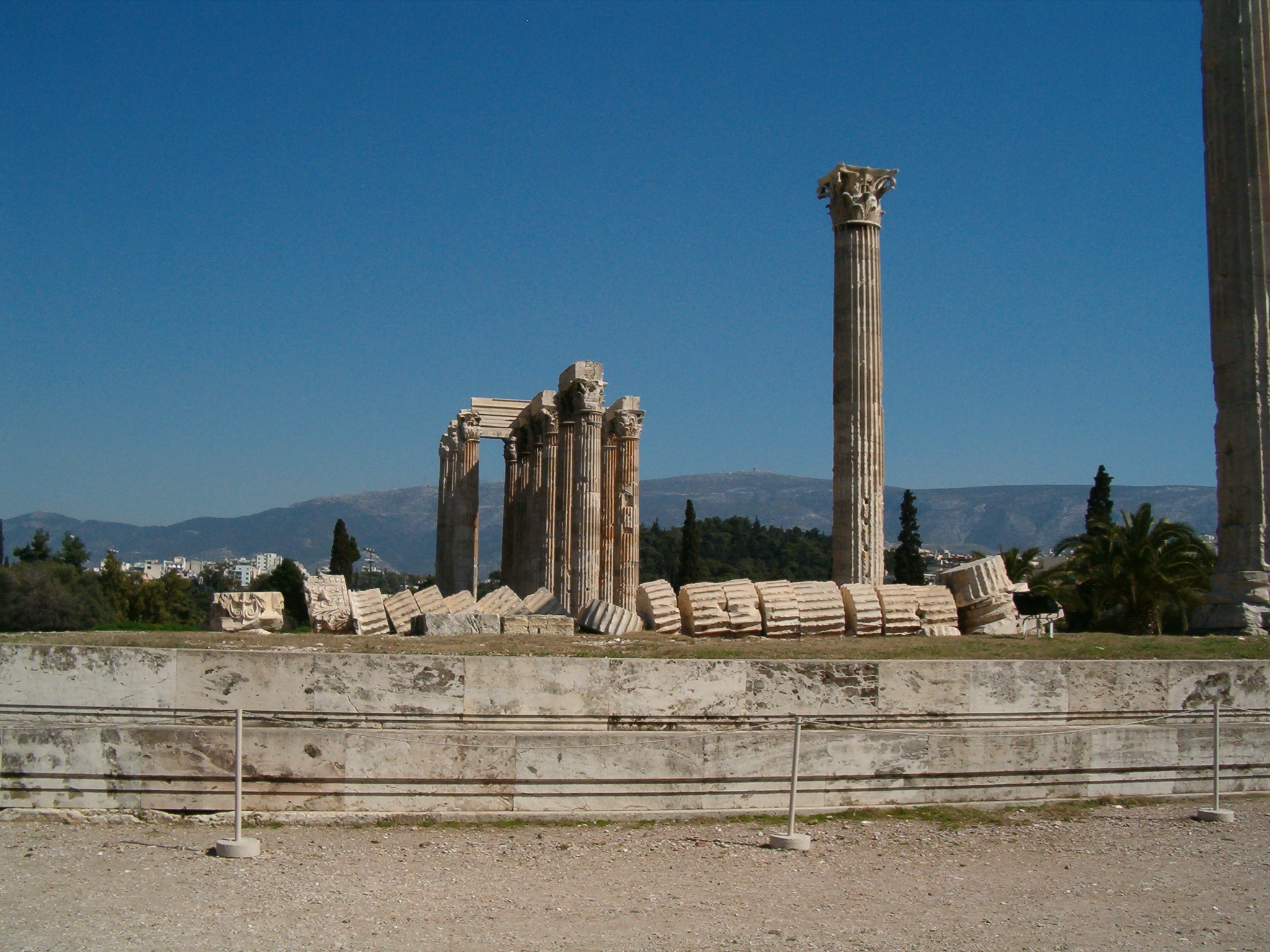
Ruins and a column that collapsed in 1852 from a fierce wind, in the foreground

Over the following centuries, the temple was systematically quarried to provide building materials and material for the houses and churches of medieval Athens. By the end of the Byzantine period, it had been almost totally destroyed; when Ciriaco de' Pizzicolli (Cyriacus of Ancona) visited Athens in 1436 he found only 21 of the original 104 columns still standing and did a drawing of the monument (Manuscript Hamilton 254, folio 87v).

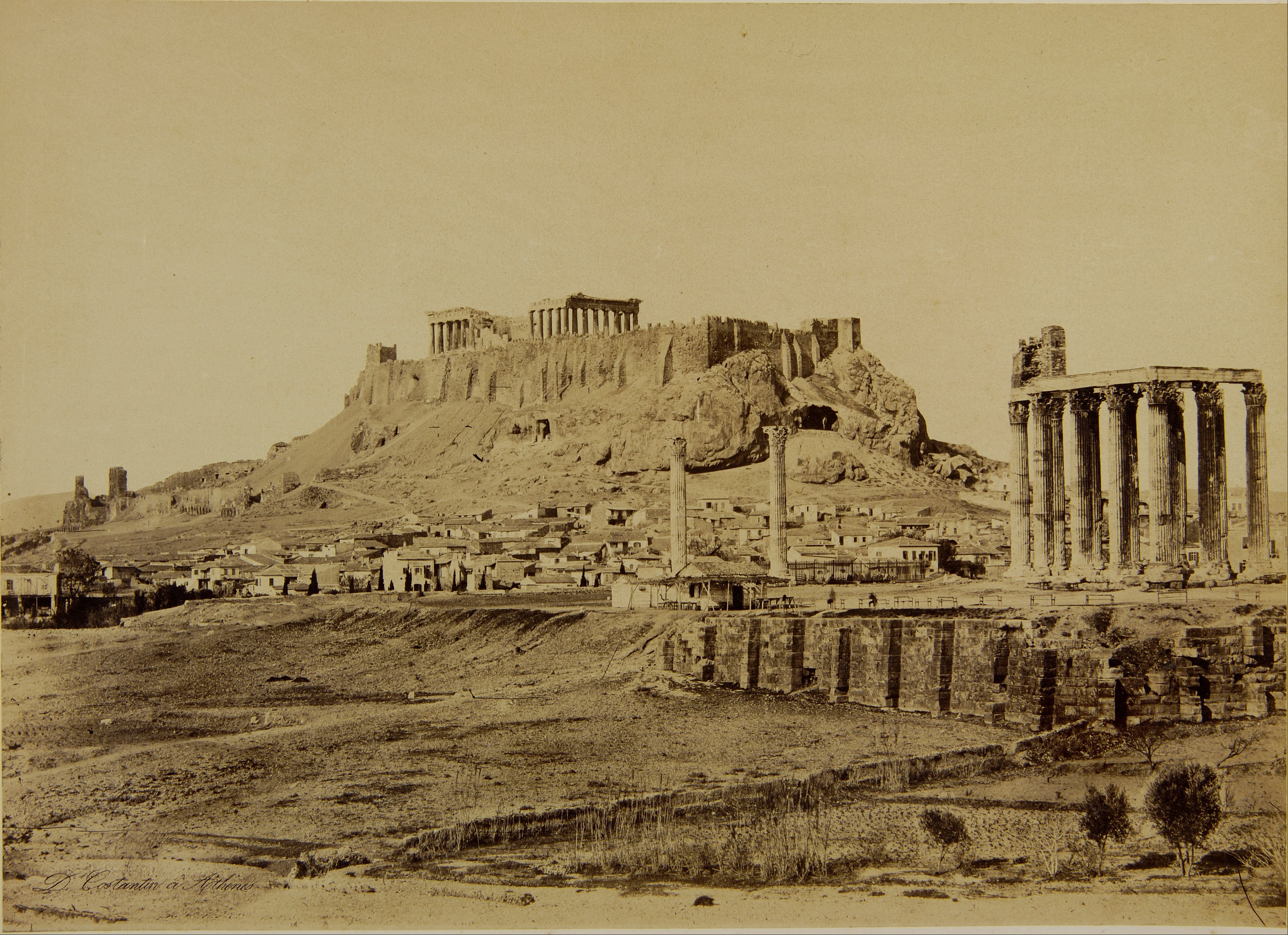
This photograph of 1865 by Constantinou Dimitrios shows above the last two columns of the main group, a small stone structure in which had lived an ascetic or Stylite

The fate of one of the columns is recorded by a Greek inscription on one of the surviving columns, which states that "on 27 April 1759 he pulled down the column". This refers to the Turkish governor of Athens, Mustapha Agha Tzistarakis, who is recorded by a chronicler as having "destroyed one of Hadrian's columns with gunpowder" in order to re-use the marble to make plaster for the Tzistarakis Mosque that he was building in the Monastiraki district of the city. During the Ottoman period the temple was known to the Greeks as the Palace of Hadrian, while the Turks called it the Palace of Belkis, from a Turkish legend that the temple had been the residence of Solomon's wife.

Fifteen columns remain standing today and a sixteenth column lies on the ground where it fell during a storm in 1852. Nothing remains of the cella or the great statue that it once housed.

=== Excavations ===
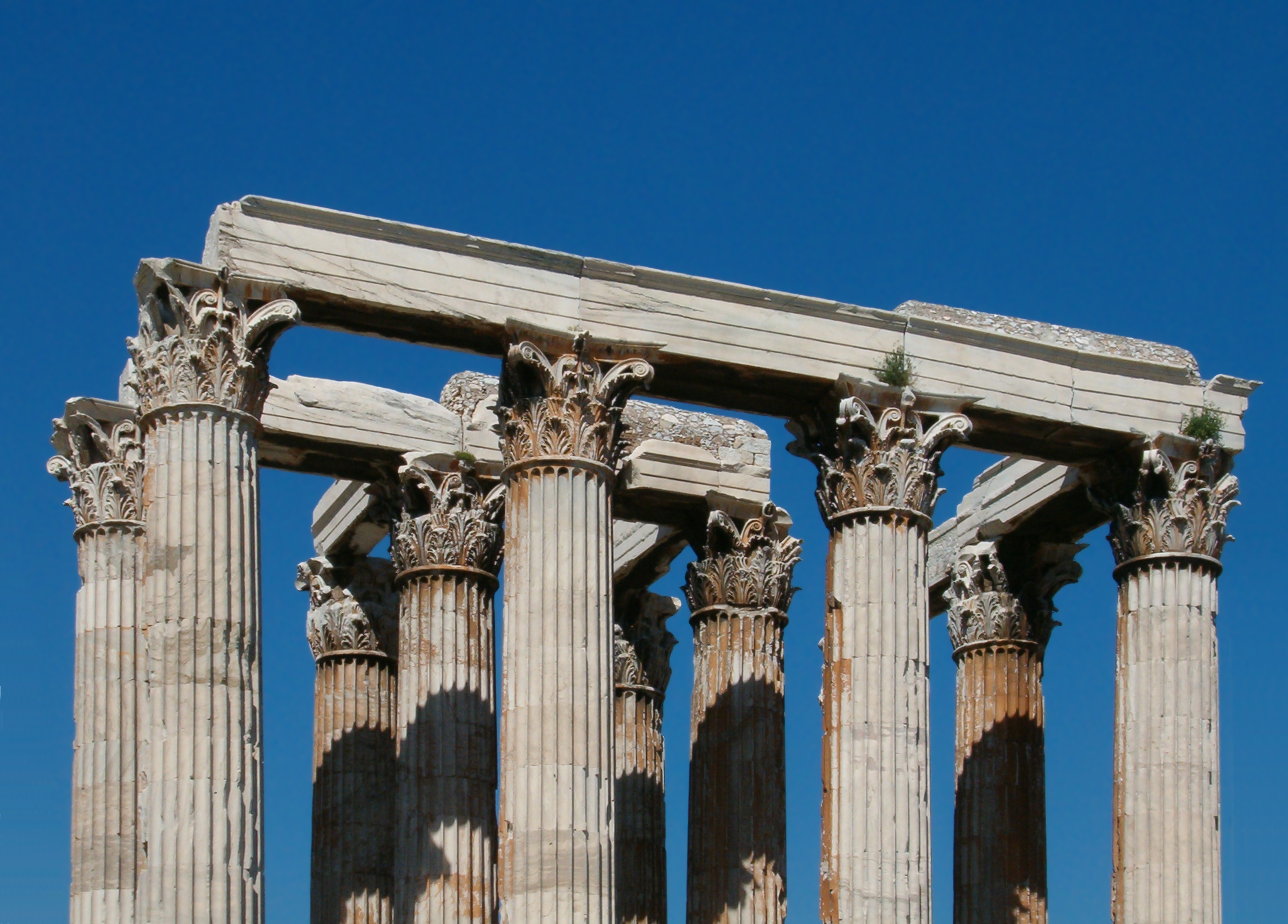
The entablature

The earliest documented modern archaeological investigations in the area of the Olympieion date to 1886, when Stephanos Koumanoudes excavated the sector north of the peribolos; in the following year Francis Penrose carried out a brief excavation directly around the temple, in the first known archaeological intervention there by the British School at Athens, with the aim of clarifying its architectural layout. In the historical overview by John Travlos, the excavation campaigns at the Olympieion between 1886 and 1907 are counted among the digs that made possible the first scientific reconstruction of the topography of Athens. The study of the sanctuary's earliest phases was later advanced decisively by Penrose and Gabriel Welter: Penrose identified key elements of the temple predating the later monumental structure, while Welter further investigated the foundations and published a brief report in 1923.

A major resumption of investigations took place in 1956, when John Travlos excavated the area north of the peribolos and identified additional stretches of a structure that he attributed to the Themistoclean Wall. In the same sector, within a small strip of ground left untouched by the nineteenth-century excavations, a ceramic sequence dating from the last quarter of the eighth century BC to the second quarter of the sixth century BC came to light; Eva Brann interpreted it as ceremonial pottery and probably as the residue of an Archaic necropolis laid out along a road that also passed beneath the later Arch of Hadrian. Travlos's investigations also led to the discovery, in 1959, of a marble relief north of the enclosure, later discussed by Evelyn Harrison, and to the identification, at regular intervals around the Olympieion, of the bases of the statues of Hadrian known from the epigraphic and literary evidence of the imperial period.

Further campaigns were conducted by Travlos in 1961, bringing to light very early remains that he interpreted as archaeological confirmation of the passage in Thucydides concerning the earliest settlement on the southern slope of the Acropolis, together with important buildings of the Classical and Roman periods. Excavation and survey in the surrounding area have also made it possible to identify, immediately north of the sanctuary, the foundations of a Classical temple identified with the sanctuary of Apollo Delphinios, a small Roman-period Doric peripteral temple identified with the Kronion, and, further to the south-west, the remains of a large rectangular peristyle and the foundations of a small temple identified with the Panhellenion.

=== Modern history ===
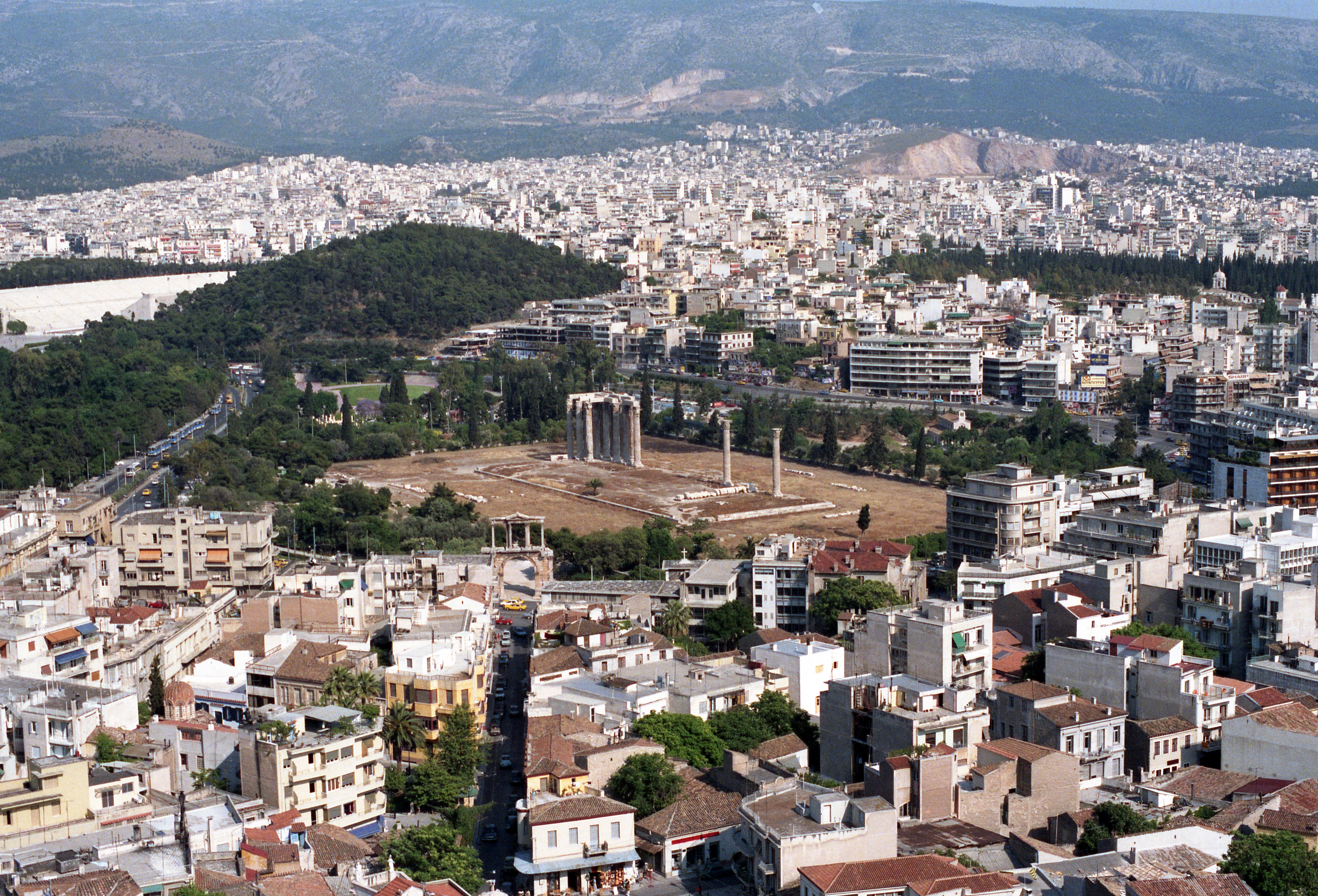
The temple amidst the modern city of Athens

Today, the temple forms part of the unified archaeological sites of Athens and is protected and supervised by the Ephorate of Antiquities. In the modern period it has occasionally been used for public cultural and religious events. On 28 June 2001, Vangelis staged the Mythodea concert at the site in connection with NASA's 2001 Mars Odyssey mission. On 21 January 2007, members of the group Ellinais held a ceremony at the temple in honour of Zeus.

== Description ==
In its Hadrianic form, the temple stood at the centre of a large open area measuring 250 x 130 m and was enclosed within a rectangular poros precinct measuring 205.85 x 128.72 m, reinforced with engaged piers and accessible through a small propylon on the north side. The building measured 110.35 m in length and 43.68 m in width and was of the Corinthian order. Along the long sides it had a double row of twenty columns, while on the short sides it had three rows of eight columns, for a total of 104 columns, each 17.25 m high and 1.70 m in lower diameter. The cella housed a chryselephantine statue of Zeus and a statue of Hadrian, who was honoured alongside the god.

For the Archaic project, known chiefly through its foundations and reused material, Wycherley instead proposed a building measuring 107.7 x 42.9 m, probably with eight columns on the front and twenty-one on the flanks. The foundations must have been deeper towards the south and west, while the inner columns of the peristasis had individual foundations. In modern scholarship this phase is generally regarded as Doric, not Ionic, although it employed a dipteral plan recalling the great models of Asia Minor. The internal arrangement of Pisistratus' project nevertheless remains largely conjectural.

Sixteen columns of the structure survive today, but only fifteen remain standing: thirteen at the south-east corner and three near the south-west corner, of which the central one collapsed during a storm in 1852 and was left where it fell. The Hadrianic arrangement also monumentalised the outer enclosure, along which modern excavations have identified, at regular intervals, the bases of the statues of Hadrian known from epigraphic and literary sources. At the north-west corner of the enclosure still stands the Arch of Hadrian.

== See also ==
- List of Ancient Greek temples
- Architecture of Ancient Greece

== Bibliography ==
- Benjamin, Anna S. (1963). "The Altars of Hadrian in Athens and Hadrian's Panhellenic Program" (PDF). Hesperia. 32 (1): 57–86.
- Boese, Helmut (1966). "Ham. 254". Die lateinischen Handschriften der Sammlung Hamilton zu Berlin (in German). Wiesbaden: Otto Harrassowitz. pp. 125–130.
- Brann, Eva (1959). "Seventh Century Sherds from the Olympieion Area" (PDF). Hesperia. 28 (3): 251–252.
- Darling, Janina K. (2004). Architecture of Greece. Greenwood Press. pp. 201–203. ISBN 978-0-3133-2152-8.
- Harrison, Evelyn B. (2000). "Eumolpos Arrives in Eleusis" (PDF). Hesperia. 69 (3): 267–291. doi:10.2307/148398.
- Hoff, Michael C. (1989). "Civil Disobedience and Unrest in Augustan Athens" (PDF). Hesperia. 58 (3): 267–276.
- Tölle-Kastenbein, R. (1994). Das Olympieion in Athen (in German). Köln: Böhlau.
- Travlos, John (1981). "Athens after the Liberation: Planning the New City and Exploring the Old" (PDF). Hesperia. 50 (4): 391–407.
- Wycherley, R. E. (1964). "The Olympieion at Athens". Greek, Roman and Byzantine Studies. 5 (3): 161–179.
