= Poems by Julius Caesar =

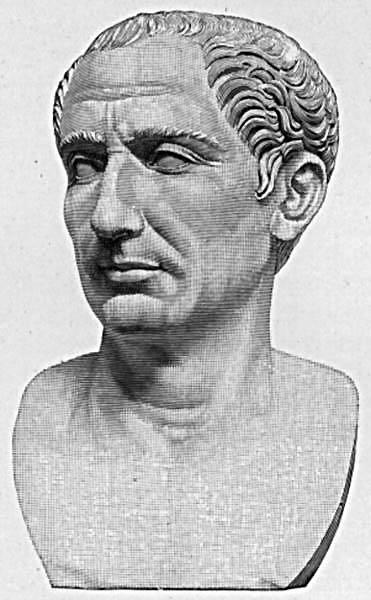
Julius Caesar

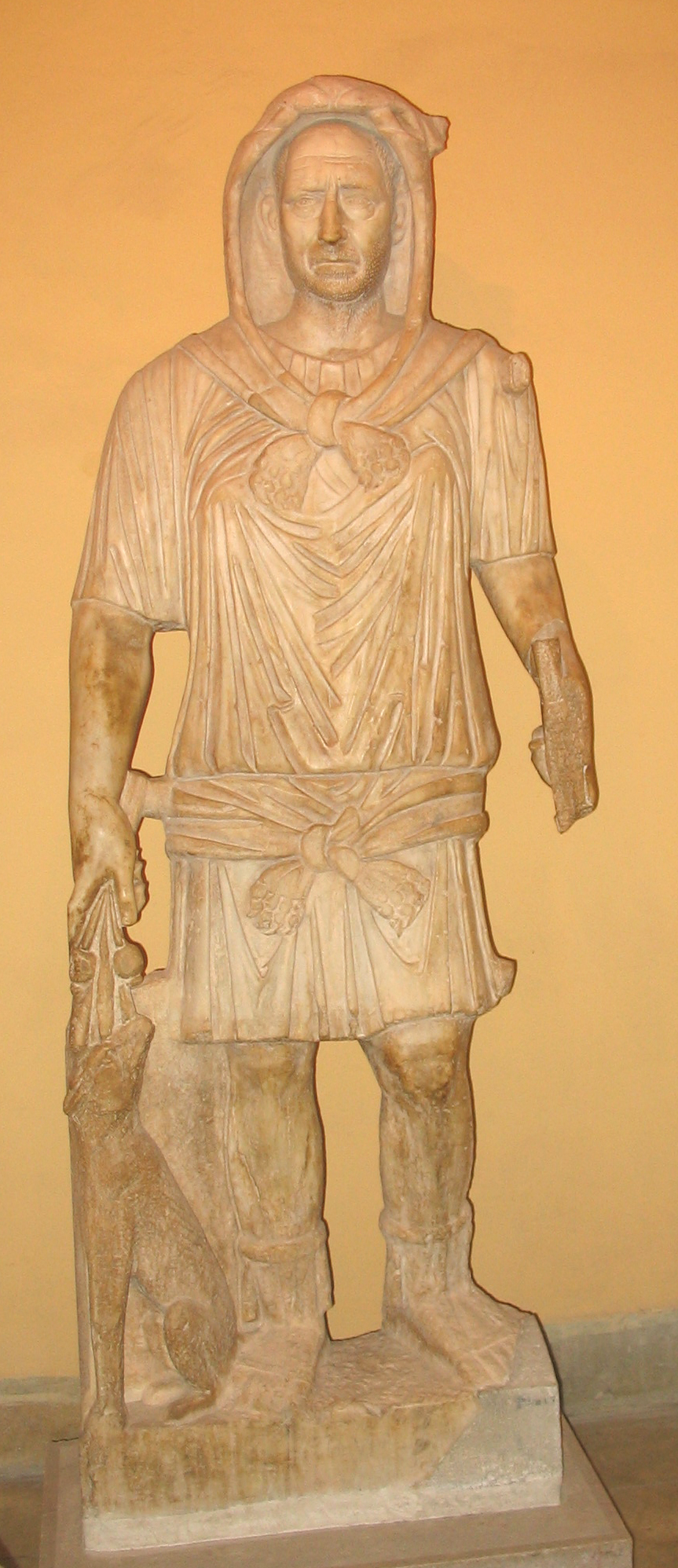
The Roman face of Hercules, about whom the young Caesar wrote a poem

Poems by Julius Caesar are mentioned by several sources in antiquity. None are extant.

Plutarch says that verse compositions were among the entertainments Caesar offered the Cilician pirates who captured him as a young man in 75 BC. Pliny places "the divine Julius" on his list of serious men who wrote not-so-serious poems. Caesar's Dicta Collectanea, a collection of his memorable quotations, is assumed to have contained quotations from his verse as well as prose works.

The titles of two works Caesar wrote as a young man are known, a Laudes Herculis ("Praises of Hercules") and the verse tragedy Oedipus; their planned publication by the librarian Pompeius Macer was squelched by a "short and simple" — or perhaps "curt and direct" — letter from Caesar's heir Augustus as incompatible with his program of deification. A third title, Iter ("The Journey"), dates from 46 BC, composed during a 24-day trip from Rome to Spain during the civil war. This verse travelogue may have been modeled after Lucilius's poem about a trip to Sicily. Caesar's choice of writing as a pastime in prelude to the decisive and brutal Battle of Munda illustrates the dual preoccupations of the Late Republican aristocrat, with militarism and political power-plays balanced by elite intellectual and aesthetic aspirations.

== Surviving texts ==
A single incomplete line survives that might come from the Iter, quoted by Isidore of Seville in discussing the word unguentum, "ointment":

Certain unguents, however, are referred to by place of origin. An example is telinum, as Julius Caesar notes when he says 'We lubricate our bodies with soothing telinum.' This was concocted on the island of Telos, which is one of the Cyclades.

The quoted phrase corpusque suaui telino unguimus is part of a scazon or iambic trimeter. Its author has also been identified as C. Iulius Caesar Strabo, the dictator's uncle.

In his Life of Terence, Suetonius preserves six lines of dactylic hexameter by Caesar praising the Roman playwright, along with a more lukewarm assessment by Cicero. These two verse passages, with their similarity of purpose and wording, may have resulted from a school assignment, since both men studied with the teacher and grammarian Gnipho. As such, Caesar's lines are probably not to be taken too seriously as literary criticism, but his notice of Terence as "lover of a pure conversational style" points toward Caesar's own stylistic predilections and linguistic nationalism.

== Reception ==
Tacitus considered their loss a happy accident for the dictator's literary reputation:

For Caesar and Brutus wrote poems, and put them in their friends' libraries too. They were no better than Cicero, but have been more lucky, for their poetry is less known.

== Bibliography ==
- Courtney, Edward. The Fragmentary Latin Poets. Oxford: Clarendon Press, 1993.
