= Cossutia =

Roman woman who was engaged to Julius Caesar

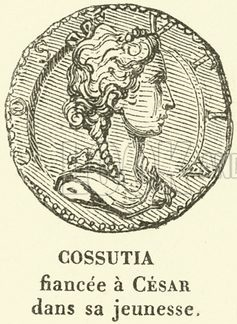
- Cossutia, fiancée of Julius Caesar
- Born: Rome
- Died: As early as 84 BC; Possibly in Pisa
- Known for: Possibly being the first wife of Julius Caesar
- Spouse: Julius Caesar (disputed)

Cossutia was a Roman woman who became engaged to Julius Caesar prior to his reaching adulthood. There has been debate among historians on whether the marriage actually occurred.

== Biography ==
=== Early life ===
Cossutia belonged to a very wealthy equestrian family from Pisa.

=== Caesar ===
Cossutia appealed to Caesar, although the Cossuti were not even novi homines. She was recommended to Caesar by his father and it is believed that the future dictator of Rome married Cossutia after he began wearing the toga virilis. Both families issued coins with her image and were inscribed with Uxor Caesaris. No children sprang from this relation. In 84 BC, after his father's death, Caesar left Cossutia and married Cornelia, as that was more pragmatic than the earlier relation to Cossutia. It is also possible that Caesar chose to leave her to marry Cornelia because he had been nominated as Flamen Dialis, a role which demanded marriage to a patrician via confarreatio.

=== Later years ===
Cossutia perhaps died in Pisa, Italy in 84 BC.

== Scholarly disagreement ==
In the past it was commonly accepted that Caesar and Cossutia were married, but more recent opinions differ. Among those arguing that Caesar was never married to Cossutia are Ludwig Friedrich Otto Baumgarten-Crusius, Napoleon III, Charles Merivale, James Anthony Froude, Theodore Ayrault Dodge, William Warde Fowler, Ernest Gottlieb Sihler, Adolf von Mess, and John Carew Rolfe. The French author Marie-Nicolas Bouillet lists Cossutia first, then Cornelia, Pompeia, and Calpurnia, as wives of Caesar. The ancient historian Plutarch largely ignores Cossutia, but names her as one of Caesar's wives. Suetonius also used the word for an official divorce when describing the separation.

== Cultural depictions ==
Cossutia appears as a major character in the opera Young Caesar, and as a minor character in several novels. A character named Cossutia appears in the television series Spartacus: House of Ashur, portrayed by Claudia Black.

== See also ==
- List of Roman gentes
- Plebs
