= Richard Ernest Wycherley =

British classical archaeologist (1909–1986)

- Born: 18 February 1909
- Died: 26 April 1986 (aged 77)
- Occupation: Archaeologist

Richard Ernest Wycherley (18 February 1909 – 26 April 1986), was a British classical archaeologist, specialising in ancient Greece. He attended Queens' College at the University of Cambridge, attaining a bachelor's degree in 1930 and a diploma in classical archaeology in 1931. He was Assistant Lecturer for Classics at the University of Manchester from 1932 to 1937 and later Lecturer until 1945. He was emeritus Professor of Greek at the University of Wales.

He was the author of the Companion Volume to the Loeb Edition of Pausanias, Description of Greece; How the Greeks Built Cities; The Athenian Agora III, Literary and Epigraphical Testimonia and The Stones of Athens. He was also co-author with Homer Thompson of The Athenian Agora XIV, The History, Shape and Uses of an Ancient City Center.

== Publications ==
- The Stones of Athens, Princeton University Press, 1978.
- How the Greeks built cities, Macmillan, 1976.
- The Agora of Athens: The History, Shape, and Uses of an Ancient City Center with Homer Thompson, American School of Classical Studies at Athens, 1972.
- Athenian Agora III, Literary and Epigraphical Testimonia, American School of Classical Studies at Athens, 1957.
