= Cornelia (wife of Caesar) =

Wife of Julius Caesar (c. 97 – c. 69 BC)

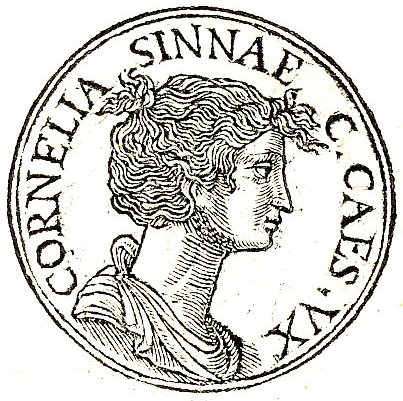
- Cornelia from Promptuarii Iconum Insigniorum, with the inscription cornelia sinnae [filia] c[ai] caes[aris] vx[or], or "Cornelia, Cinna's [daughter], G[aius] Caes[ar's] wife
- Born: c. 97 BC; Rome
- Died: c. 69 BC (aged about 28); Rome
- Known for: The first or second wife of Julius Caesar
- Spouse(s): Julius Caesar (84–69 BC; her death)
- Children: Julia (76–54 BC)
- Parents: Lucius Cornelius Cinna (father); Annia (mother)

Cornelia (c. 97 – c. 69 BC) was either the first or second wife of Julius Caesar, (Note: Plutarch refers to Pompeia, Cornelia's successor, as Caesar's third wife, implying that Cornelia was his second, and that Cossutia, to whom he had been betrothed as a child, was his first.) and the mother of his only legitimate child, Julia. A daughter of Lucius Cornelius Cinna, Cornelia was related by birth or marriage to many of the most influential figures of the late Republic.

== Biography ==
=== Early life ===
Cornelia was the daughter of Lucius Cornelius Cinna, one of the most influential politicians at Rome during the conflict between the generals Gaius Marius and Lucius Cornelius Sulla.

By his wife, Annia, Cinna had two daughters, conventionally known as Cornelia Major, who married Gnaeus Domitius Ahenobarbus, and Cornelia Minor, the wife of Caesar. The designations Major and Minor were not really part of their names, but were used to distinguish between sisters, who bore the same nomen. Since there were a great many Corneliae at Rome, Caesar's wife is occasionally referred to as Cornelia Cinnae, or "Cinna's Cornelia".

=== Marriage ===
Suetonius reports that Caesar and Cornelia were married in the consulate occurring after Caesar lost his father, which occurred in his sixteenth year. In Suetonius' chronology, Caesar was born in 100 BC, placing the death of his father in 85 or 84. Thus, he probably married Cornelia in 83, when he was about seventeen years old, and she perhaps a little younger. (Note: Although 100 BC is still conventionally given as the year of Caesar's birth, some historians place it in 102, which would have made him about nineteen. Goldsworthy places the marriage before Cinna's death in 84.) Their daughter, Julia, was Caesar's only legitimate child, and the only one he acknowledged. (Note: It is generally supposed that Caesar was the father of Caesarion, the son of Cleopatra, who was born in 47 BC, although Caesar never openly acknowledged the relationship. In his will, Caesar adopted his grandnephew, Gaius Octavius.)

The young Caesar was one of those to whom Sulla turned his attention after returning to Rome. Although he had taken no part in the government of Marius and Cinna, and done nothing to oppose Sulla's return, Caesar's aunt, Julia, was the wife of Marius; his cousin was the younger Marius, who as consul in 82 was defeated by Sulla, and had taken his own life as the city fell. Marius and Cinna had appointed the young Caesar to an important priesthood, and by marrying Cinna's daughter, Caesar gained control of a substantial dowry. Sulla regarded Caesar as a potential rival, and commanded him to divorce Cornelia.

However, neither the deprivation of his priesthood, Cornelia's dowry, and his own inheritance, nor the threat of violence, would induce Caesar to forsake his wife. He was proscribed, and escaped Rome in disguise, evading capture by regularly changing his place of concealment, and on at least one occasion by bribing the commander of a patrol sent to search for Sulla's enemies. Eventually Sulla relented, following the intercession of Caesar's numerous friends and kinsmen, and Caesar returned home to Cornelia.

=== Death ===
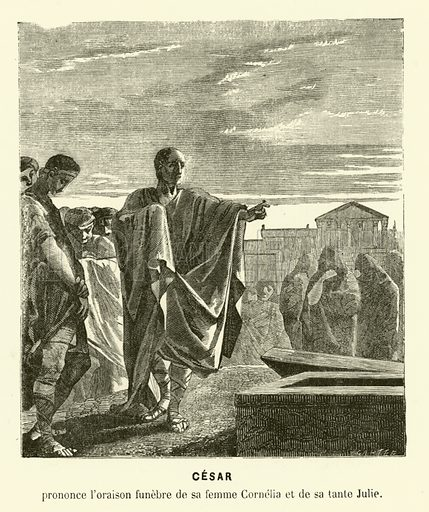
Caesar delivers a funeral oration for Julia and Cornelia (Henri de Montaut, 1868)

After about thirteen years of marriage, Cornelia died early in her husband's quaestorship, which occurred in BC 69 or 68. (Note: Usually dated to 68, Broughton provides a strong argument for why Caesar's quaestorship probably occurred in the preceding year.) Caesar was due to depart for Spain, and had already pronounced the funeral oration of his aunt, Julia, from the rostra, as was customary for elderly Roman matrons. He then gave an oration in honour of Cornelia, which was extraordinary in the case of a young woman, although it later became commonplace. Historically, Cornelia is often stated to have died in childbirth, but this is not confirmed.

== Bibliography ==
- Marcus Velleius Paterculus, Compendium of Roman History.
- Plutarchus, Lives of the Noble Greeks and Romans.
- Gaius Suetonius Tranquillus, De Vita Caesarum (Lives of the Caesars, or The Twelve Caesars).
- Dictionary of Greek and Roman Biography and Mythology, William Smith, ed., Little, Brown and Company, Boston (1849).
- Monroe E. Deutsch, "The Women of Caesar's Family", in The Classical Journal, vol. XIII (1918).
- T. Robert S. Broughton, The Magistrates of the Roman Republic, American Philological Association (1952).
- Matthias Gelzer, Caesar: Politician and Statesman, Peter Needham, translator, Oxford (1968).
- Adrian Goldsworthy, Caesar, Life of a Colossus, Yale University Press (2006).
- Oxford Classical Dictionary, 3rd Edition, Simon Hornblower and Anthony Spawforth, Eds., Oxford University Press (2009).
