= Glanville Downey =

American historian (1908–1991)

Robert Emory Glanville Downey (June 14, 1908 — December 18, 1991) was an American historian, specializing in history of Late antiquity, primarily in the early Byzantine East and the era of Justinian.

== Biography ==
He was born in Baltimore, Maryland in 1908. For many years he was Professor of History and Classical Philology at Indiana University in Bloomington, worked at Princeton University, and in the 1940s was actively involved in archaeological research in Istanbul (excavation of the Church of the Apostles). In 1956 he was awarded the Guggenheim Fellowship. Downey made a most significant contribution to the study of the early Byzantine cities of Antioch and Gaza in Palestine. The problems of the history of the individual cities of Early Byzantium are among the most important in modern Byzantine studies. Apart from archaeological research, we deal here with the economic activities of the inhabitants, social strata and relations between them, municipal self-government, and ethno-confessional relations. One of the most striking cities in this respect is Gaza, Palestine. He died on December 18, 1991, in Sacramento, California.

== Works ==
=== Books ===
- Downey, G. (1955). "Constantine the Rhodian: His Life and Writings". In Weitzmann, Kurt (ed.). Late Classical and Mediaeval Studies in Honor of Albert Mathias Friend. Princeton University Press. pp. 211–222. OCLC 879196.
- Belisarius, Young General of Byzantium. New York: E.P. Dutton. 1960.
- A history of Antioch in Syria: from Seleucus to the Arab conquest. Princeton University Press. 1961.
- Antioch in the age of Theodosius the Great. Norman: University of Oklahoma Press. 1962.
- Aristotle, Dean of Early Science. New York: Franklin Watts. 1962.
- Ancient Antioch. Princeton University. 1963.
- Gaza in the early sixth century. Norman: University of Oklahoma Press. 1963.
- Stories from Herodotus; a panorama of events and peoples of the ancient world. E. P. Dutton & Company. 1965.
- The late Roman Empire (2nd ed.). New York: Krieger Pub Co. 1969.
- Constantinople in the age of Justinian. Norman: University of Oklahoma Press. 1981.

=== Selected articles ===
- Downey, Glanville (1953). "The Persian Campaign in Syria in A. D. 540". Speculum. 28 (2): 340–348. doi:10.1515/9783110955125.177. JSTOR 2849692.
- Downey, G. (1938). "Imperial Building Records in Malalas". Byzantinische Zeitschrift. 38: 1–15 & 299–311. doi:10.1515/byzs.1938.38.1.1. S2CID 194088099.

=== Translations ===
- John Malalas (1940). Downey, G. (ed.). Chronicle of John Malalas, books VIII—XVIII. University of Chicago Press.
- Procopius (1940). Downey, G.; Dewing, Henry B. (eds.). Buildings of Justinian. Loeb Classical Library. Cambridge, MA: Harvard University Press.
