= Pergola (disambiguation) =

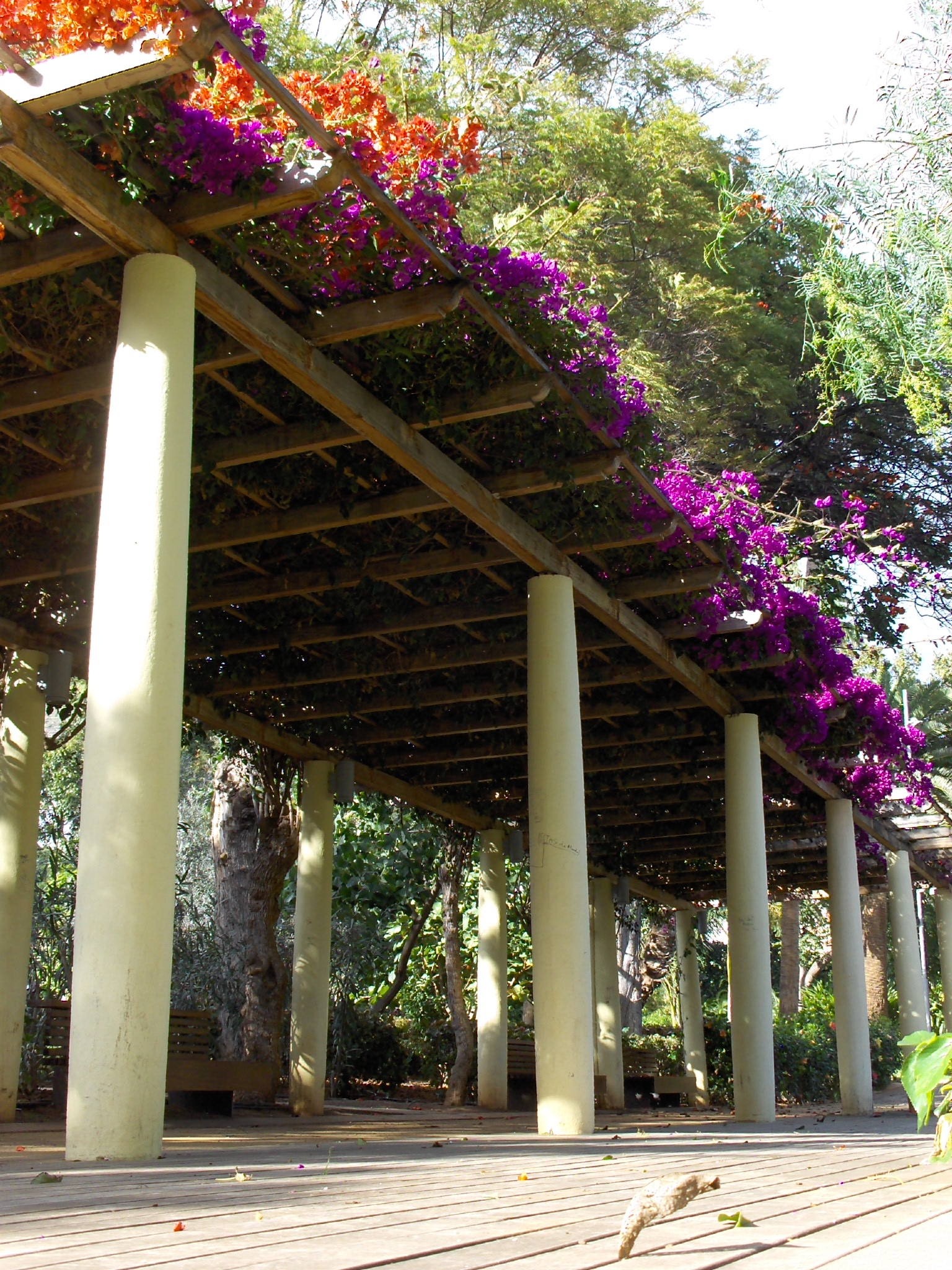
A pergola in the literal sense.

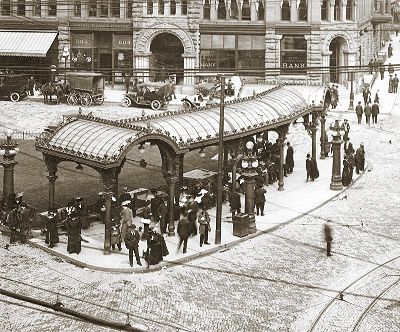
Pergola in Seattle's Pioneer Square

A pergola is a type of garden feature. It can also refer to a structure that resembles a garden pergola as, for example, the "pergola" in Seattle's Pioneer Square.

Pergola may also refer to:

== Places in Italy ==
- Pergola, Marche, a town and comune in the Province of Pesaro e Urbino
  - Diocese of Cagli e Pergola, diocese in Italy 1819–1986
  - Roman Catholic Diocese of Fano-Fossombrone-Cagli-Pergola, diocese in Italy from 1986
- Teatro della Pergola, opera house in Florence

== People ==
- Antonio Mario La Pergola (1931–2007), Italian judge
- Paolo da Pergola (d. 1455), Italian humanist philosopher
- Vinnie Pergola (born 1989), American TV actor

== Viticulture ==
- Pergola (vine system)

== Other ==
- Pergola (album), 2001 album by the band Johan
- The Hill Garden and Pergola, Hampstead Heath, London, England
- Gilt Bronzes from Cartoceto di Pergola, Roman statues found in Cartoceto, a frazione of the comune of Pergola
- Della Pergola, Italian surname
