= Assassination of Julius Caesar =

44 BC murder in Rome

- Part of the Crisis of the Roman Republic
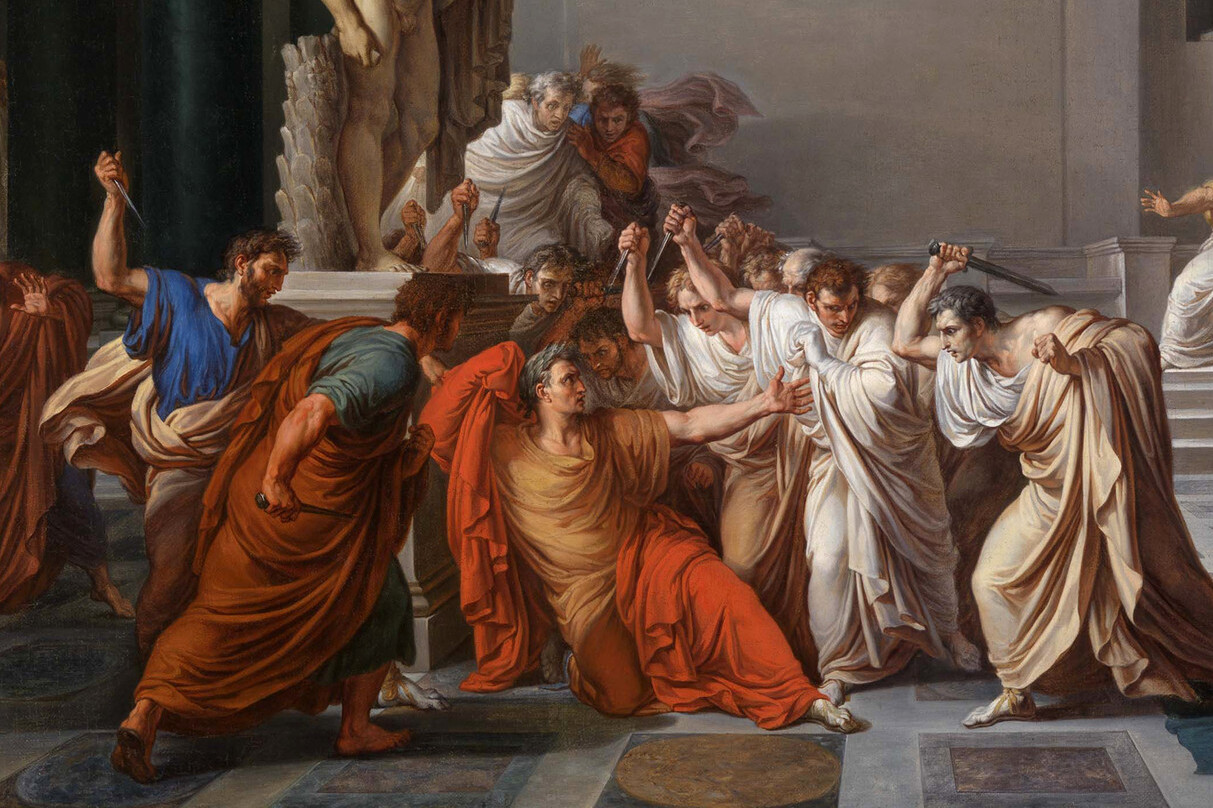
- The Death of Julius Caesar (1806)
- Location: 41°53′43″N 12°28′37″E; Curia of Pompey, Rome
- Date: 15 March 44 BC; 2069 years ago
- Attack type: Assassination by stabbing
- Perpetrators: 60 or more Roman senators
- Ringleaders: Marcus Junius Brutus; Gaius Cassius Longinus; Decimus Junius Brutus Albinus; Gaius Trebonius

Julius Caesar, the Roman dictator, was assassinated on the Ides of March (15 March), 44 BC, by a group of senators during a Senate session at the Curia of Pompey, located within the Theatre of Pompey in Rome. The conspirators, numbering 60 individuals and led by Marcus Junius Brutus, Gaius Cassius Longinus, and Decimus Junius Brutus Albinus, stabbed Caesar approximately 23 times. They justified the act as a defense of the Roman Republic, asserting that Caesar's accumulation of lifelong political authority—including his perpetual dictatorship and other honors—threatened republican traditions. The assassination failed to achieve its immediate objective of restoring the Republic's institutions. Instead, it precipitated Caesar's posthumous deification and was followed by the Liberators' civil war (43–42 BC) between his supporters and the conspirators, which became a stage in the collapse of the Republic. These events ultimately culminated in the rise of the Roman Empire under Augustus, marking the beginning of the Principate era.

== Causes ==
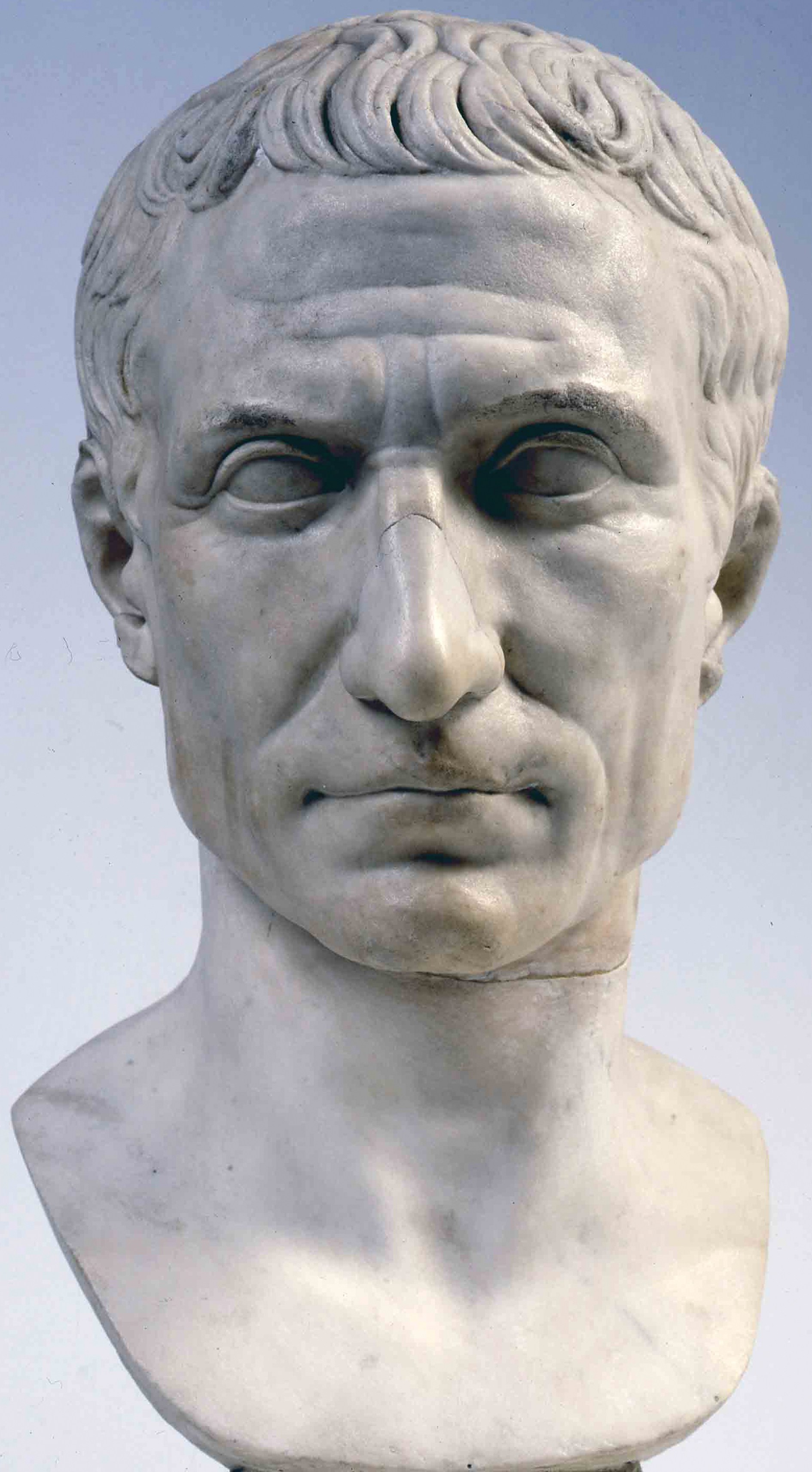
Possible bust of Julius Caesar, posthumous portrait in marble, 44–30 BC

Julius Caesar had served the Republic for eight years in the Gallic Wars, fully conquering the region of Gaul (roughly equivalent to modern-day France). After the Roman Senate demanded that Caesar disband his army and return home as a civilian, he refused, crossing the Rubicon with his army and plunging Rome into Caesar's civil war in 49 BC. After defeating the last of the opposition, Caesar was appointed dictator perpetuo ("dictator in perpetuity") in early 44 BC. Roman historian Titus Livius describes three incidents that occurred from 45 to 44 BC as the final causes of Caesar's assassination – the "three last straws" as far as some Romans were concerned.

The first incident took place in March 45 BC or possibly early 44 BC. According to Roman historian Cassius Dio, after the Senate had voted to bestow a large number of honors upon Caesar, they decided to present them to him formally, and marched as a senatorial delegation to the Temple of Venus Genetrix. When they arrived, etiquette called for Caesar to stand up to greet the senators, but he did not rise. He also joked about their news, saying that his honors needed to be cut back instead of increased. Roman historian Suetonius wrote (almost 150 years later) that Caesar failed to rise in the temple, either because he was restrained by Lucius Cornelius Balbus (the future consul) or that he balked at the suggestion he should rise. Regardless of the reasoning, by practically rejecting a senatorial gift and not acknowledging the delegation's presence with proper etiquette, Caesar gave the strong impression that he no longer cared about the Senate.

The second incident occurred in 44 BC. One day in January, Gaius Epidius Marullus and Lucius Caesetius Flavus (both tribunes) discovered a diadem on the head of the statue of Caesar on the Rostra in the Roman Forum. According to Suetonius, the tribunes ordered the wreath be removed as it was a symbol of Jupiter and royalty. Nobody knew who had placed the diadem, but Caesar suspected that the tribunes had arranged for it to appear so that they could have the honour of removing it. Matters escalated shortly after on the 26th, when Caesar was riding on horseback to Rome on the Appian Way. A few members of the crowd greeted him as rex ("king"), to which Caesar replied, "I am not Rex, but Caesar". This was wordplay; Rex was also a Roman name. Marullus and Flavus were not amused, and ordered the man who first cried "rex" arrested. In a later Senate meeting, Caesar accused the tribunes of attempting to create opposition to him, and had them removed from office and membership in the Senate. The Roman plebs took their tribunes seriously as the representatives of the common people; Caesar's actions against the tribunes put him on the wrong side of public opinion.

The third incident took place at the festival of the Lupercalia, on 15 February 44 BC. Mark Antony, who had been elected co-consul with Caesar, climbed onto the Rostra and placed a diadem on Caesar's head, saying "The People give this to you through me". While a few members of the crowd applauded, most responded with silence. Caesar removed the diadem from his head; Antony again placed it on him, only to get the same response from the crowd. Finally, Caesar put it aside to use as a sacrifice to Jupiter Optimus Maximus. Caesar said, "Jupiter alone of the Romans is king", which received an enthusiastic response from the crowd. At the time, many believed that Caesar's rejection of the diadem was a way for him to see if there was enough support for him to become king, and despised him for it.

According to Suetonius, Caesar's assassination ultimately occurred primarily due to concerns that he wished to crown himself the king of Rome. These concerns were exacerbated by the "three last straws" of 45 and 44 BC. In just a few months, Caesar had disrespected the Senate, removed People's Tribunes, and toyed with monarchy. By February, the conspiracy that caused his assassination was being born.

== Preceding events ==
Virgil wrote in the Georgics that several unusual events took place preceding Caesar's assassination:

Who dare say the Sun is false? He and no other warns us when dark uprising threaten, when treachery and hidden wars are gathering strength. He and no other was moved to pity Rome on the day that Caesar died, when he veiled his radiance in gloom and darkness, and a godless age feared everlasting night. Yet in this hour Earth also and the plains of Ocean, ill-boding dogs and birds that spell mischief, sent signs which heralded disaster. How oft before our eyes did Etna deluge the fields of the Cyclopes with a torrent from her burst furnaces, hurling thereon balls of fire and molten rocks. Germany heard the noise of battle sweep across the sky and, even without precedent, the Alps rocked with earthquakes. A voice boomed through the silent groves for all to hear, a deafening voice, and phantoms of unearthly pallor were seen in the falling darkness. Horror beyond words, beasts uttered human speech; rivers stood still, the earth gaped upon; in the temples ivory images wept for grief, and beads of sweat covered bronze statues. King of waterways, the Po swept forests along in the swirl of his frenzied current, carrying with him over the plain cattle and stalls alike. Nor in that same hour did sinister filaments cease to appear in ominous entrails or blood to flow from wells or our hillside towns to echo all night with the howl of wolves. Never fell more lightning from a cloudless sky; never was comet's alarming glare so often seen.

== Conspiracy ==
=== Notable conspirators ===
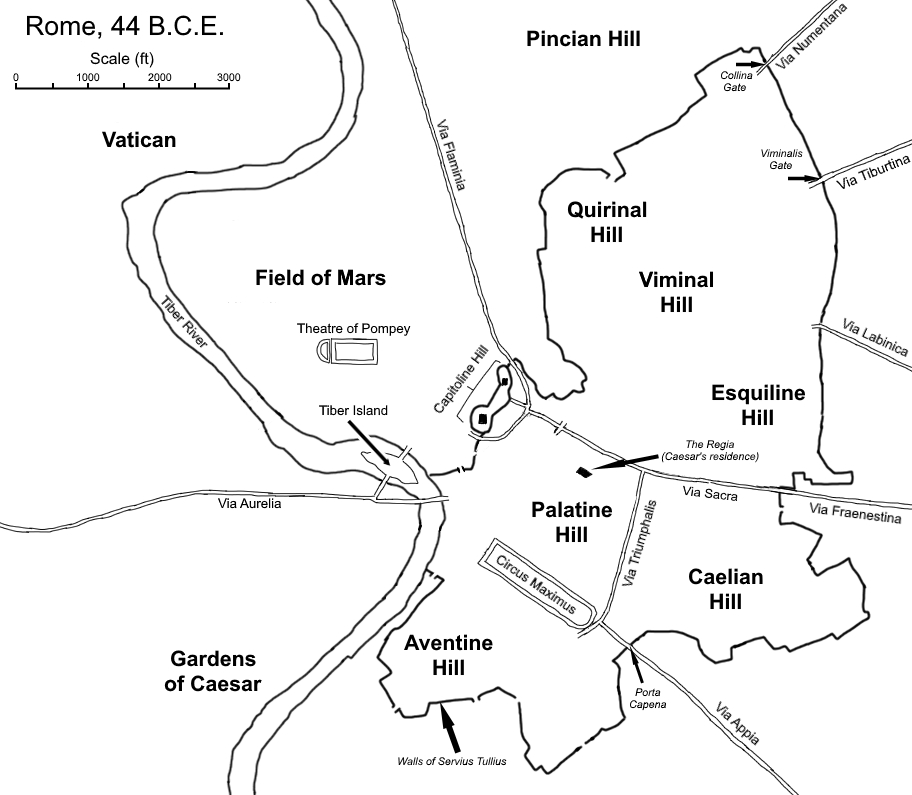
The city of Rome, 44 BC

The conspiracy to assassinate Julius Caesar began with a meeting between Cassius Longinus and his brother-in-law Marcus Brutus in the evening of 22 February 44 BC. After some discussion they agreed that something had to be done to prevent Caesar from becoming king of the Romans.

The two men then began to recruit others. Brutus believed that for the assassination of Caesar to be considered a legitimate removal of a tyrant, done for the sake of their country, it must include a large number of Rome's leading men. They attempted to strike a balance: they aimed to recruit enough men to surround Caesar and fight his supporters, but not so many that they would risk being discovered. They preferred friends to acquaintances and recruited neither reckless youths nor feeble elders. In the end, the conspirators recruited senators near the age of forty, as were they. The men assessed each potential recruit with innocent-sounding questions. The ancient sources report that in the end, around sixty to eighty conspirators joined the plot, although the latter number may be a scribal error.

Notable conspirators included Pacuvius Labeo, who answered affirmatively on 2 March when Brutus asked him whether it was wise for a man to put himself into danger if it meant overcoming evil or foolish men; Decimus Brutus, who joined on 7 March after being approached by Labeo and Cassius; Gaius Trebonius, Tillius Cimber, Minucius Basilus, and the brothers Casca (Publius and another whose name is unknown), all men from Caesar's own ranks; and Pontius Aquila, who had been personally humiliated by Caesar. According to Nicolaus of Damascus, the conspirators included Caesar's soldiers, officers, and civilian associates, and while some joined the conspiracy due to concerns over Caesar's authoritarianism, many had self-interested motives such as jealousy: feeling that Caesar had not rewarded them enough or that he had given too much money towards Pompey's former supporters. The conspirators did not meet openly but instead secretly assembled at each other's homes and in small groups in order to work out a plan.

=== Planning ===
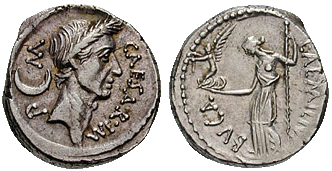
Denarius from 44 BC, showing Julius Caesar on the obverse and the goddess Venus on the reverse of the coin. Caption: CAESAR IMP. M. / L. AEMILIVS BVCA

First, the conspirators discussed the addition of two other men to the conspiracy. Cicero, the famous orator, was trusted by both Cassius and Brutus, and had made it no secret that he considered Caesar's rule oppressive. He also had great popularity among the common people and a large network of friends, which would help attract others to join their cause. However, the conspirators considered Cicero too cautious; at that time, Cicero was over sixty, and the conspirators thought he would be too likely to put safety over speed when planning the assassination. Next, the conspirators considered Mark Antony, aged thirty-nine and one of Caesar's best generals. The conspirators were agreeing to attempt to recruit him until Gaius Trebonius spoke. He revealed that he had personally approached Antony the summer before and asked him to join a different conspiracy to end Caesar's life, and Antony had turned him down. This rejection to the old conspiracy caused the conspirators to decide against recruiting Antony.

Subsequently, a new idea took place. Antony was strong because of his familiarity with the soldiers, and powerful due to his consulship. If Antony was not to join them, then they must assassinate Antony as well, lest he interfere with the conspiracy. Eventually, this idea was expanded upon and split the conspirators into two factions. The optimates, the "Best Men" of Rome, among the conspirators wanted to go back to the way things were before Caesar. This would entail killing both Caesar and all the men around him, including Antony, and reversing Caesar's reforms. The former supporters of Caesar among the conspirators did not agree to this. They liked Caesar's reforms, and did not want a purge of Caesar's supporters; however, even they agreed to kill Antony.

Brutus disagreed with both. He argued that killing Caesar and doing nothing else was the option they should choose. The conspirators claimed to be acting based on the principles of law and justice, he told them, and it would be unjust to kill Antony. While the assassination of Caesar would be viewed as the killing of a tyrant, killing his supporters would be seen only as a politicized purge and the work of Pompey's former supporters. By keeping Caesar's reforms intact, they would both keep the support of the Roman people, who Brutus believed opposed Caesar the king, not Caesar the reformer, and the support of Caesar's soldiers and other supporters. His argument convinced the other conspirators. They began making plans for Caesar's assassination.

The conspirators believed that how and where they assassinated Caesar would make a difference. An ambush in a secluded area would have a different impact on public opinion from an assassination in the heart of Rome. The conspirators came up with multiple ideas for the assassination. They considered an attack on Caesar while he was walking on the Via Sacra, the "Sacred Street". Another idea was to wait to attack him during the elections for new consuls. The conspirators would wait for Caesar to begin crossing the bridge that all voters crossed as part of the election procedures, and then topple him over the rail and into the water. There would be conspirators waiting in the water for Caesar, with daggers drawn. Another plan was to attack at a gladiatorial game, which had the benefit that nobody would be suspicious of armed men.

Finally, somebody brought up the idea to assassinate Caesar at one of the senate meetings. All other plans had one weakness: while Caesar had no official bodyguards, he asked his friends to protect him in public. Most of these friends were imposing and dangerous-looking and the conspirators were afraid that they would interfere with the assassination. Here, this would not be an issue, since only senators were allowed in the Senate House. Some also said that the murder of a tyrant in full view of the Senate would not be seen as a political plot, but as a noble act, done on behalf of their country. The conspirators ultimately settled on this as the chosen plan. Caesar would be leaving the city on 18 March to embark on a military campaign against the Parthians. The last senate meeting before that date was on the 15th, the Ides of March, and so the conspirators chose this as the day of the assassination.

According to the ancient historian Plutarch, a seer had warned Caesar that his life would be in danger no later than the Ides of March. The Roman biographer Suetonius identifies this seer as a haruspex named Spurinna. On 1 March, Caesar watched Cassius speaking with Brutus at the senate house and said to an aide, "What do you think Cassius is up to? I don't like him, he looks pale." Two days before the assassination, Cassius met with the conspirators and told them that, should anyone discover the plan, they were to turn their knives on themselves.

=== Ides of March ===
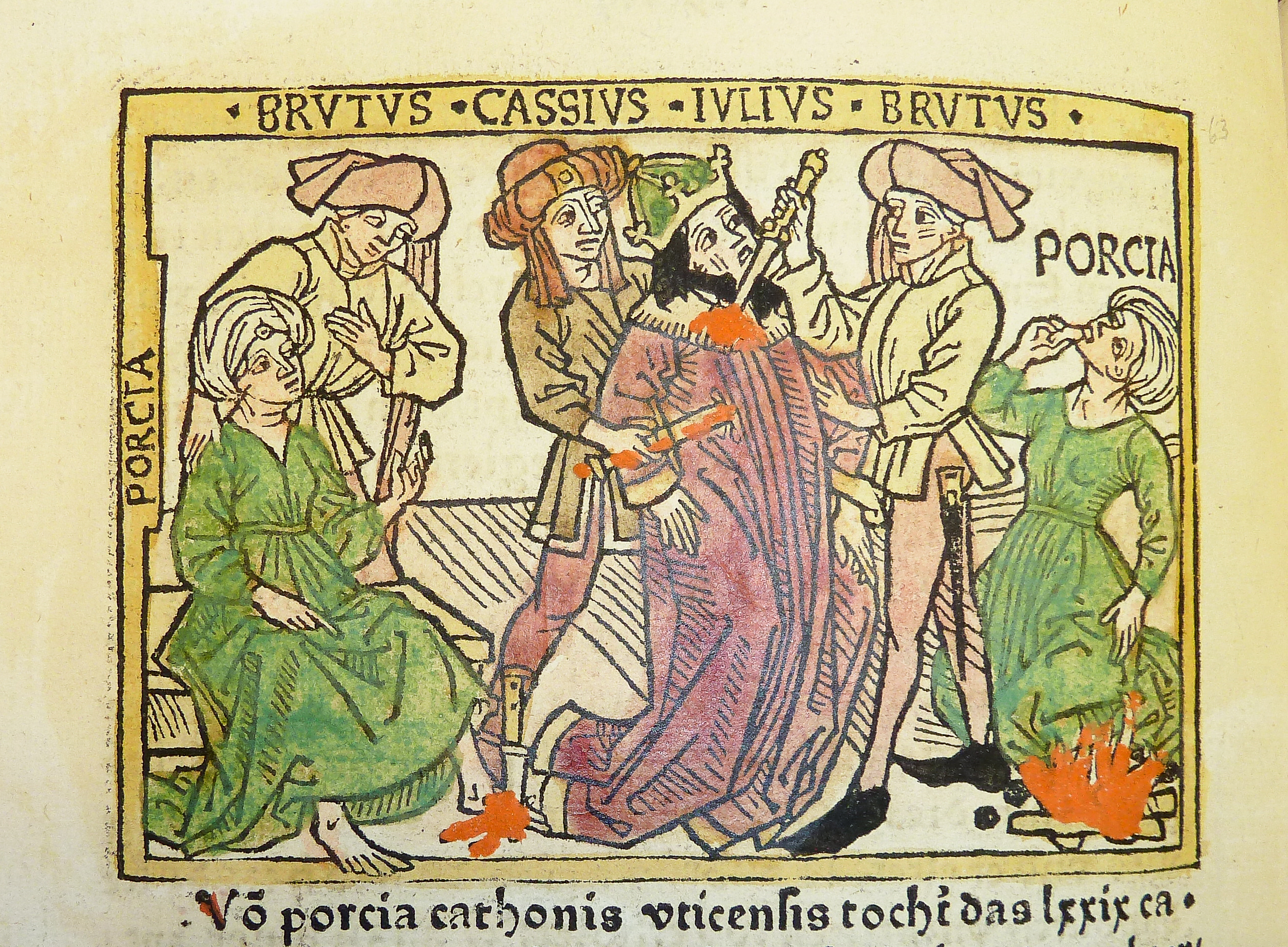
An anachronistic illustration by Johannes Zainer, c. 1474

On the Ides of March of 44 BC, the conspirators—about 60 of whom, according to Roman historian Eutropius, would participate in attacking Caesar—gathered at a scheduled Senate meeting in the Curia of Pompey, atop the steps outside the Theatre of Pompey. Decimus Brutus stationed his gladiators, competing in games taking place at the Theatre, at the adjacent Portico of Pompey so that they could ensure the assassination went through and protect the conspirators if necessary.

Caesar did not show up, having been convinced to stay home by Calpurnia, his wife, after she awoke from a nightmare in which he died. Instead, Mark Antony was sent to dismiss the Senate. He was detained by either Trebonius or Decimus Brutus, and Decimus Brutus visited Caesar to successfully change his mind, asking whether someone of his stature would trust "a woman's dreams and the omens of foolish men".

As Caesar was walking to the meeting, he reportedly saw Spurinna. He playfully informed Spurinna that the Ides had come, and he was alive; Spurinna replied that they had not yet gone. According to Plutarch, as he took his seat, he was presented by conspirator Lucius Tillius Cimber with a petition to recall Cimber's exiled brother. The other conspirators surrounded them, ostensibly to offer support. Both Plutarch and Suetonius say that Caesar waved Cimber away, but Cimber grabbed Caesar's shoulders and pulled down his toga. Caesar reacted by crying, "Why, this is violence!" ("Ista quidem vis est!"). He grabbed the arm of Publius Servilius Casca before he could be stabbed in the neck, asking, "Casca, you villain, what are you doing?" Publius Servilius Casca called for his brother, Gaius Servilius Casca, who stabbed Caesar in the side as Publius Servilius Casca was thrown off. Within moments, he was being attacked with daggers from all directions; in his face, by Cassius; in his back, or the back of his head, by Bucilianus; and in his thigh, by Decimus Brutus. He fled down the steps, but blinded by blood, he fell near a statue of Pompey the Great. He was once again swarmed, eventually dying.

Although Caesar was stabbed 23 times, according to an autopsy—the first in recorded history—only one wound, the second near his ribs, was fatal. His death was mostly attributable to blood loss. His corpse was untouched for some time afterwards, being taken home by slaves on a litter, with one arm hanging down.

Caesar's last words are a contested subject among scholars and historians. Cassius Dio and Suetonius state that he said nothing, but also note that others have said they were "καὶ σύ, τέκνον", (Kai su, teknon? in Greek, or "You, too, child?" in English). Plutarch reports that Caesar said nothing, pulling his toga over his head when he saw Brutus among the conspirators. (Note: The version best known in the English-speaking world is the Latin phrase "Et tu, Brute?" ("You too, Brutus?"); this derives from William Shakespeare's Julius Caesar (1599), where it actually forms the first half of a macaronic line: "Et tu, Brute? Then fall, Caesar.")

According to Plutarch, after the assassination, Brutus moved towards the senators not involved in the plot, as if to address them; however, the senators ran away. The conspirators then left themselves, according to Suetonius, and marched through the city, proclaiming that Rome was once again free. With citizens hiding inside their homes as soon as rumours of the assassination began to spread, the news was met with silence.

== Aftermath ==
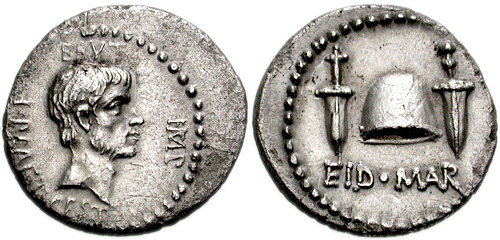
The Ides of March coin, a Denarius portraying Brutus (obverse), minted in 43–42 BC. The reverse shows a pileus between two daggers, with the legend EID MAR (Eidibus Martiis – on the Ides of March), commemorating the assassination.

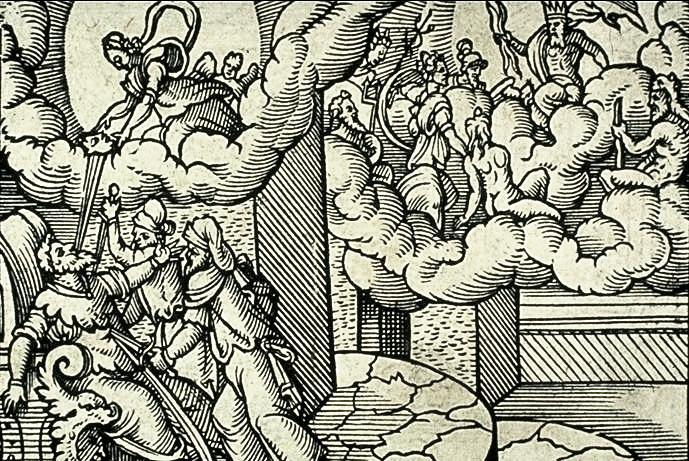
Deification of Julius Caesar, a 16th-century engraving by Virgil Solis illustrating Ovid's passage on the apotheosis of Caesar (Metamorphoses 15.745–850)

A wax statue of Caesar was erected at the Forum displaying the 23 stab wounds. A crowd who had amassed there expressed their anger at the assassins by burning the Curia of Pompey (the Senate House). Two days after the assassination, Mark Antony summoned the senate and worked out a compromise in which the assassins would not be punished, but all of Caesar's appointments would remain valid. By doing this, Antony most likely hoped to avoid large cracks in government forming as a result of Caesar's death. Simultaneously, Antony diminished the goals of the conspirators.

The result unforeseen by the assassins was that Caesar's death precipitated the end of the Roman Republic. The Roman lower classes, with whom Caesar was popular, became enraged that a small group of aristocrats had sacrificed him. Antony capitalized on the grief of the Roman mob and threatened to unleash them on the optimates, perhaps with the intent of taking control of Rome himself. But, to his surprise and chagrin, Caesar had named his grandnephew Gaius Octavius his sole heir, bequeathing him the immensely potent Caesar name as well as making him one of the wealthiest citizens in the Republic. Upon hearing of his adoptive father's death, Octavius abandoned his studies in Apollonia and sailed across the Adriatic Sea to Brundisium. Octavius became Gaius Julius Caesar Octavianus or Octavian, the son of the great Caesar, and consequently also inherited the loyalty of much of the Roman populace. Octavian, aged only 18 at the time of Caesar's death, proved to have considerable political skills, and while Antony dealt with Decimus Brutus in the first round of the new civil wars, Octavian consolidated his tenuous position. Antony did not initially consider Octavian a true political threat due to his young age and inexperience, but Octavian quickly gained the support and admiration of Caesar's friends and supporters.

To combat Brutus and Cassius, who were massing an enormous army in Greece, Antony needed soldiers, the money from Caesar's war chests, and the legitimacy that Caesar's name would provide for any action he took against them. With passage of the Lex Titia on 27 November 43 BC, the Second Triumvirate was officially formed, composed of Antony, Octavian, and Caesar's Master of the Horse Lepidus. It formally deified Caesar as Divus Iulius in 42 BC, and Caesar Octavian henceforth became Divi filius ("Son of the Divine"). Seeing that Caesar's clemency had resulted in his murder, the Second Triumvirate brought back proscription, abandoned since Sulla. It engaged in the legally sanctioned murder of a large number of its opponents in order to fund its forty-five legions in the second civil war against Brutus and Cassius. Antony and Octavian defeated them at Philippi.

The Second Triumvirate was ultimately unstable and could not withstand internal jealousies and ambitions. Antony detested Octavian and spent most of his time in the East, while Lepidus favoured Antony but felt himself obscured by both his colleagues. Following the Sicilian revolt, led by Sextus Pompey, a dispute between Lepidus and Octavian regarding the allocation of lands broke out. Octavian accused Lepidus of usurping power in Sicily and of attempted rebellion and, in 36 BC, Lepidus was forced into exile in Circeii and stripped of all his offices except that of Pontifex Maximus. His former provinces were awarded to Octavian. Meanwhile, Antony married Caesar's lover, Cleopatra, intending to use the fabulously wealthy Egypt as a base to dominate Rome. A third and last civil war (the War of Actium) subsequently broke out between Octavian on one hand and Antony and Cleopatra on the other. This final civil war culminated in the latter's defeat at Actium in 31 BC; Octavian's forces would then chase Antony and Cleopatra to Alexandria, where they would both commit suicide in 30 BC. With the complete defeat of Antony and the marginalisation of Lepidus, Octavian, having been restyled "Augustus", a name that raised him to the status of a deity, in 27 BC, remained as the sole master of the Roman world and proceeded to establish the Principate as the first Roman emperor.

== List of conspirators ==
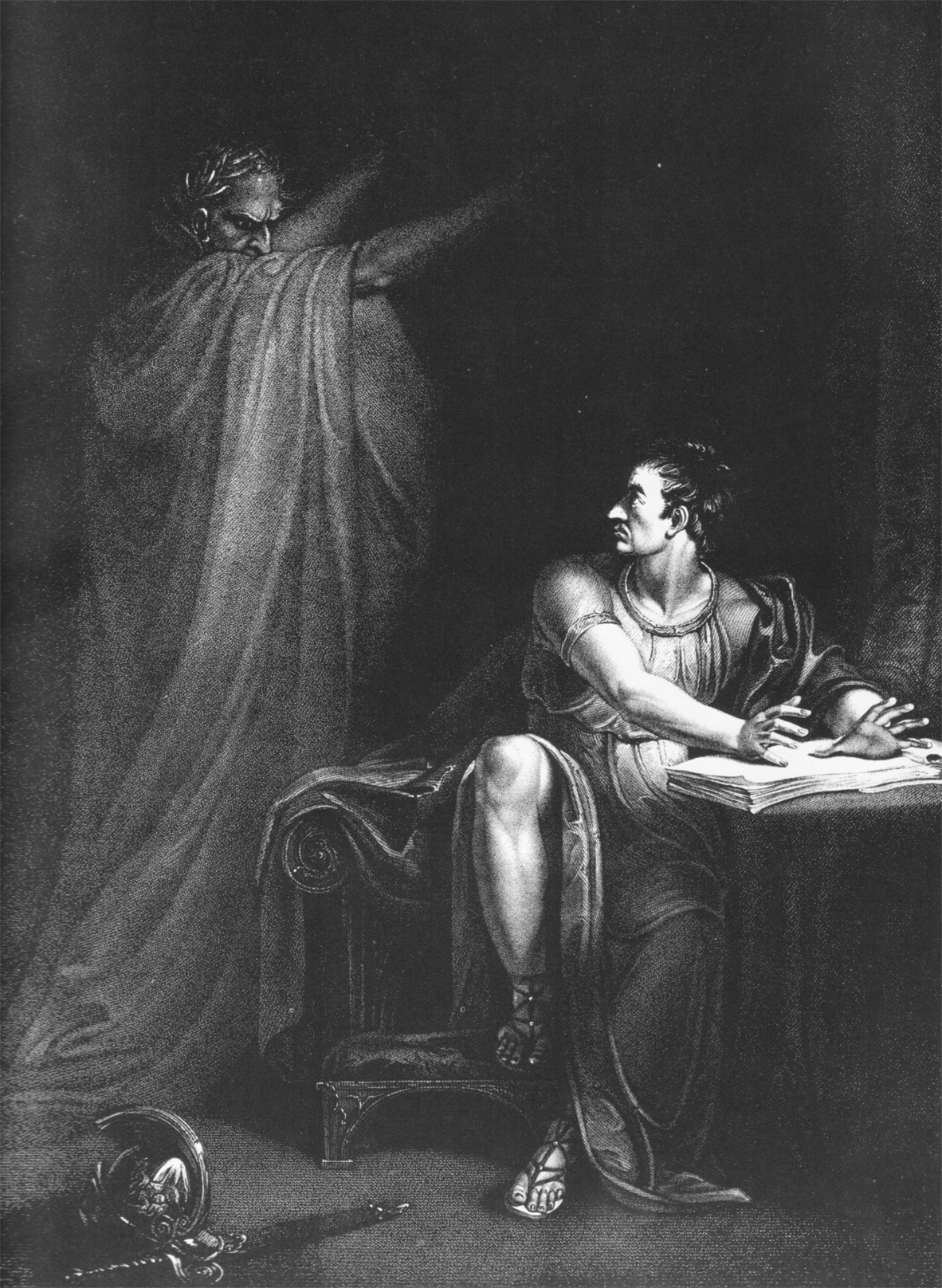
Brutus and the Ghost of Caesar (1802), copperplate engraving by Edward Scriven from a painting by Richard Westall, illustrating Act IV, Scene III, from Shakespeare's Julius Caesar

Of all the conspirators, only about twenty names are known. Nothing is known about some of those whose names have survived. The known members are (leaders are highlighted in bold):

- **Marcus Junius Brutus**, former Pompeian, the fifth and last of the assassins to wound Caesar, in the groin
- **Gaius Cassius Longinus**, former Pompeian, the second assassin to strike Caesar, in the face
- **Decimus Junius Brutus Albinus**, former Caesarian, the fourth assassin to land a wound on Caesar (a stab to the thigh)
- **Gaius Trebonius**, former Caesarian, did not participate in the attack; kept Mark Antony outside the Theatre of Pompey while Caesar was being stabbed instead.
- Lucius Tillius Cimber, former Caesarian, the one responsible for setting the stage for the attack
- Publius Servilius Casca Longus, former Caesarian, the one responsible for the first stab, to Caesar's shoulder
- Servius Sulpicius Galba, former Caesarian
- Servilius Casca, former Caesarian, brother of Publius Casca, the third assassin to strike Caesar, and the only one of the assassins to inflict a fatal wound on Caesar (a stab between the ribs)
- Pontius Aquila, former Pompeian
- Quintus Ligarius, former Pompeian
- Lucius Minucius Basilus, former Caesarian
- Gaius Cassius Parmensis
- Caecilius, former Pompeian
- Bucilianus, former Pompeian, brother of Caecilius
- Rubrius Ruga, former Pompeian
- Marcus Spurius, former Pompeian
- Publius Sextius Naso, former Pompeian
- Petronius
- Publius Turullius
- Pacuvius Labeo

Although Brutus invoked his name after the assassination, Cicero was not a member of the conspiracy. Cicero was instead surprised by it, so much that he later wrote to the conspirator Trebonius how he wished he had been "invited to that superb banquet" and believed that the conspirators should also have killed Mark Antony.

== Gallery ==
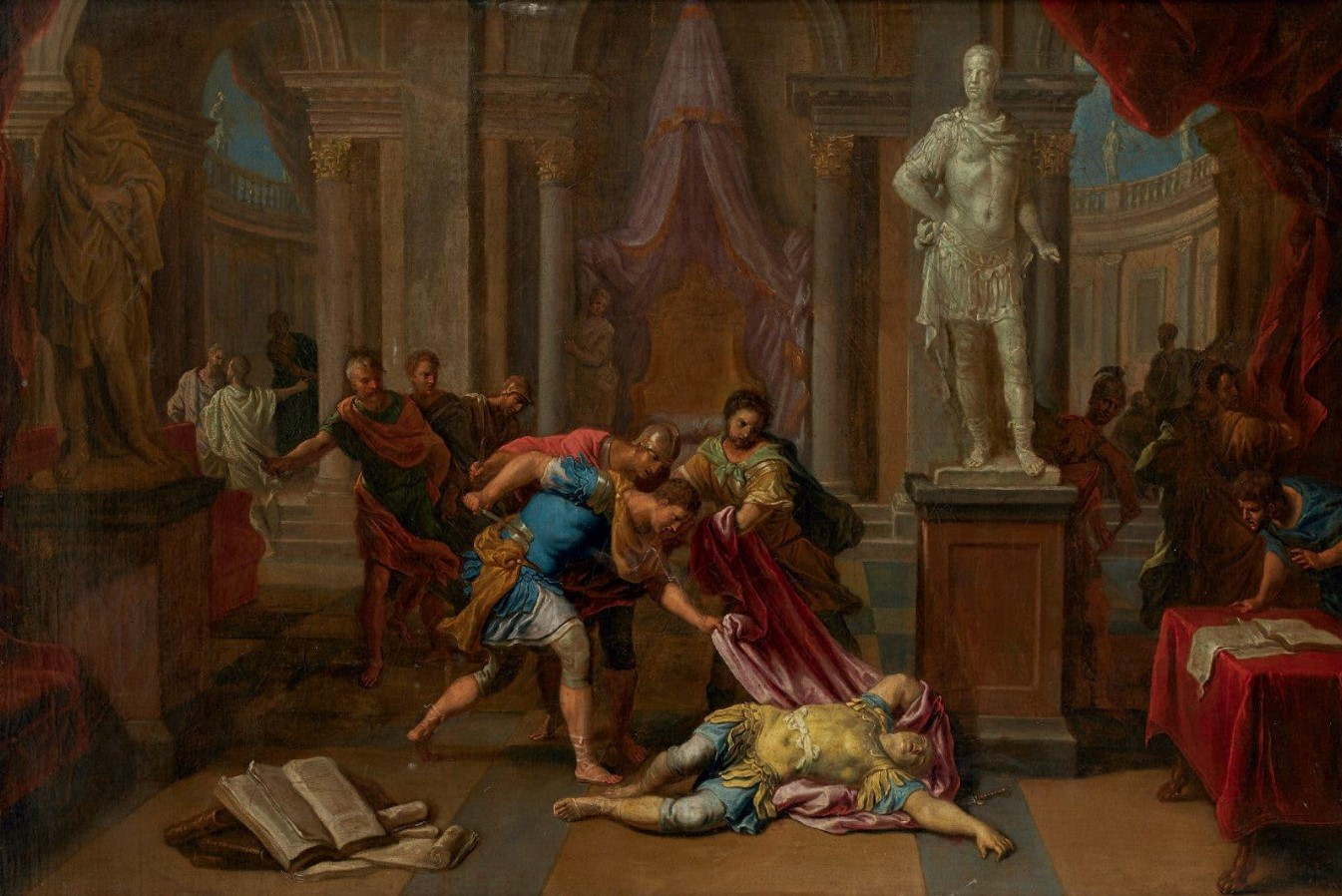
The death of Caesar by Victor Honoré Janssens, c. 1690s

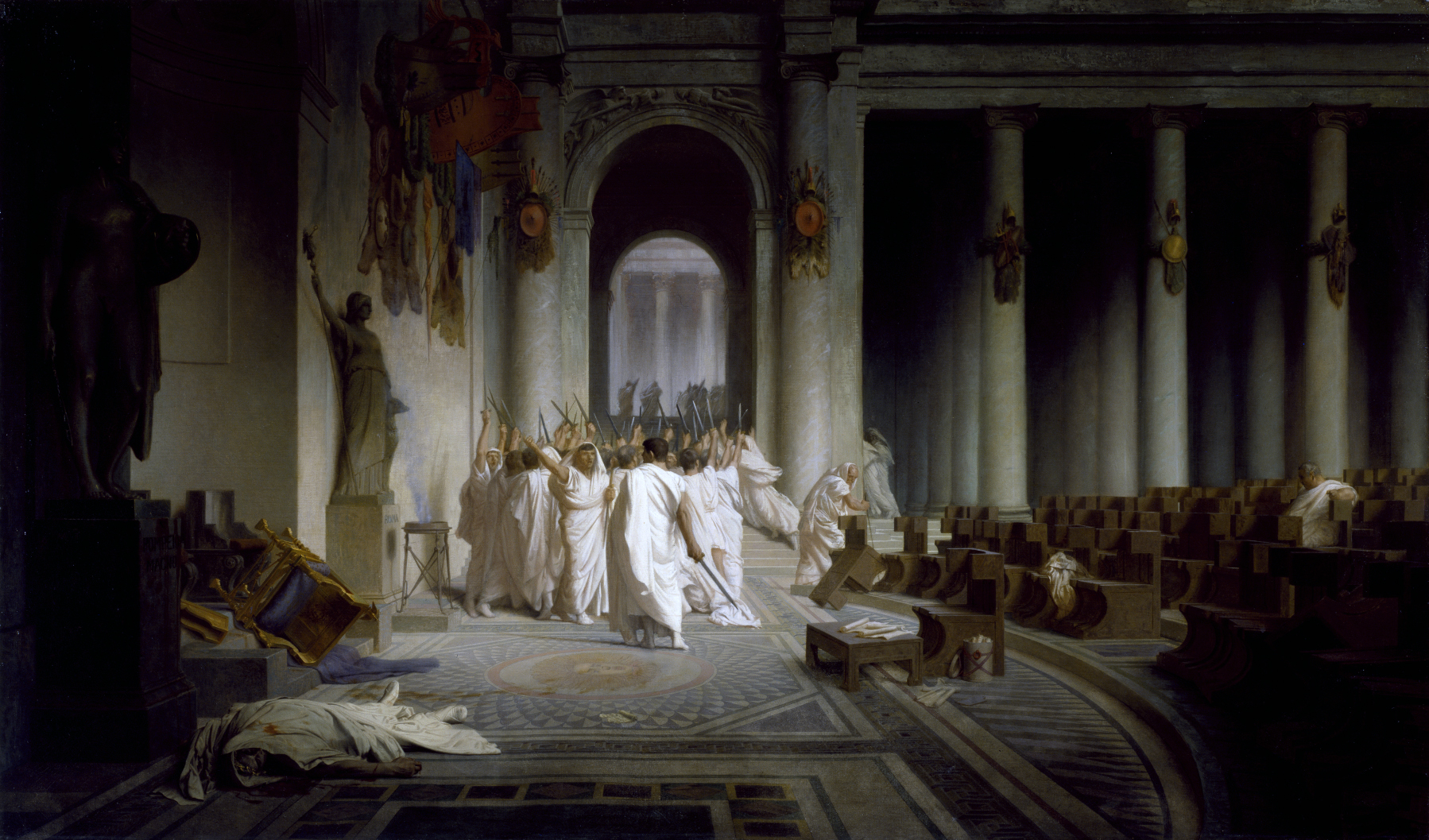
Aftermath of the attack with Caesar's body abandoned in the foreground, La Mort de César by Jean-Léon Gérôme, c. 1859–1867

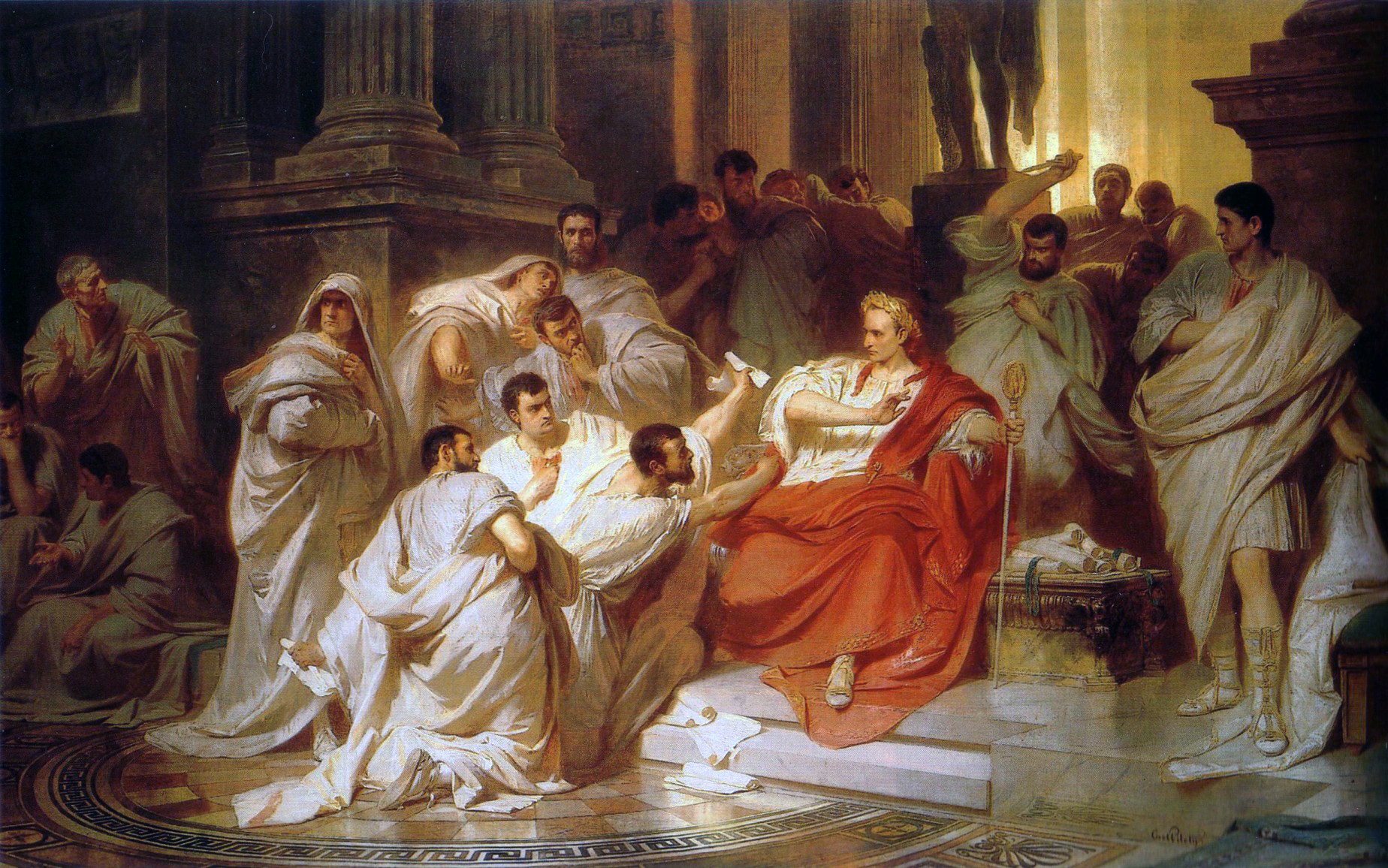
The Murder of Caesar by Karl von Piloty, 1865, Lower Saxony State Museum

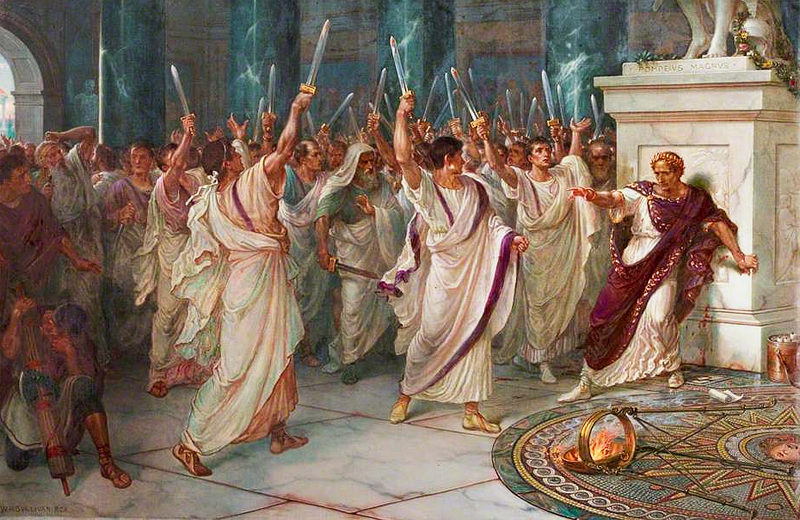
The Assassination of Julius Caesar by William Holmes Sullivan, c. 1888, Royal Shakespeare Theatre

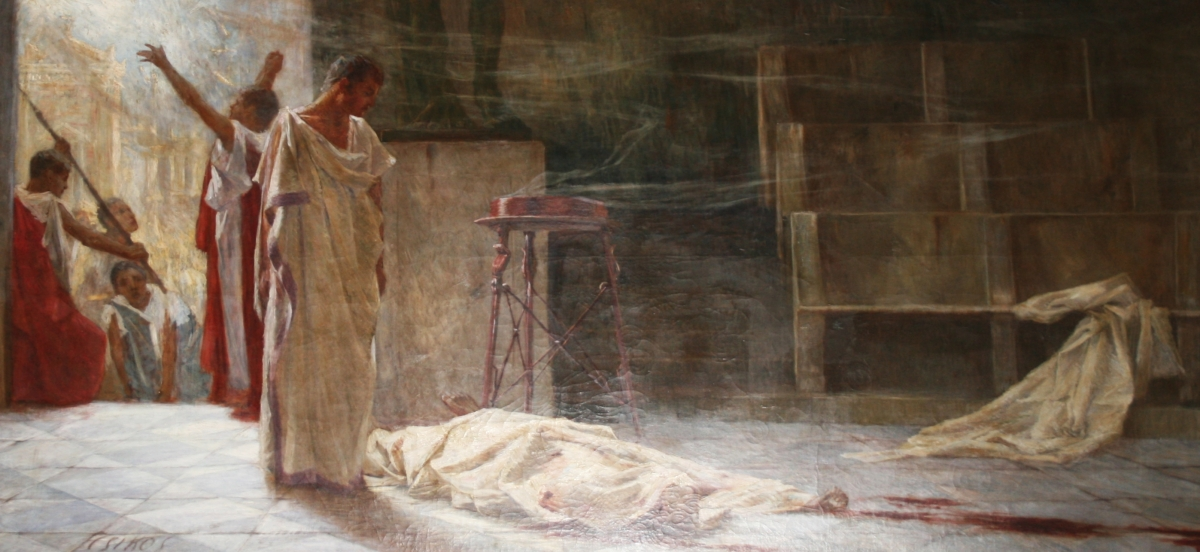
Mark Antony with the dead body of Caesar, painted by Bela Čikoš Sesija, before 1920

== Legacy and media ==
Following the assassination of Caesar and the ensuing civil war afterward, multiple novels, plays, and films were created surrounding the plot, the most famous of which was the 1599 play Julius Caesar by William Shakespeare.

- 1914: Julius Caesar, an Italian film focusing on Caesar's return to Rome, the Ides of March, and the civil war.
- 1950: Julius Caesar, starring Charlton Heston
- 1953: Julius Caesar, a film adaptation of Shakespeare's play.
- 1954: "Rinse the Blood Off My Toga", a comedy sketch by Wayne and Shuster reimagining both the play and the event as a detective noir story. First performed on radio and later reprised many times on television.
- 1970: Julius Caesar, another film adaptation of Shakespeare's play.
- 2002: Julius Caesar, a miniseries surrounding Caesar's life and assassination.
- 2005: Rome, an HBO TV-series focusing on events from the end of the Gallic wars through the rise of Octavian (52BCE-31BCE).

== See also ==
- Acta Caesaris
- Death of Alexander the Great
- Death of Cleopatra
- Julius Caesar, a play by William Shakespeare
- List of assassinated and executed heads of state and government
- The Ides of March, a novel by Thornton Wilder
- The Throne of Caesar, a novel by Steven Saylor
- Theme of the Traitor and the Hero, a short story by Jorge Luis Borges

== Bibliography ==
- Crook, J. A.; Lintott, Andrew; Rawson, Elizabeth, eds. (1992). The Cambridge Ancient History. Vol. IX, The Last Age of the Roman Republic. Cambridge University Press.
- Balsdon, J.P.V.D. (1958). "The Ides of March". Historia: Zeitschrift für Alte Geschichte. 7 (1): 80–94. JSTOR 4434559.
- Drumann, W. (1906). P. Groebe (ed.). Geschichte Roms in seinem Uebergange von der republikanischen zur monarchischen Verfassung, oder: Pompeius, Caesar, Cicero und ihre Zeitgenossen (in German). Vol. 3 (2nd ed.). Leipzig: Berlin, Gebr£uder Borntraeger.
- Epstein, David F. (1987). "Caesar's Personal Enemies on the Ides of March". Latomus. 46 (3): 566–570. ISSN 0023-8856. JSTOR 41540686.
- Horsfall, Nicholas (1974). "The Ides of March: Some New Problems". Greece & Rome. 21 (2): 191–199. doi:10.1017/S0017383500022397. ISSN 0017-3835. S2CID 161450088.
- Parenti, Michael (2004). The assassination of Julius Caesar : a people's history of Ancient Rome. New Press. ISBN 1-56584-942-6. OCLC 56643456.
- Smith, R.E. (1957). "The Conspiracy and the Conspirators". Greece & Rome. 4 (1): 58–70. doi:10.1017/S0017383500015734. ISSN 0017-3835. S2CID 159706303.
- Strauss, Barry S. (2015). The death of Caesar : the story of history's most famous assassination. Simon & Schuster. ISBN 978-1-4516-6881-0. OCLC 913303337.
- Yavetz, Zvi (1974). "Existimatio, Fama, and the Ides of March". Harvard Studies in Classical Philology. 78: 35–65. doi:10.2307/311200. JSTOR 311200.
- Dando-Collins, Stephen (2010). The Ides: Caesar's Murder and the War for Rome. Wiley. ISBN 978-0470425237.

== Relevant literature ==
- Sheldon, Rose Mary (2018). Kill Caesar!: Assassination in the Early Roman Empire. Rowman & Littlefield. ISBN 978-1-538-11488-9.
