= Gilt Bronzes from Cartoceto di Pergola =

Sculpture

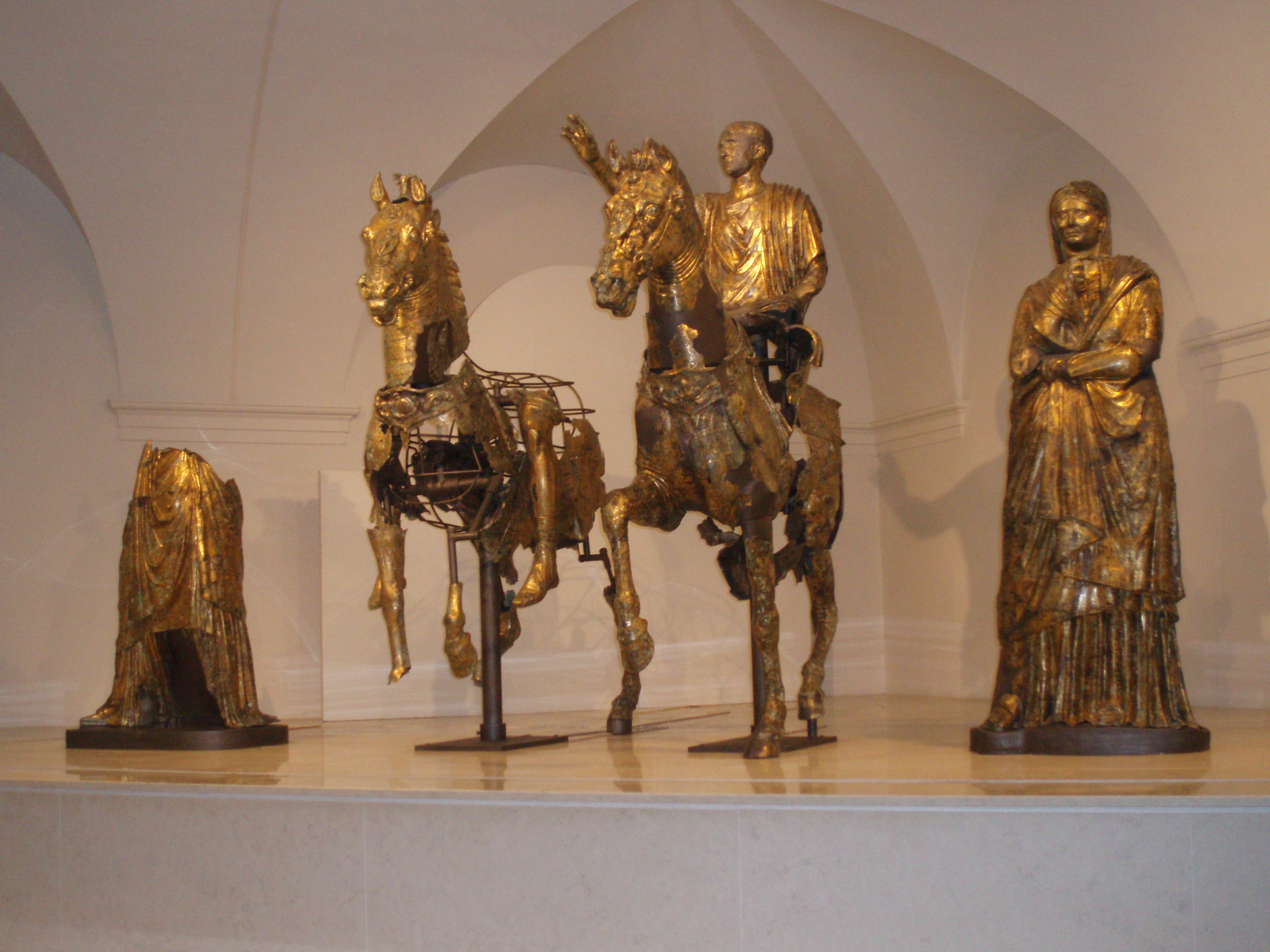
The Gilt Bronzes from Cartoceto di Pergola.

The Gilt Bronzes from Cartoceto di Pergola are the only surviving Roman gilt bronze equestrian group. The monumental ensemble was composed of at least two people on horseback, of which only one remains, and two standing women.

The statues were found in 1946 in many pieces, not far from the intersection of the Via Flaminia and the Via Salaria Gallica in the parish of Cartoceto, near Pergola, Marche, in central Italy. This was an isolated location, far from urban centres, and it is thought they were not originally sited there, but moved for some reason.

The statues may represent the family of Germanicus and date to the early 1st century AD, but more likely date from 50–30 BC and depict Gnaeus Domitius Ahenobarbus and his father Lucius (both consuls), although other figures of local importance have also been suggested.

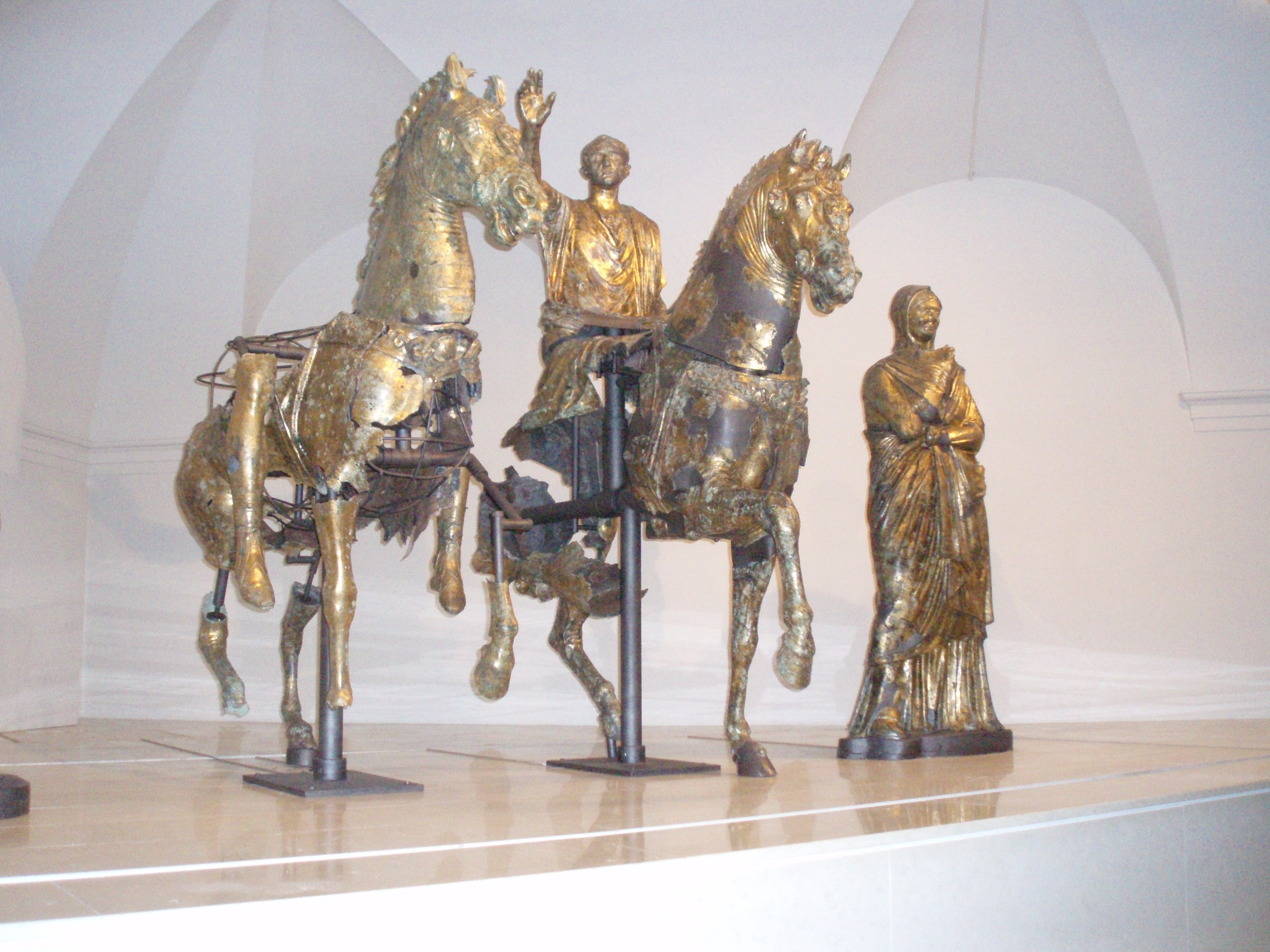
From a different angle

Because of its extraordinary archaeological importance, the group has been at the centre of a long controversy between the Soprintendenza per i Beni Archeologici delle Marche and the municipality of Pergola over the location where the bronzes would be preserved. The group was on display at the National Archeological Museum of the Marche, in Ancona, until 1972, when it was moved to the Museo dei Bronzi dorati della città di Pergola, built specifically for this purpose. A compromise solution now moves the original bronzes and replicas between the two sites.

== Description ==
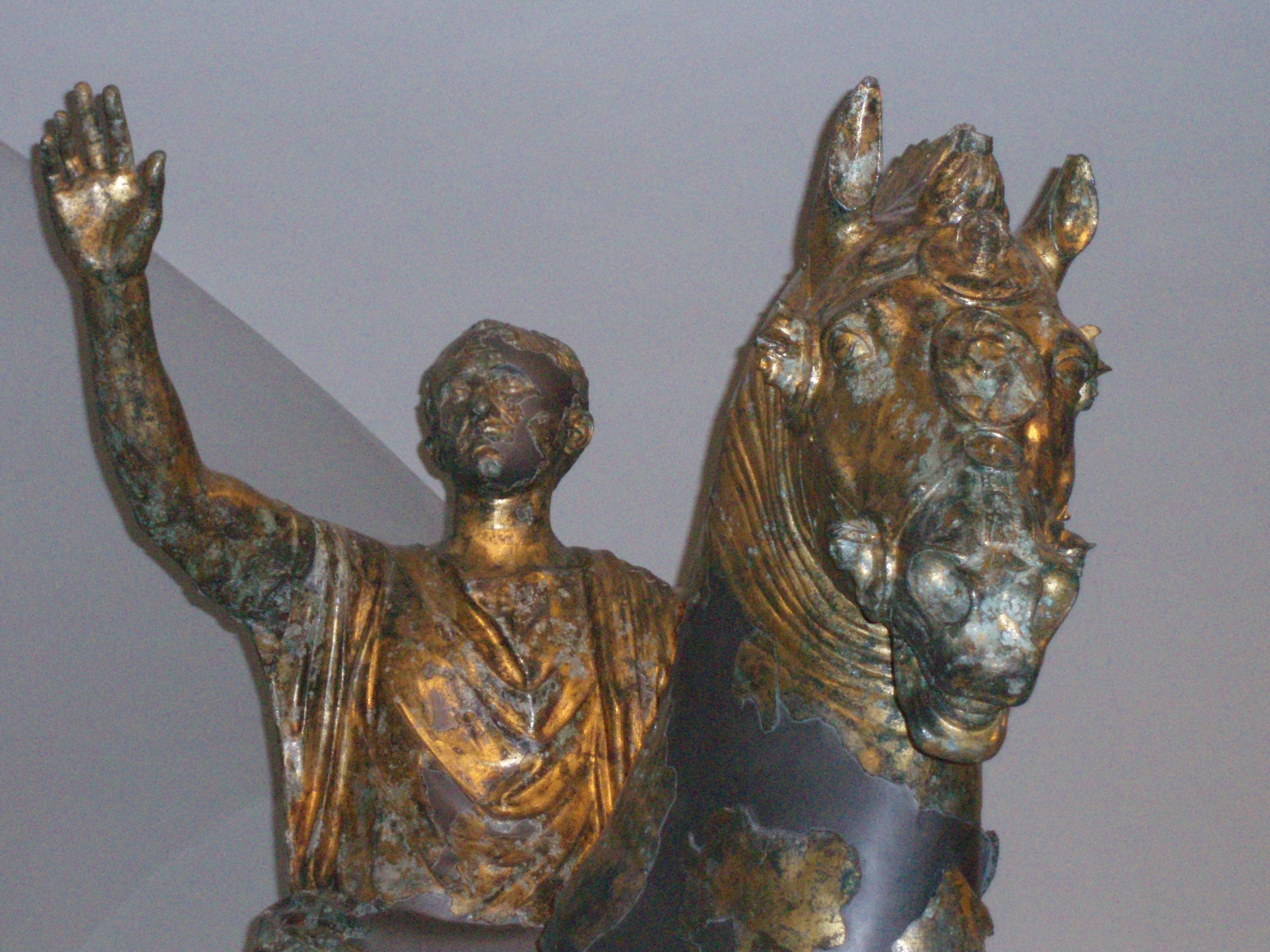
The mounted male

=== Horsemen ===
The best-preserved horseman is a mature man (about 40 years of age), whose clothes (the paludamentum, tunic, and calceus) identify him as a high-ranking military officer in time of peace, consistent with the position of the right arm, raised in the symbol of peace. Only fragments remain of the other horseman.

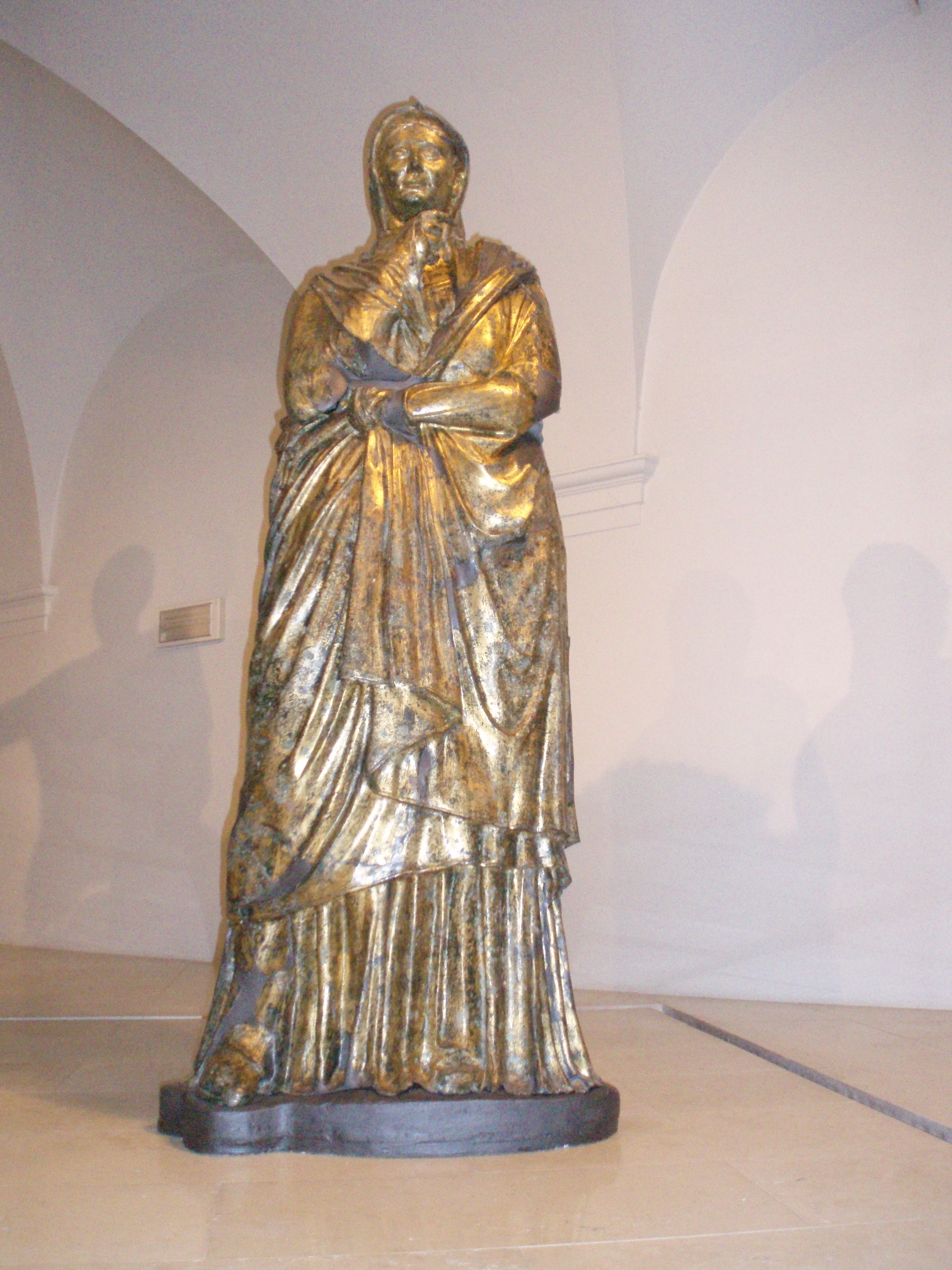
The complete female

=== Women ===
The surviving standing figure depicts an elderly woman, whose hellenistic hairstyle, typical of the second half of the first century, suggests dating the group accordingly. The woman wears a stole and palla (garment). The other female figure is substantially less preserved, as only the lower portions of her body have survived.

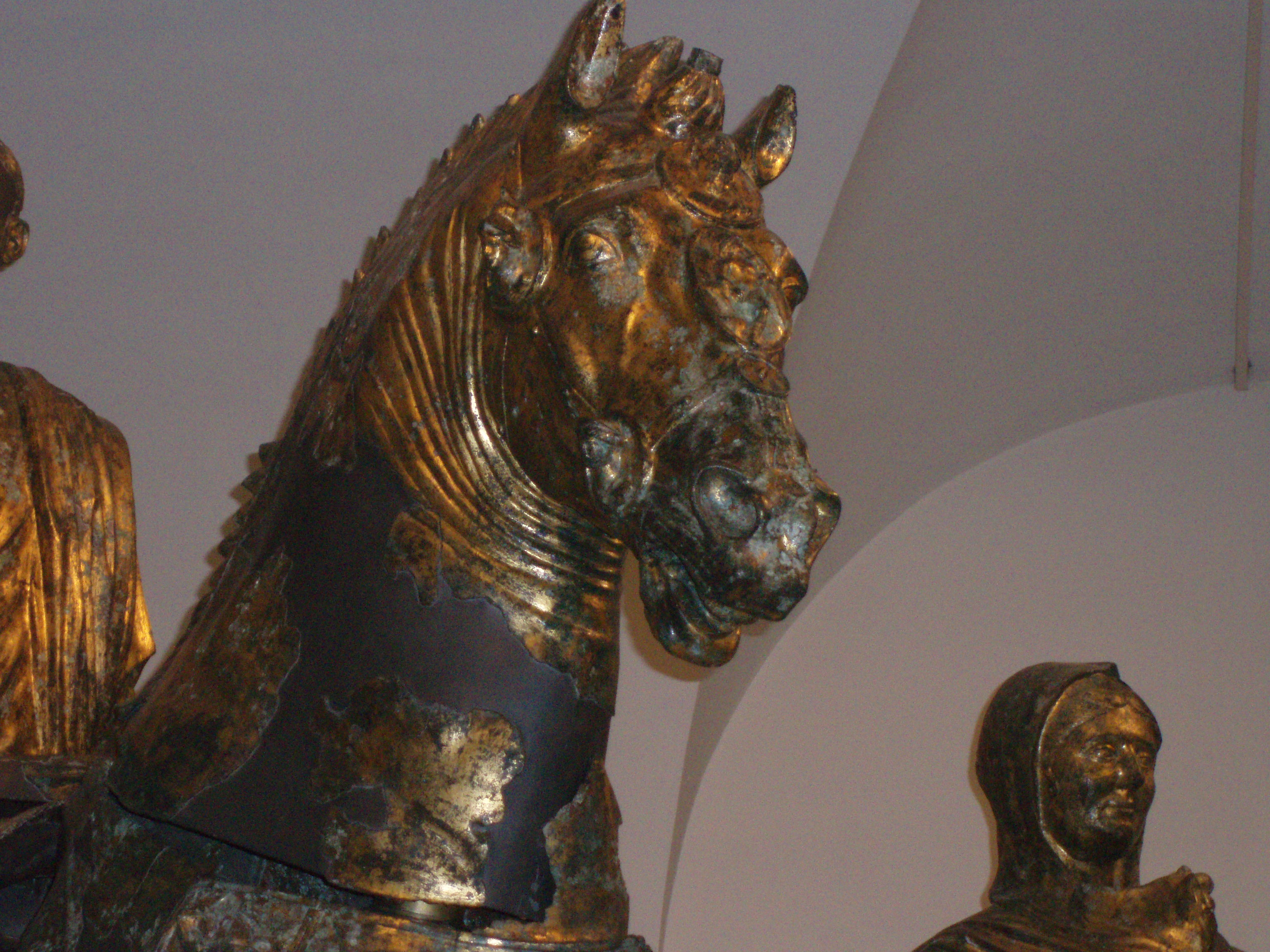
Detail

=== Horses ===
The horses are presented with a raised front leg, which suggests a walking motion. The figures of a triton and a nereid, alongside seahorses and dolphins, adorn each pectoral plate. The harnesses are enriched by metal phaleras on which images of various gods are placed to protect the steed and its owner, including Jupiter, Venus, Mars, Juno, Minerva, and Mercury.

== Techniques and materials ==
The statues, which are largely hollow, were made by using the lost-wax casting method and are composed primarily of a copper alloy (bronze) skin with traces of lead. After assembly, the statues were gilded with gold leaf.

A replica intended to reproduce the bronzes' original state is displayed on the roof of the Palazzo Ferretti (site of the National Archaeological Museum of the Marche) in celebration of local archaeology.

== Discovery and restoration ==
In June and July 1946, hundreds of gilt bronze fragments, weighing hundreds of kilograms, were accidentally discovered in Santa Lucia di Calamello, in Cartoceto di Pergola (Province of Pesaro and Urbino), central Italy. Canon Giovanni Vernarecci, who was at the time the archaeological inspector for the district of Fossombrone, detailed the circumstances of his fortuitous discovery in a typewritten account.

The bronzes were recovered by Vernarecci and Nereo Alfieri, who was the Marche regional inspector of the governmental antiquity department (Soprintendenza alle Antichità delle Marche). 318 fragments were placed together in an attempt to recreate the original statues, and the group was restored in several spurts between 1949 and 1988.

== Original placement of the group ==
The fragments were uncovered not far from the intersection of the Via Flaminia and the Via Salaria Gallica, which is an isolated location, far from urban centres. This unusual collocation has led archaeologists to conjecture that the group was likely removed from its original position and set aside sometime in late antiquity or in Byzantine times — some suggesting that this may have been the result of a damnatio memoriae.

The bronzes' original placement in an urban context is still uncertain. The most accepted hypothesis suggests that the group may have originally rested on a base in some public area (probably the forum of a Roman city near the discovery site). Notable candidates are the Forum Sempronii (Fossombrone), which was closest, Sentinum (Sassoferrato), where the existence a foundry for large statues has been attested, or Suasa, because other large fragments of a similar gilt bronze horse were found there (on display at the Walters Art Museum in Baltimore, see photos and ).

Riminese historian Danilo Re has suggested that the bronzes may have topped Rimini's Arch of Augustus, if the bronzes are determined to represent Julius Caesar, Augustus, Augustus' mother, and Augustus' grandmother.

== Identification ==
The group is composed of two horsemen, two women, and two horses. The characters represented likely belonged to a single family of senatorial rank, but certain identification of the subjects has eluded archaeologists. Some have proposed that the group may depict the imperial family of the Julio-Claudian dynasty, which would date the statues to 20–30 AD. In this case, the horsemen would likely be Nero and Drusus Caesar, sons of Germanicus, while the women would be Livia (Germanicus' grandmother) and Agrippina (Germanicus' wife).

More likely, however, the statues date between 50 and 30 BC and depict members of a prestigious legate's family from the territory in which they were discovered, the Ager Gallicus. Pollini has argued convincingly for an identification with Gnaeus Domitius Ahenobarbus, an important Roman admiral during the Roman Civil Wars who defected to Octavian from Antony just before the Battle of Actium, along with his father Lucius and their wives Aemilia Lepida and Porcia, daughter of Cato. Other less likely candidates include Gnaeus's son Lucius, the Sentinum senator Marcus Satrius, and the assassin Lucius Minucius Basilus who was born in nearby Cupra Maritima (now Cupra Marittima).

A further hypothesis proposes that the group may have originally been placed in the Heraion of Samos Island, and that the subjects are the family of Marcus Tullius Cicero, who would be one of the horsemen.
