= Bucilianus =

Roman senator and assassin of Julius Caesar

Caecilius Bucilianus, also spelled Bucolianus, was a Roman senator who was one of the assassins of Julius Caesar, the dictator of the Roman Republic, on March 15, 44 BCE. Along with Marcus Junius Brutus, Publius Servilius Casca, and others, Bucilianus attacked Caesar during a meeting of the Senate in Rome. Sources differ on whether he struck Caesar in the back, or the back of the head.

== Details ==
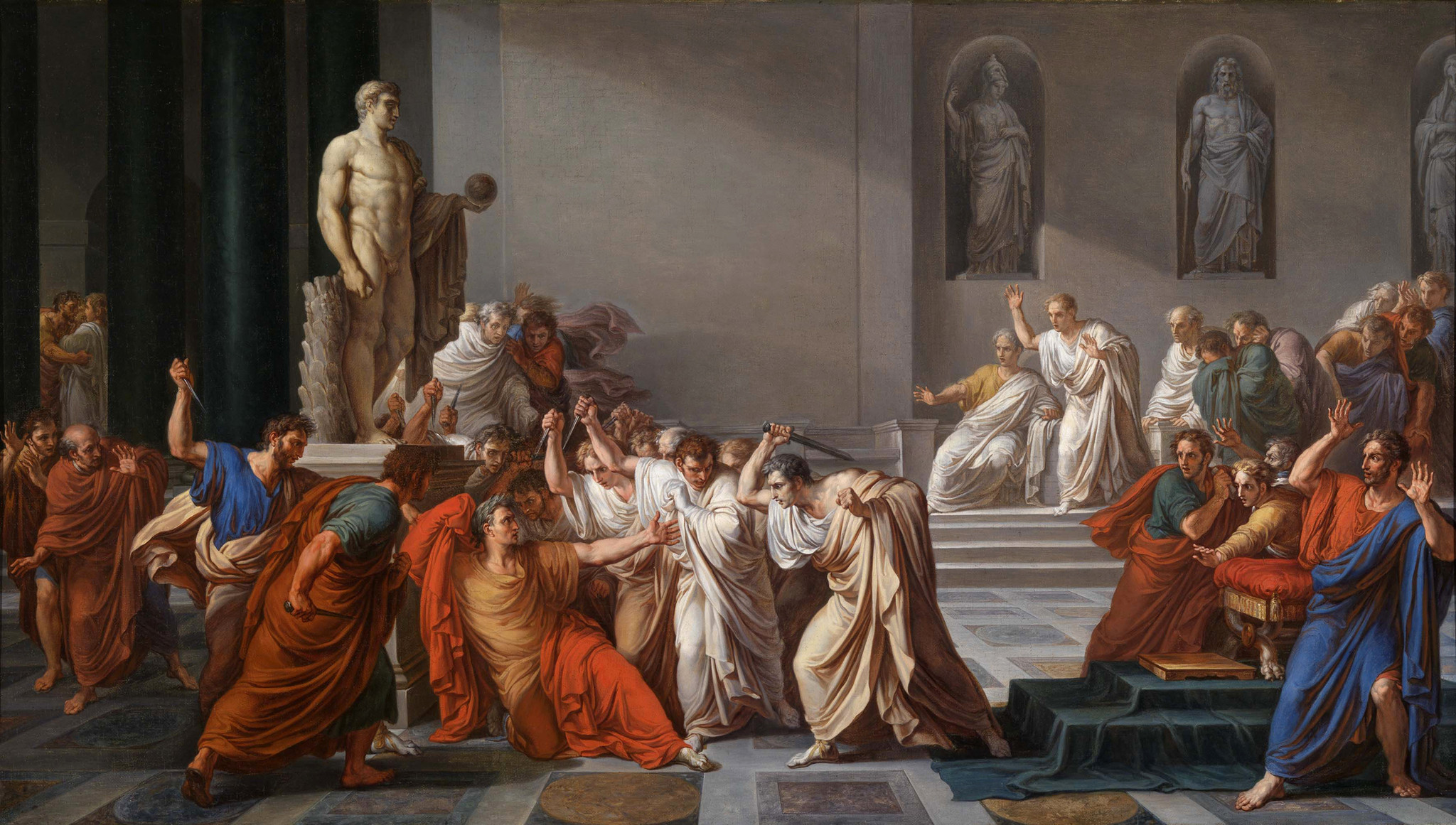
The Death of Julius Caesar by Vincenzo Camuccini, 1806

The conspirators of the assassination were made up of both Caesar's opposition (Pompeians; on the side of Pompey) and former supporters (Caesarians); one source says Bucilianus was likely a Pompeian, while another refers to him as Caesar's former friend.

Most sources say Bucilianus' brother was a fellow senator and conspirator in the assassination, while another does not include him in the list of conspirators. Most say his brother's name was also Caecilius, while one source says his brother's name is unknown.
