= Santa Maria delle Tinte, Pergola =

'Santa Maria delle Tinte is a small Baroque-style, Roman Catholic church, originally a chapel, located on Via XX Settembre just across the river Cesano from the town of Pergola, province of Pesaro and Urbino, region of Marche, Italy.

== Description ==
The church acquired its name from being located outside of town, near the river, in the quarter of the wool-workers and fabric-dyers (tintori), hence the dedication to Holy Mary of the Dye.

Elaborated during the 18th century, the façade remained unfinished in plain brick, but is surmounted by an octagonal drum and cupola. The portal has the date of 1787. The centralized church has an elaborate stucco decoration around the altar. The chapel has a 17th-century copy of the Annunciation by Federico Barocci, a Crucifixion by Giovanni Francesco Ferri, and a Virgin and Saints attributed to Giovanni Anastasi (1653-1704) .
