= The death of Caesar (Janssens) =

Painting by Victor Honoré Janssens

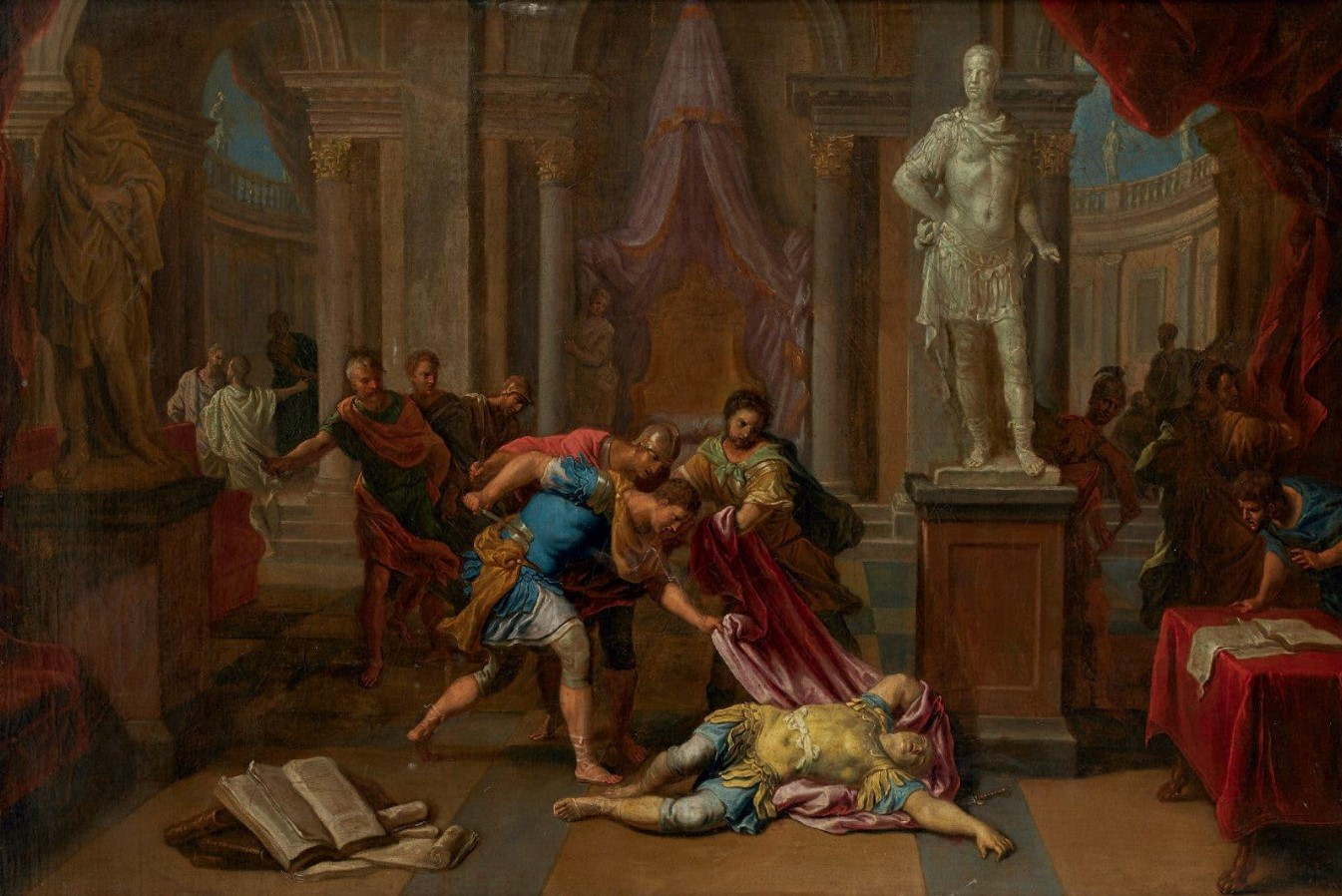
- La mort de César
- Artist: Victor Honoré Janssens
- Medium: Oil on canvas
- Movement: Flemish classist
- Subject: Assassination of Julius Caesar
- Dimensions: 60.5 cm × 90.3 cm (23.8 in × 35.6 in)

The death of Caesar (La mort de César) is a painting by Flemish artist Victor Honoré Janssens between 1658 and 1736 which depicts the assassination of Julius Caesar.

== Description ==
The historical painting was realized between the end of the 17th and the beginning of the 18th century and is a Flemish classic painting, made from oil on canvas. The few years Janssens spent in Rome allowed him to assimilate the classicism of Roman painting, which permeated his works. It is signed in the lower right corner on the base of the sculpture "V. Janssens." The work which is based on Parallel Lives by Plutarch shows the typical classical artistic strokes of the time.

== See also ==
- Cultural depictions of Julius Caesar
