= Chiesa dei Re Magi, Pergola =

Church in Pergola, Italy

Coordinates: 43°33′39″N 12°50′09″E

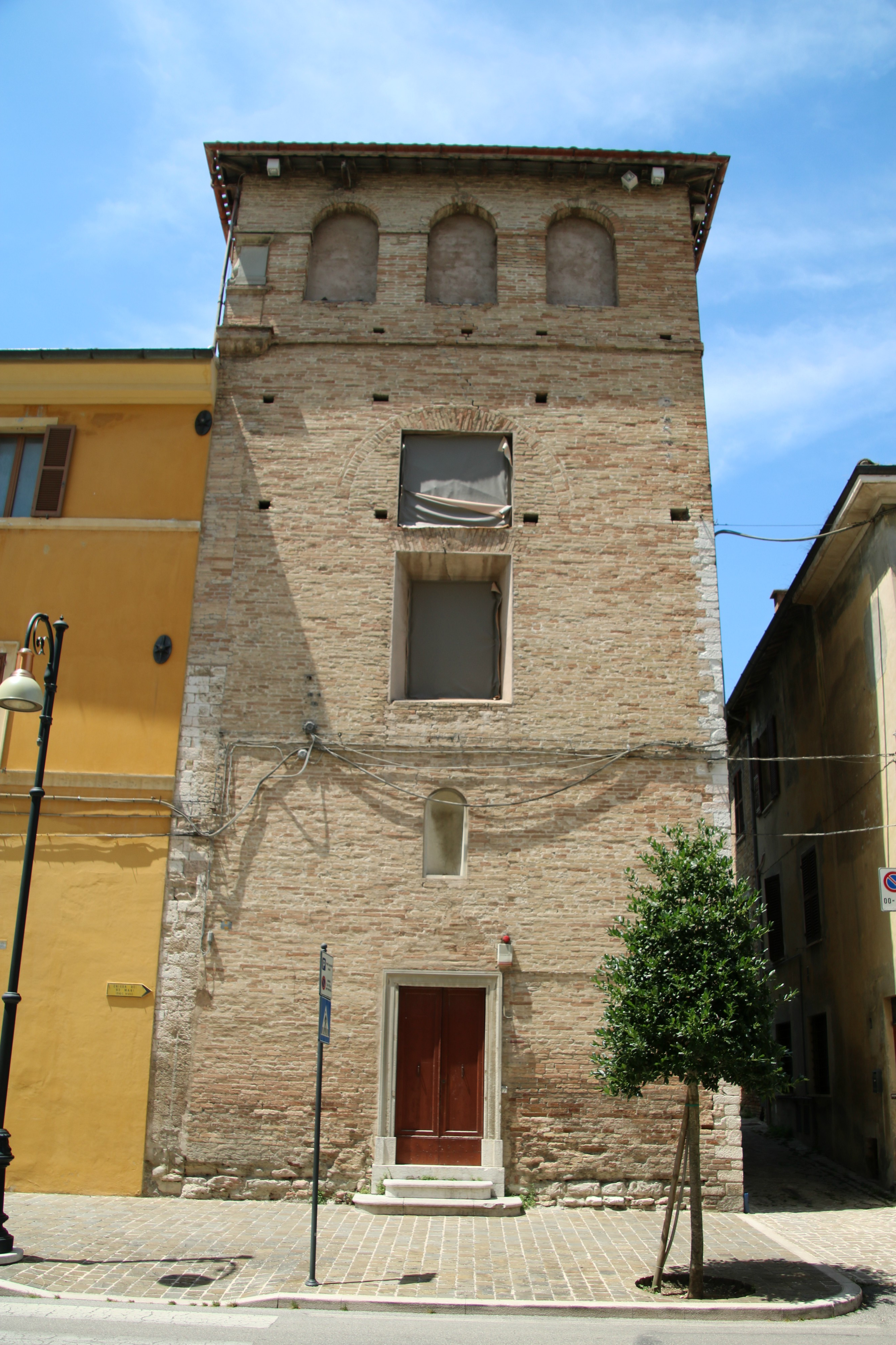
Chiesa dei Re Magi tower

The Chiesa dei Re Magi, also known as the chapel or Cappella dei Magi, is a Baroque-style, Roman Catholic chapel, located on Via Don Minzoni #84, in the town of Pergola, province of Pesaro and Urbino, region of Marche, Italy. The chapel, which has the external appearance of a three-story tower, was once a flanking private chapel of the church of San Pietro, which was torn down in 1840.

== Description ==
The chapel in its present configuration was refurbished in the second half of the 17th century, and the baroque interior is decorated with ornaments in stucco and stone, including statues of sybils and prophets, by Tommaso Amantini (1625-1675). The canvases span painters from the late 16th to early 18th centuries. The main altarpiece, which gives the chapel its name, is an Adoration of the Magi by Aurelio Lomi. The walls of the chapel have canvases depicting John the Baptist signaling Christ to the Apostles by Ercole Ramazzani, and a Baptism of Christ and Marriage at Cana by Giovanni Francesco Ferri. The chapel also contains a polychrome-painted gesso Pietà from the 15th century.
