= Della Pergola =

Della Pergola or Della pergola is an Italian surname. Notable people with the surname include:

- Delfino della Pergola (1398–1465), Roman Catholic prelate who served as Bishop of Modena and Parma
- Paolo della Pergola (? - 1455), Italian humanist philosopher, mathematician and Occamist logician
- Sergio Della Pergola (born 1942), Italian-Israeli demographer and statistician

== See also ==
- Pergola (disambiguation)
- Teatro della Pergola
