= Victor Honoré Janssens =

Flemish painter and tapestry designer (1658–1736)

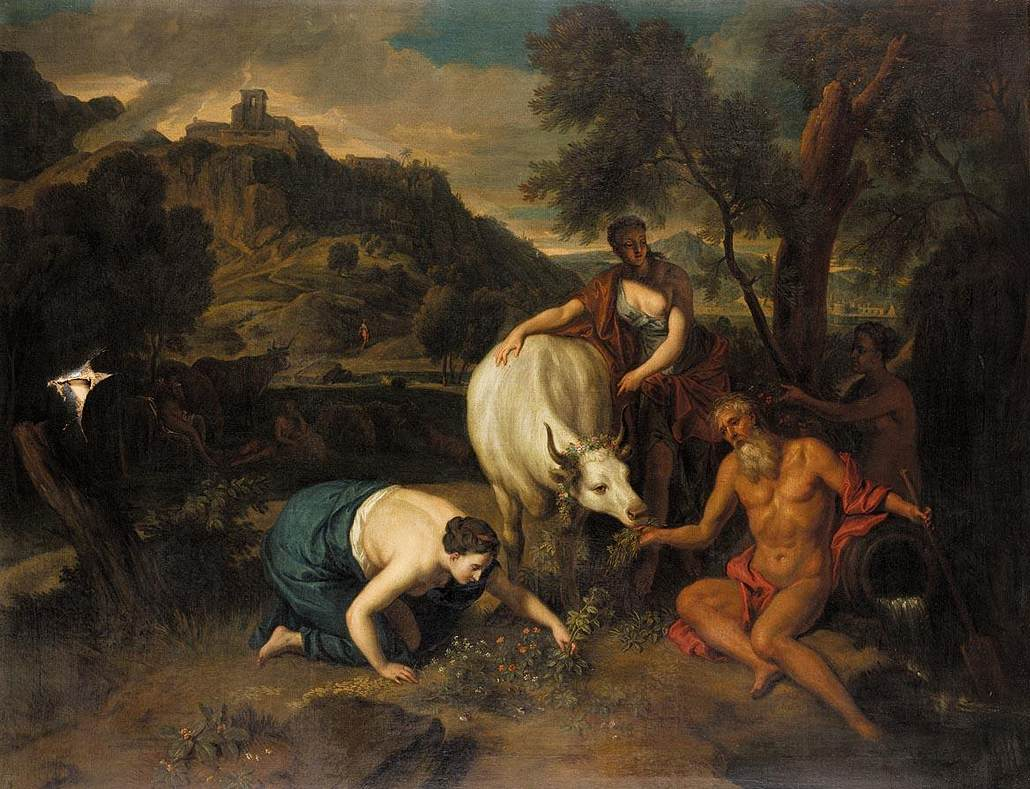
Io recognized by her father

Victor Honorius Janssens or Victor Honoré Janssens (or Jansens) (11 June 1658 – 14 August 1736) was a Flemish painter of religious and mythological works and a tapestry designer. He spent a substantial period of his career abroad and worked in Germany, Italy, Vienna and London. He was court painter of Emperor Charles VI of Austria in Vienna. He is mainly known for his mythological and history paintings.

== Life ==
Janssens was born in Brussels as the son of a tailor. He studied design and was entered as a pupil in the register of the Brussels Guild of Saint Luke in 1675. After working in the studio of Lancelot Volders, he spent some time in the district of Oldenburg (now in the German state of Lower Saxony). Here he was the court painter to Joachim Frederick, Duke of Schleswig-Holstein-Sonderburg-Plön. The Duke allowed him to visit Italy in 1681.

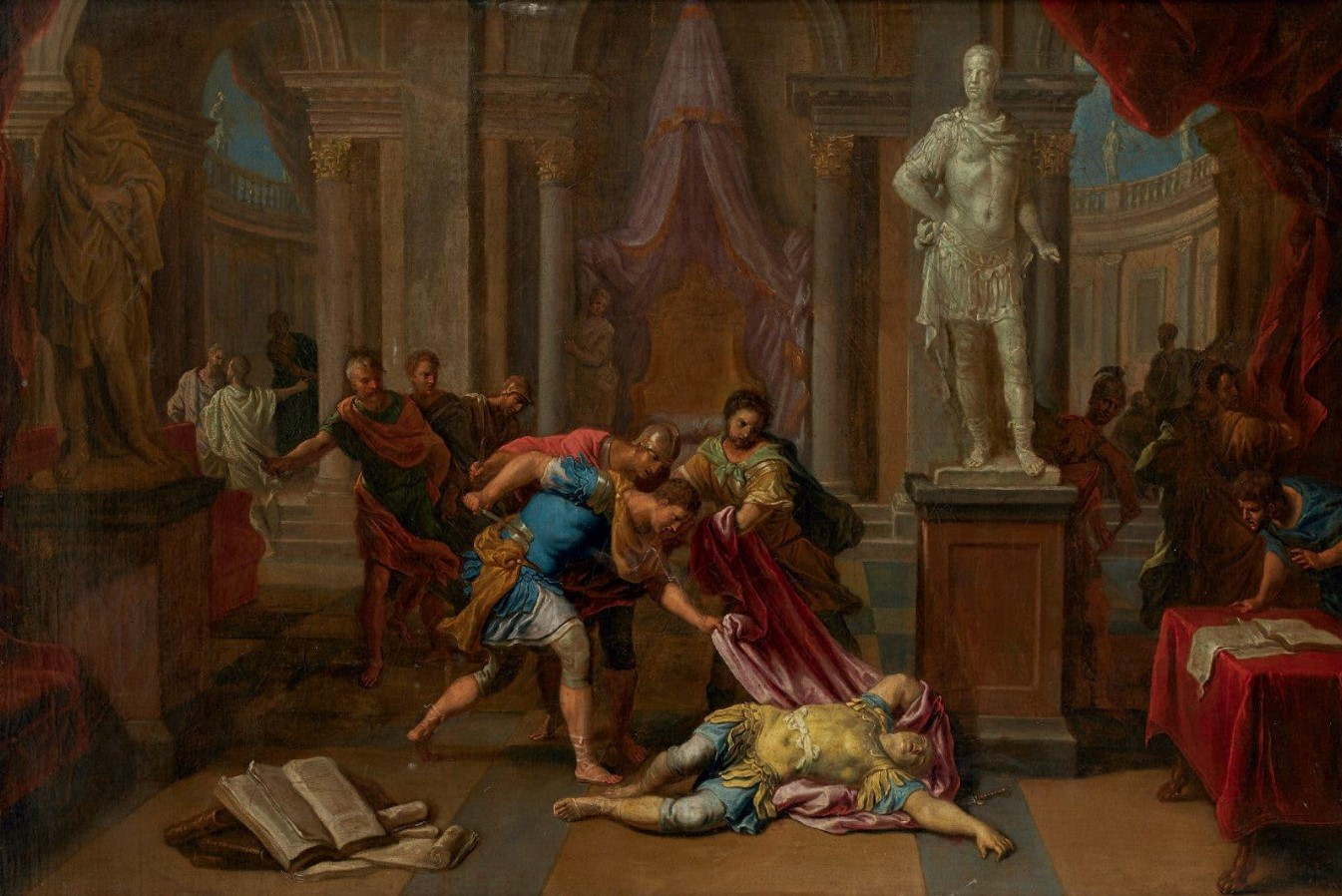
The death of Caesar

Janssens stayed for about nine years in Italy and visited the main capitals of the country to study the masters. It has been assumed that Janssens befriended the Dutch painter of landscapes and seascapes Pieter Mulier the younger in Rome and that he painted the figures in his landscapes. The scholar M. Röthlisberger-Bianco has rejected this assumption. While in Naples, Janssens obtained a major commission to paint a large altarpiece for the church of the Jesuits.

The artist returned in 1689 to Brussels and was admitted to the local Guild of St Luke on 12 August 1689. The next year he applied for permission to work as a cartoon painter for the Brussels tapestry works. He married Jacqueline, daughter of the notary Andé Van den Dycke and Christine Van den Eyndes on 14 March 1690.

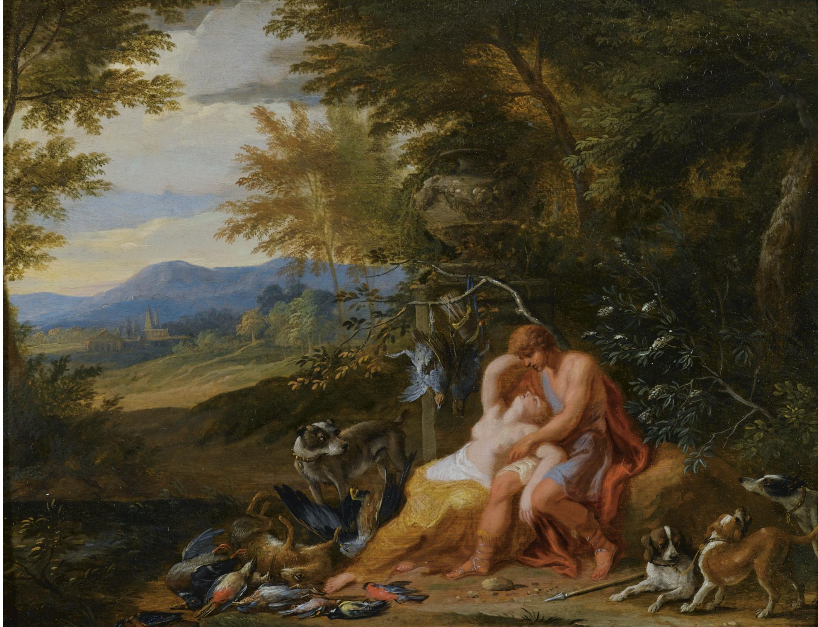
Venus and Adonis as lovers

Following the Bombardment of Brussels by the French in 1695, Janssens was commissioned to produce a number of paintings for the Brussels Town Hall to replace those destroyed during the attack on the city. He also worked for the local guilds and churches. He gained a solid reputation and became well-off. He was appointed the court painter of Emperor Charles VI of Austria and resided in Vienna from 1719 to 1722. On the recommendation of the Empress, the widow of Emperor Joseph I, he spent several years in London.

He spent his later years in Brussels, where he eventually died in 1736.

== Work ==
Janssens' principal works are the series of paintings which he produced for the Brussels Town Hall. He was mainly a painter of historical subjects. His style reflects trends in Italy of the late 17th century and a classical bias.

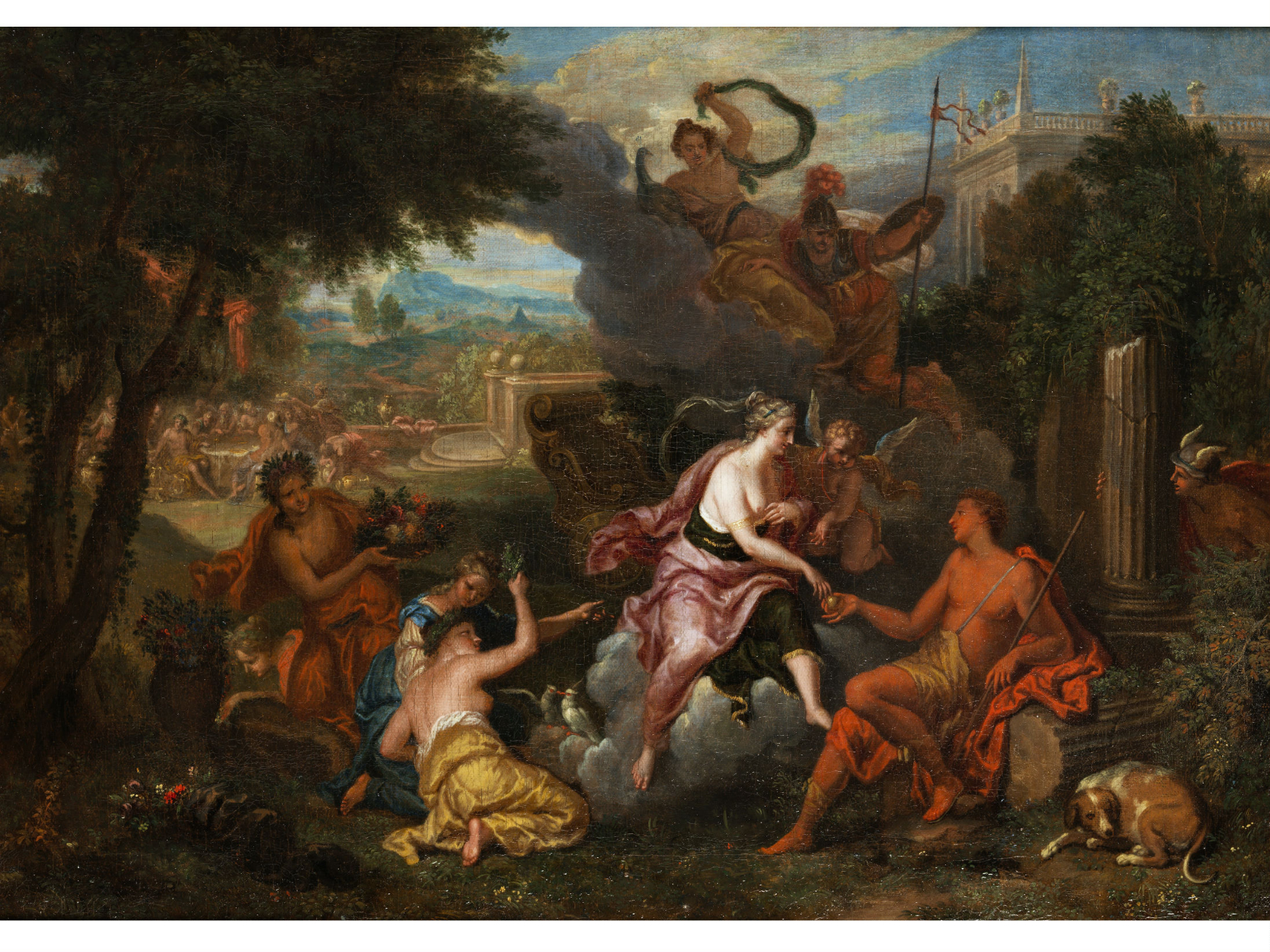
Venus mourning the death of Adonis

Two sets of cartoon series he produced for the Brussels tapestry workshops are recorded. A first commission in 1711 from the workshop of the brothers Urbanus and Daniel II Leyniers involved the painting of six designs in oil on canvas on Greek historical themes and was later referred to as "Famous men from Plutarch". The Leyniers brothers' workshop merged in 1712 with that of their cousin Hendrik II Reydams, which took over the cartoons. The number of cartoons was increased to 8 in 1715 and to eleven in 1734. Various editions of the tapestries have survived. Janssens executed the designs according to the fashion for classicist history painting and he developed the themes in wide and balanced compositions. The series shows Janssens' mature synthesis of historical and monumental painting. This series established Janssens' reputation as a designer of tapestries and he received in 1716 a commission from the States of Brabant to make designs for a series of tapestries on the history of the Duchy of Brabant. The designs were realised by the Leyniers-Reydams workshop the next year and still adorn the Brussels Town Hall. Recent investigations have shown that Janssens made the designs for three other tapestries: Zephyr abducts Psyche to an enchanted palace, Zephyr transports Psyches sisters to this palace and Psyche discovers the identity of Cupido (Paris, Louvre).
