= Portico of Pompey =

Quadriporticus in ancient Rome

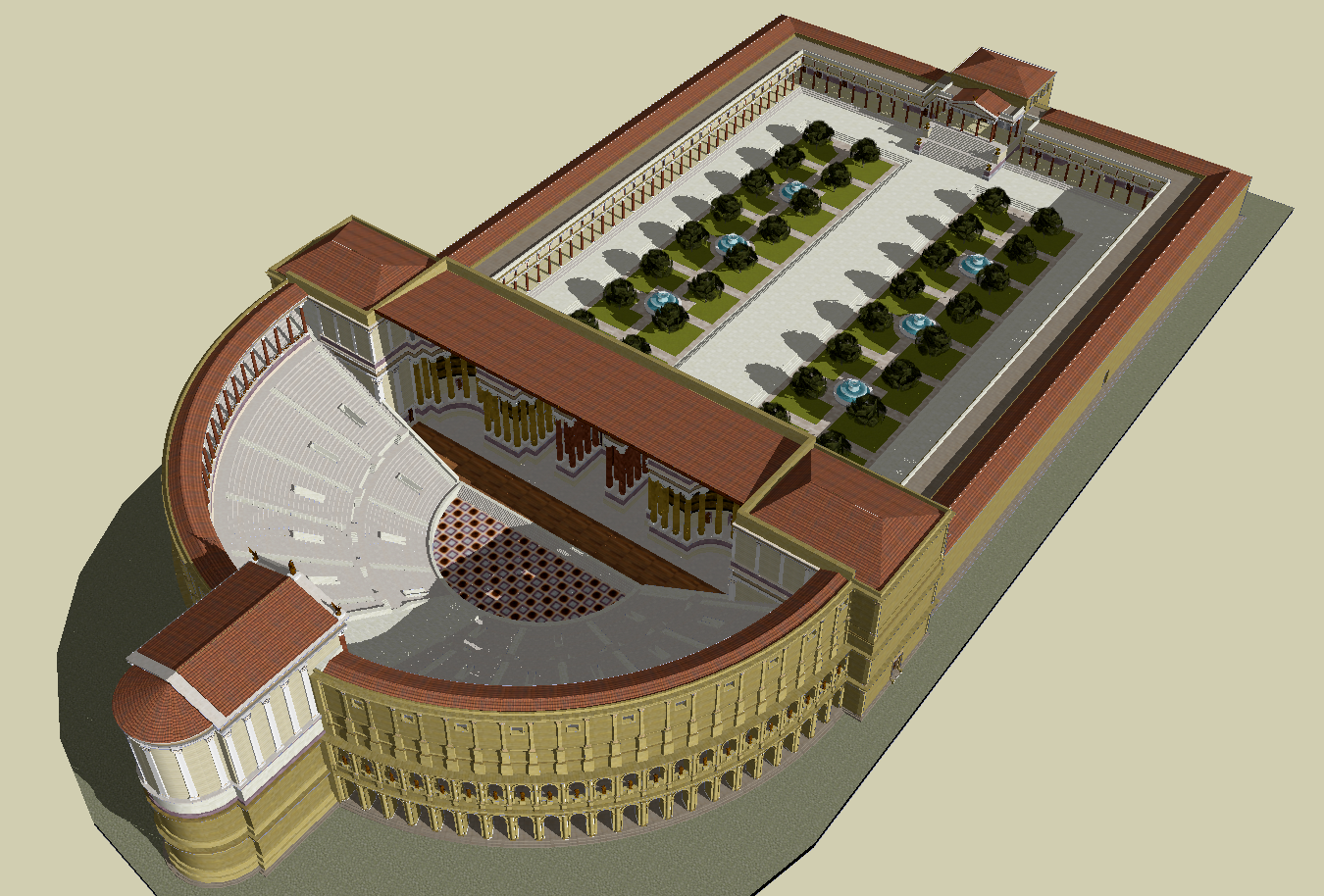

- Location within Rome
- 41.895°N 12.474°E
- Type: Portico
- Location: Regione IX Circus Flaminius

History
- Built: 62 BC
- Built by: Gnaeus Pompeius Magnus

The Portico of Pompey (Latin: Porticus Pompeii), also known as the Great Walkway (Ambulatio Magni) and Hall of a Hundred Pillars (Hecatostylon), was a large quadriporticus located directly behind the scaenae frons of the Theatre of Pompey. It enclosed a large and popular public garden in the ancient city of Rome. The porticus was dedicated in 55 BC. and has a history spanning hundreds of years. The colonnades contained arcades and galleries that displayed sculptures and paintings collected from years of war campaigns of its patron and builder, Gnaeus Pompeius Magnus. Over time the site became rows of shops that occupied what were the galleries and arcades. As the ground level rose from constant flooding from the Tiber River, much of the original architectural elements were re-used by shop owners to adorn their structures at higher levels. Today, many of these shops still exist and fragments of the old theatre and porticus can be seen embedded in the ancient walls of many of the buildings.

== History ==
The ancient city of Rome was designed with covered walkways, public gardens as well as large pools and fountains that were common by the 1st century AD. Citizens would stroll throughout the city under these colonnades, shaded from the sun and rain. The first and most popular of these gardens was located in the quadriporticus that Pompey built to adjoin the theatre that also bore his name.

Pompey, impressed or inspired by what he saw during his years of travel and campaigning for Rome, returned with a desire to build a monument to himself larger than any other before. A theatre, porticus and curia were built in a huge complex that became a symbol of Roman culture for centuries and was emulated across the Republic and empire.

== Architecture ==
The entrance to the theatre complex was tightly controlled at either side of the Curia of Pompey. This was to guide the visitor's sight directly along the inner garden area to the main doorway (regia) to the stage of the theatre and up to the temple of Venus Victrix. This sightline was permanently disrupted in 32 BC when Augustus had a stone scaena built.
