= Lucius Minucius Basilus =

Lucius Minucius Basilus (died summer 43 BC) was a military commander and politician of the late Roman Republic, a trusted associate of Julius Caesar, who later participated in Caesar's assassination.

It was to Basilus that Cicero wrote his first excited note after hearing of the assassination of Caesar. In the notes to Cicero's Selected Letters, Basilus is described:

L. Minucius Basilus had been a prominent officer, probably a legatus under Caesar in Gaul, and apparently served also in Caesar's Civil War. He was, however, mortally offended because Caesar would not give him a province after his praetorship in 45 BC, but only a sum of money in return for his services, and so joined the conspiracy against him.

Basilus, denied a provincial command despite being a praetor, was insulted that Caesar tried to placate him with money, causing him to join the conspiracy. In 43 BC, he was killed by some of his own slaves whom he had punished by mutilation. He should probably be distinguished from L. Minucius Basilus, who took the name (instead of M. Satrius) on his adoption by a rich uncle, [and] mentioned as assuming by force the position of patronus over certain towns in Italy.

In some older sources, such as the Dictionary of Greek and Roman Biography and Mythology, his name is rendered as "Bacillus" instead of "Basilus".

== See also ==
- Liberatores
- Assassination of Julius Caesar
