= Pergola, Marche =

Commune in Marche

Pergola
- Comune
- Città di Pergola
- Location within Italy Location within Marche
- Coordinates: 43°34′N 12°50′E
- Country: Italy
- Region: Marche
- Province: Pesaro e Urbino (PU)
- Frazioni: Bellisio Alto, Bellisio Solfare, Cartoceto, Fenigli, Madonna del Piano, Mezzanotte, Montaiate, Monterolo, Montesecco, Montevecchio, Pantana, Pantana Serralta, Percozzone

Government
  - Mayor: Diego Sabbatucci (Pergola nel cuore, Centre-right)

Area
  - Total: 113 km^{2} (44 sq mi)
- Elevation: 265 m (869 ft)

Population (May 2007)
  - Total: 6,786
  - Density: 60.1/km^{2} (156/sq mi)
- Demonym: Pergolesi
- Time zone: UTC+1 (CET)
  - Summer (DST): UTC+2 (CEST)
- Postal code: 61045
- Dialing code: 0721
- Patron saint: St. Secundus
- Saint day: 1 June
- Website: Official website

Pergola is a comune (municipality) in the Province of Pesaro e Urbino in the Italian region Marche. It is one of I Borghi più belli d'Italia ("The most beautiful villages of Italy").

The Gilt Bronzes of Cartoceto di Pergola were discovered in the communal territory in 1946. They are now exhibited in a museum at Pergola.

== Main sights ==
- Museo Bronzi Dorati, Pergola . It houses the Gilt Bronzes from Cartoceto di Pergola.
- Church of Saint Andrea
- Church of Saint Francesco
- Church of Saint Giacomo
- Church of Saint Maria di Piazza
- Town hall
- Chiesa dei Re Magi
- Santa Maria della Tinte
- House of Alessandro Agosteo
