= George Edward Robertson =

British painter (1864–1920)

George Edward Robertson (1864–1920) was a British painter, best remembered for his oil paintings of Julius Caesar and Mark Antony. He exhibited regularly at the Royal Academy of Arts in London from 1885 to 1904.
