= Exile of Ovid =

Exile of Ovid from Rome to Tomis (now Romania) by emperor Augustus

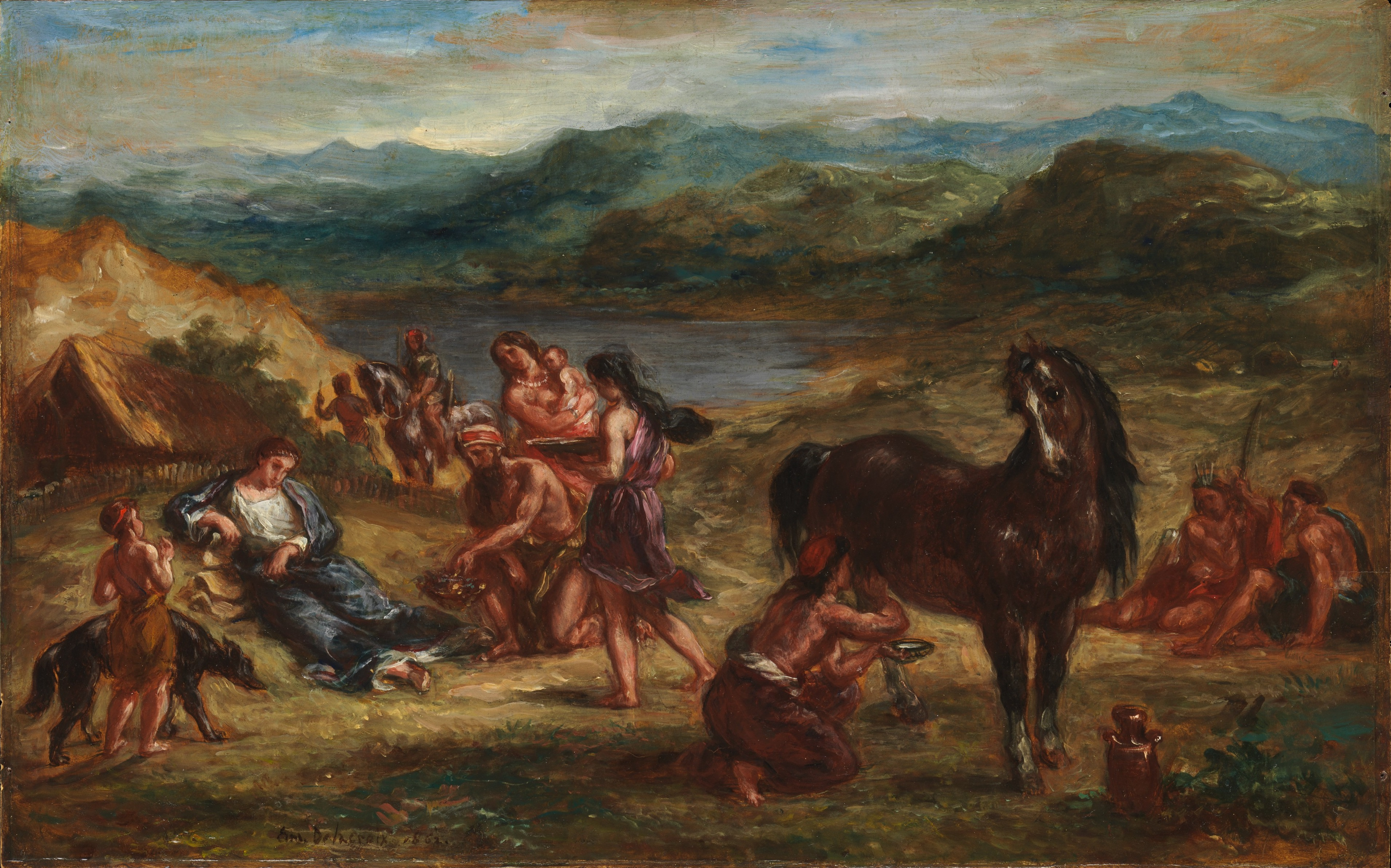
Eugène Delacroix, Ovid among the Scythians, 1862, Oil on wood, Metropolitan Museum of Art

Ovid, the Latin poet of the Roman Empire, was banished in 8 AD from Rome to Tomis (now Constanța, Romania) by decree of the emperor Augustus. The reasons for his banishment are uncertain. Ovid's exile is related by the poet himself, and also in brief references to the event by Pliny the Elder and Statius. At the time, Tomis was a remote town on the edge of the civilized world; it was loosely under the authority of the Kingdom of Thrace (a satellite state of Rome), and was superficially Hellenized. According to Ovid, none of its citizens spoke Latin, which as an educated Roman, he found trying. Ovid wrote that the cause of his exile was carmen et error ("a poem and an error"), probably the Ars Amatoria and a personal indiscretion or mistake.

Ovid was one of the most prolific poets of his time, and before being banished had already composed his most famous poems – Heroides, Amores, Ars Amatoria, Remedia Amoris, Medicamina Faciei Femineae, his lost tragedy Medea, the ambitious Metamorphoses and the Fasti. The latter two works were left, respectively, without a final revision and only half finished. In exile, the poet continued producing works that survive today: Ibis, Tristia, Epistulae ex Ponto, and possibly several other, minor poems. These works consist of letters to friends and enemies, and also depict the poet's treatment by the Scythians – particularly the Getae, a nomadic people related to the Dacians or Thracians.

Ovid's poems in exile have been seen as of fundamental importance for the study of the Roman aristocracy under Augustus and Tiberius, furnishing "precious pieces of information about events and persons". His work continued to serve as a literary influence on Latin writers who also experienced exile, from Seneca to Boethius. It was also a central point of reference for medieval imaginings of exile, as it was for Romantic portrayals of misunderstood genius. In modern times, classicists have questioned whether the exile was merely a farce, a misrepresentation by Ovid, or a rhetorical and literary device.

== Background ==
At the age of 50, Ovid, the most famous poet of his time, was banished from Rome to the remote town of Tomis on the Black Sea. This happened to Ovid in the year 8 AD by the exclusive intervention of the Emperor Augustus, without the participation of the Senate or of any Roman judge, and was the ruin of his ambitious hopes.

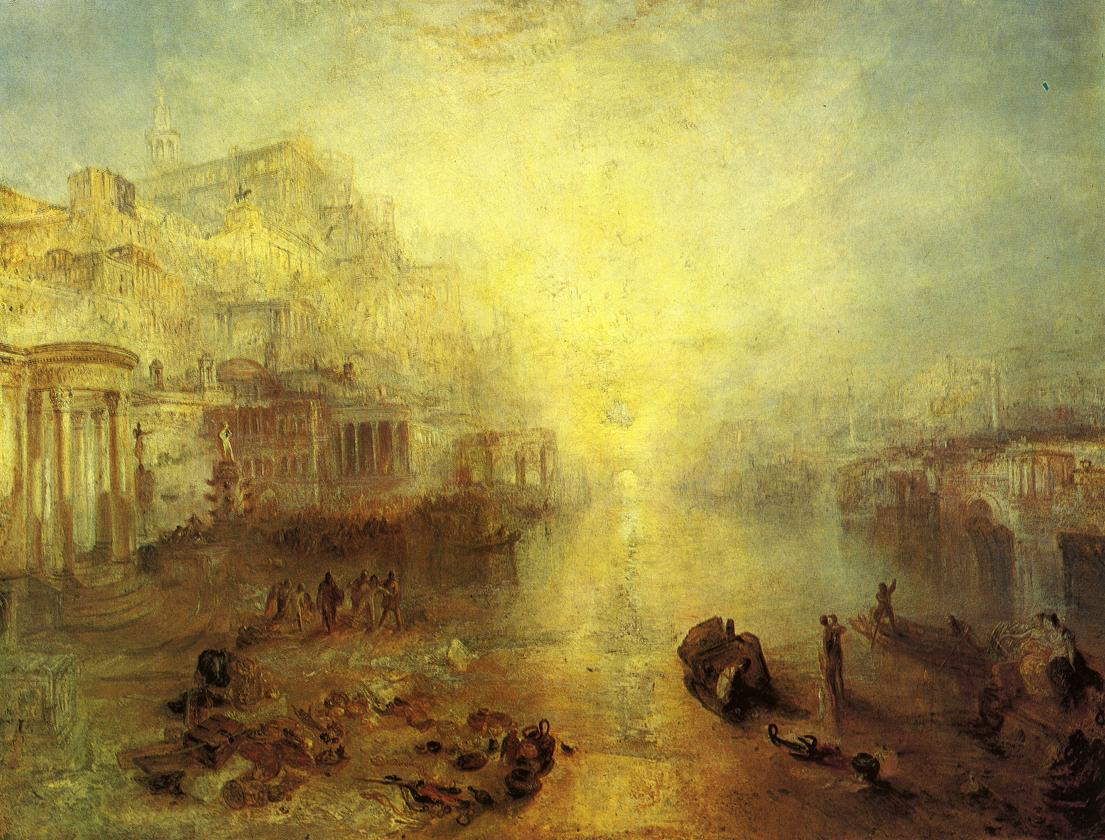
J. M. W. Turner, Ovid Banished from Rome, 1838

Ovid wrote later that the reason for his exile was carmen et error ("a poem and a mistake"), claiming that what he did was nothing illegal, but worse than murder, more harmful than poetry. The poems of his Tristia, however, are full of declarations that it was not a crime, just a mistake caused by stupidity, that it was done without premeditation, and that the mistake's nature was that Ovid had seen something. He repeatedly says that the emperor must realize that because he has only exiled the poet without putting him to death, confiscating his possessions, or depriving him of Roman citizenship.

== Causes of the exile ==
The carmen to which Ovid referred has been identified as Ars Amatoria (The Art of Love), written some seven years before his exile. However, Ovid expresses surprise that only he has been exiled for such a reason since many others also wrote obscene verse, seemingly with the emperor's approval. Scholars have argued that Ovid's real crime was "lèse-majesté". Augustus was presenting himself as the restorer of Roman public morality and could not fail to punish an author of such standing who represented himself in the Ars Amatoria as a promoter of adultery in defiance of the Emperor.

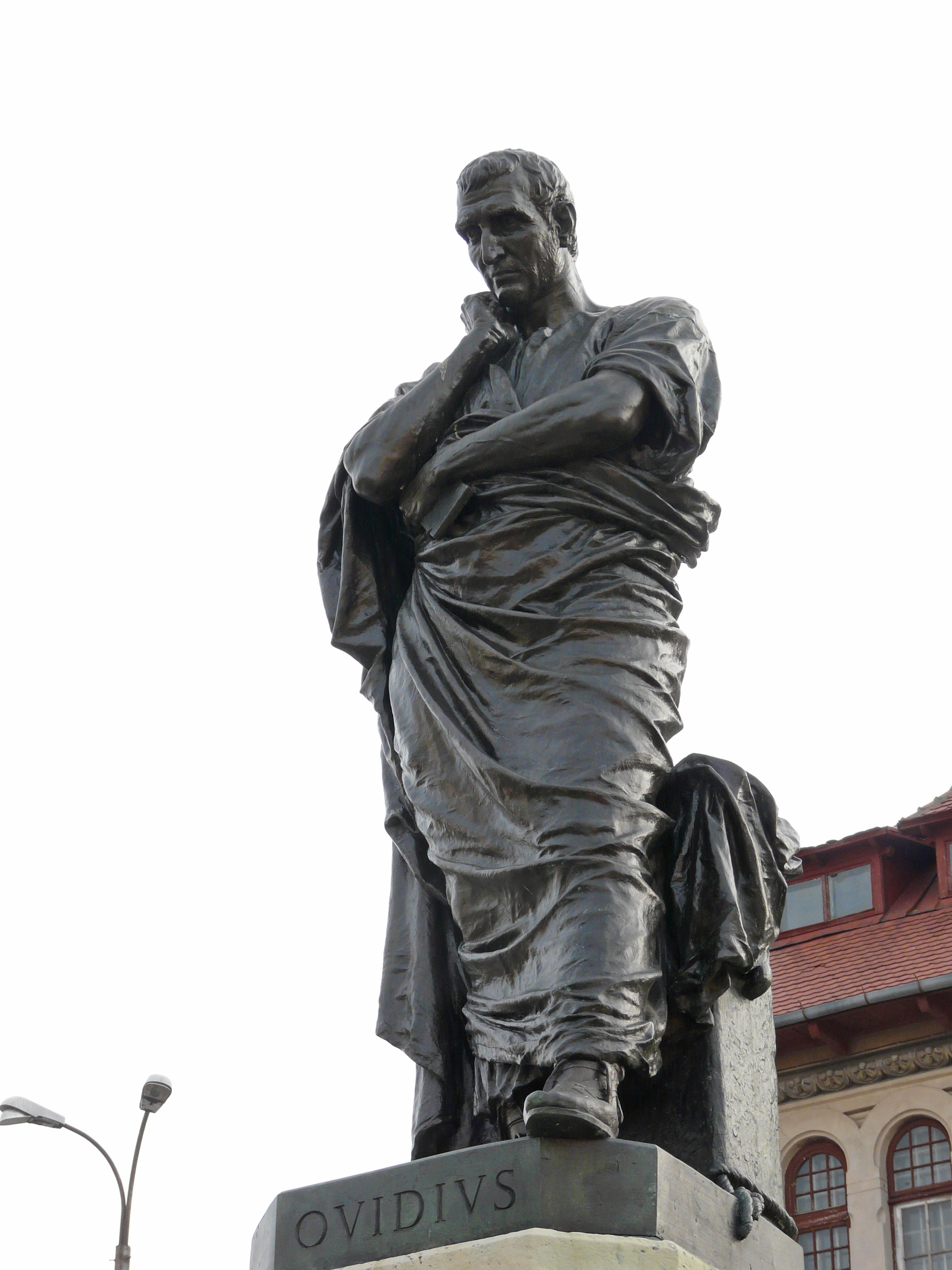
View of Ovid's statue in Tomis/Constanța

Speculations about the nature of Ovid's "mistake" have differed over the centuries. They have included:

- sexual:
  - Ovid had discovered that Augustus had committed incest with his own daughter, Julia the Elder, or with his granddaughter Julia the Younger;
  - Ovid had engaged in adultery with these ladies himself or had been witness to their adultery with someone else.
- political:
  - Ovid had frequented circles that politically opposed the emperor, such as that of Lucius Aemilius Paullus, who conspired with others to restore the right of imperial succession to Agrippa Postumus, grandson of Augustus.

In such a case, objection to Ars Amatoria was a mere pretext, concealing the real cause of Ovid's condemnation, considering the time that had elapsed between the publication of this work and the sentence of Augustus. To support this view, some authors note that the "Art of Love" was no more indecent than many publications by Propertius, Tibullus and Horace circulating freely at that time. Proponents also believe that foreseeing the consequences of the themes of his first poems, Ovid had already changed his artistic focus and written works with less sexual themes, such as Metamorphoses, with the deification of Julius Caesar and the glorification of Augustus, and the Fasti, which are dedicated to Roman festivals of his time.

Another political suggestion has been that Ovid was an intellectual objector against authoritarianism.

=== Falsehood thesis ===
==== Poetic fiction ====
A more recent thesis has been that Ovid's exile was not real. Early in the 20th century, J. J. Hartman argued that Ovid never left Rome for exile and that all of his works referring to it are imaginative and humorous fiction. This theory was debated during the 1930s, especially by certain Dutch authors.^{[b]} In 1951, a similar theory was proposed by O. Janssen.

In a 1985 article, A.D. Fitton Brown also argued that Ovid's exile was fictional. The reasons advanced by Brown are as follows:

1. That, except for doubtful passages in Pliny the Elder and Statius, no other historian mentioned it until the beginning of the 5th century.
2. That Ovid's descriptions of Tomis were already available to him in Roman authors.
3. That the poet was already adept at projecting a persona separate from personal life.

Brown's hypothesis opened a debate over the accuracy of the ancient poets when dealing with historical facts. Roman poets themselves wrote about this gap between biography and invention. Modern authors suggest that Ovid's treatment of Augustus in Tristia, chiefly as a character and only secondarily as the addressee, are a reminder that these letters are literature first and foremost and that one cannot assume that they were intended to obtain an actual recall. Ovid seems rather to be inventing poetic fiction.

==== Fasti and Ibis ====
Orthodox scholars, however, are opposed to such hypotheses. One of their main arguments is that Ovid would not have let his Fasti remain unfinished since the poem was meant to seal his consecration as an imperial poet. Nevertheless, although this work gives the clearest testimony of support of Augustan ideals, it has also been commented that passage 3.371–80 of the Fasti is evidence of resistance to the Augustan succession.

Traditionally, it is argued that in the circumstances of being far from Rome, Ovid had no access to libraries and thus might have been forced to abandon his poem about the Roman calendar, of which only the first six books (January through June) exist. In addition both the Metamorphoses and Fasti seem to lack evidence of a final revision, as Ovid himself claims in the Tristia. Moreover, parts of these two poems may have been rewritten by him in Tomis, while Heroides 16–21 may have been entirely composed during his exile.

However, this hypothesis of a lack of scholarly documentation in Tomis does not seem able to stand when one considers the development of a poem so far-fetched as Ibis, with its encyclopaedic cargo of Alexandrian mythological knowledge. Other authors believe that the enemy in Ibis is not a real person. There is, in any case, another explanation for the abandonment of writing the Fasti. B. R. Nagle suggests the possibility that Ovid conceived the idea of writing this work as early as 8 BC when Augustus, the new Pontifex Maximus, corrected the defects resulting from the introduction of the Julian calendar. Nagle also argues that political motivations may have caused the poet to link the work with the year 4 AD, when Tiberius was adopted by Augustus and therefore implicitly named his successor. Ovid may then have lost his enthusiasm for the Julian dynasty and transferred his support to the lineage of Claudius, leaving unfinished the poem he was meditating.

=== Works ===
Ovid made banishment the subject of his last three major works of poetry: the Ibis, a "venomous attack on an unnamed enemy", and the two collections of literary epistles, Tristia and Epistulae ex Ponto.

The Ibis, an elegiac curse poem attacking an adversary at home, was written during the journey to his place of exile, although it has been argued that this work was "literary rather than personal". In fact, Callimachus had already written a poem with the same title attacking Apollonius of Rhodes. Caelius Rhodiginus (Antiq. Lect. xiii. 1) says, on the authority of Caecilius Minutianus Apuleius, that the enemy was Marcus Valerius Messalla Corvinus.

The five books of the elegiac Tristia are dated to 9–12 AD, during the first four years of Ovid's banishment. They are a series of poems expressing the poet's despair in exile and advocating his return to Rome. Its advocacy of his literary worth perhaps goes too far when compared to that of Augustus's favorite, Virgil, particularly with his magnum opus the Aeneid. The tenth elegy of the fourth book is valuable because it contains many particulars of Ovid's life.

The Epistulae ex Ponto, a series of letters in verse explicitly addressed to various people in Rome, asking them to help effect Ovid's return, are thought to be his last compositions. The first three books were published in 13 AD, and the fourth book later, between 14 and 16 AD. Some of these compositions were addressed to Ovid's friends, to his wife, and to the Emperor himself: "Where's the joy in stabbing your steel into my dead flesh? / There's no place left where I can be dealt fresh wounds."

According to Pliny the Elder, Ovid wrote another poem about fishing while in exile. A fragmentary poem still exists, traditionally attributed to Ovid, called Halieutica, about the "rules for fishing in rocky, sandy or open waters, distinguishing the kinds of fish which haunt each", possibly written with information from local fishers. However, the real authorship of this work is much debated, and Ovid's is denied or doubted by some scholars.

=== Literary assessment ===
In his works from exile, principally the Tristia and the Epistulae, Ovid tried to do three things that he hoped would help convince the emperor to end his exile:

- Create pity for himself through his descriptions of the hazards and harsh conditions in Tomis. Ovid portrayed himself as old, sick, and away from his family and the pleasures of Rome;
- Defend his cause by referring repeatedly to the attitude that led to his exile as stupid, but without any malicious intent, and by referring to his offense as an "error";
- Compliment the emperor, either directly (by praising the emperor's good qualities), or indirectly, by praising the emperor's family, or the successes of the emperor's campaigns.

Much has been written suggesting that what Ovid wrote during this period is entirely different from his earlier works. According to Ovid himself, his exile ruined his former poetic genius.

== See also ==
- Augustan literature
- Latin literature
- Relegatio

== Bibliography ==
- Ovid: Tristia (Tris.) and Epistulae ex Ponto
- John C. Thibault, The Mystery of Ovid's Exile (University of California Press, Cambridge University Press, 1964)
- H. De la Ville de Mirmont, La jeunesse d’Ovide (Paris 1905)
- A. L. Wheeler, "Topics from the life of Ovid," American Journal of Philology 46 (1925) 1–28
- Oliver Taplin, Literature in the Greek and Roman Worlds: A New Perspective (Oxford University Press, 2000)
- Ronald Syme, History in Ovid (Oxford: Clarendon Press 1978)
- Jan Felix Gaertner, Writing exile: the discourse of displacement in Greco-Roman antiquity and beyond (BRILL, 2007). ISBN 90-04-15515-5
- Peter Green (ed.), Ovid, The poems of exile: Tristia and the Black Sea letters (University of California Press, 2005). ISBN 0-520-24260-2
