= Ovid Among the Scythians =

Two paintings by Eugène Delacroix

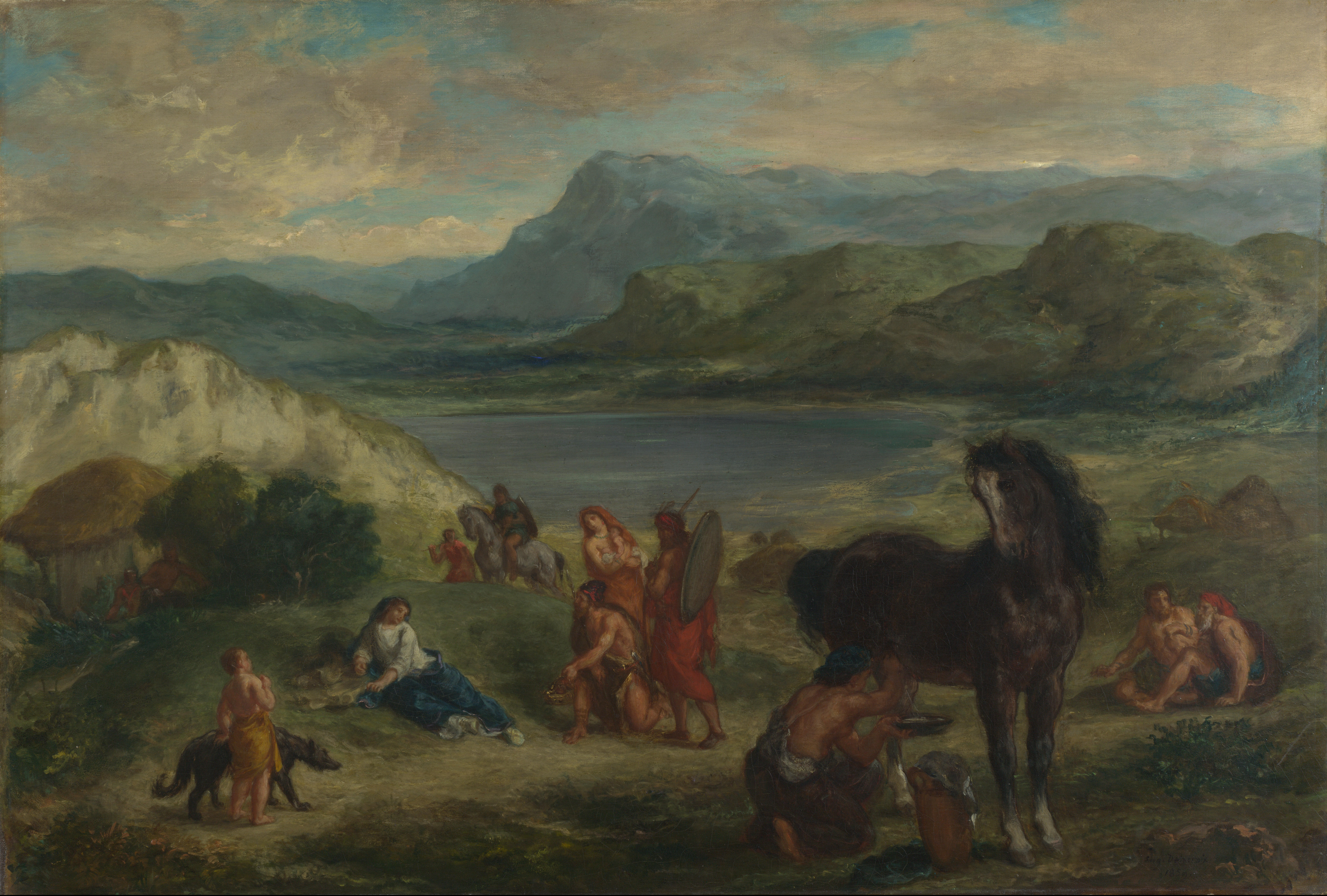
- Artist: Eugène Delacroix
- Year: 1859
- Medium: Oil on canvas
- Dimensions: 87.6 cm × 130.2 cm (34.5 in × 51.3 in)
- Location: National Gallery, London

Ovid Among the Scythians
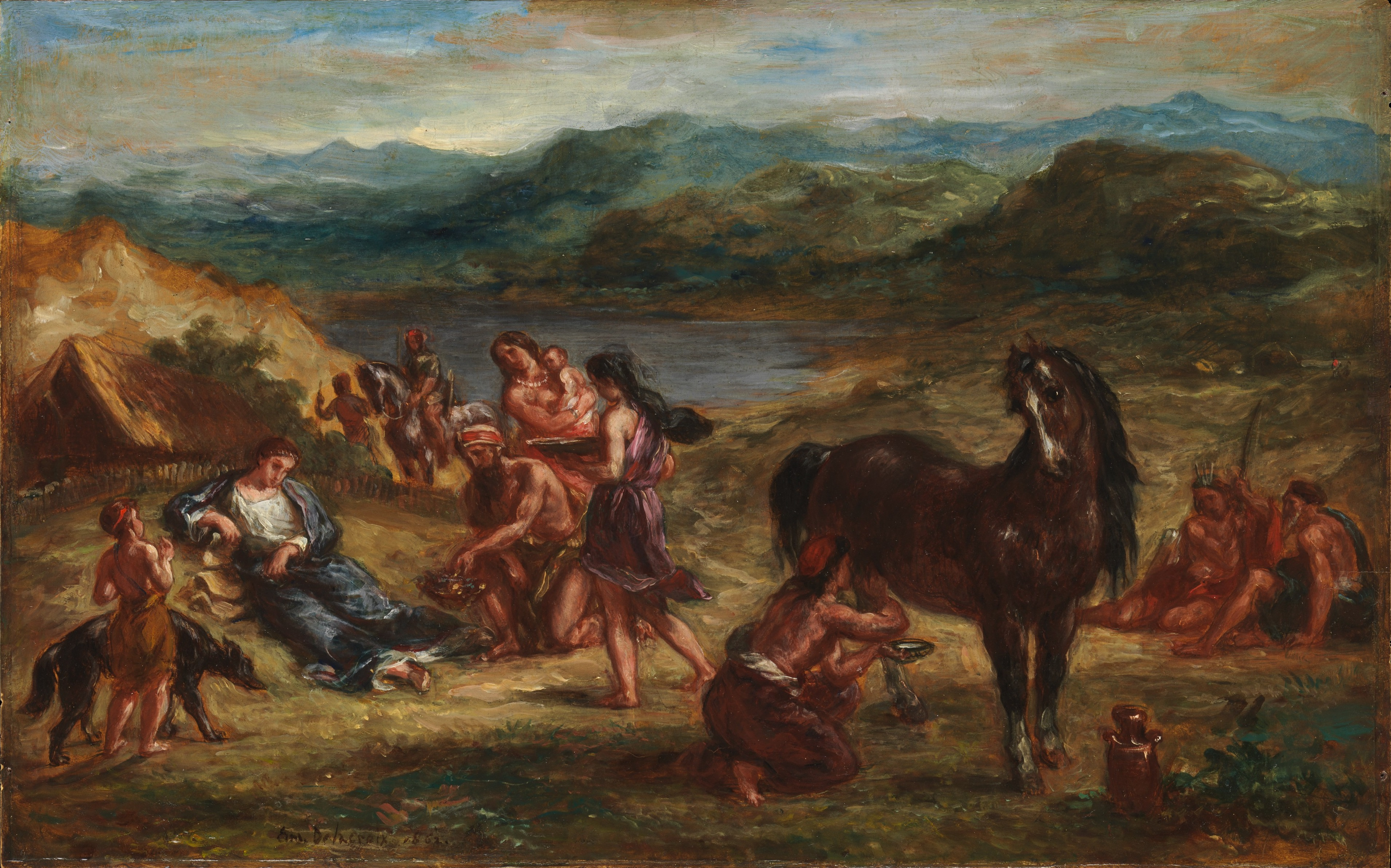
- Artist: Eugène Delacroix
- Year: 1862
- Type: Oil on wood
- Dimensions: 32.1 cm × 50.2 cm (12.6 in × 19.8 in)
- Location: Metropolitan Museum of Art, New York City

Ovid Among the Scythians is the title of two oil paintings by the French artist Eugène Delacroix, executed in 1859 and 1862. The less famous second version was painted to integrate the figures and landscape and rectified the problems of scale of the first version, which had an unusual composition and strange scale of the characters, provoking negative criticism, even among Delacroix's admirers such as Charles Baudelaire and Théophile Gautier, although artists such as Edgar Degas were deeply impressed.

Delacroix painted this subject first in 1844 as part of the decorations for the ceiling of the Library of the Palais Bourbon in Paris, in a painting there titled Ovid Chez Les Barbares. They depict the life of the Ancient Roman poet Ovid when exiled by the Emperor Augustus to the Black Sea port of Tomis, in what was then part of Scythia and is now south-east Romania, where he spent his last eight years and wrote poems such as Tristia and Epistulae ex Ponto. The Scythians were an ancient Iranic people whose way of life was described by Herodotus in his Histories as "nomadic"; Ovid himself called them a "wild tribe".

However, with its cultured man standing before barbarous people, the 1859 picture show the Scythians treating the poet with sympathy and curiosity, and is a fine treatment of the theme of civilisation confronted with barbarity. Henri Loyrette wrote:

Low but sometimes steep mountains covered with scrubby vegetation surround a still, shallow lake, boggy at its edges; scattered huts built precariously of wood and thatch suggest a pastoral and nomadic culture. In the foreground a man milks a large mare; behind him, various figures are casually placed, squatting, walking or standing still – a child, an old man, a nursling in its mother's arms, soldiers, resting shepherds. And, dolefully stretched out on a gentle incline, swathed in drapery, lies the figure identified by the painting's title as Ovid. He appears like a fallen meteorite on whom converge the friendly but startled inhabitants of this savage country. Delacroix has given him the pose of a Madonna in a Nativity [...].

The first version was exhibited in the Paris Salon of 1859, the last in which Delacroix participated. The composition reinterprets ideas that Delacroix had previously used in decorative compositions such as The Massacre at Chios, The Death of Sardanapalus and The Entry of the Crusaders in Constantinople. At the time of its exhibition, the landscape with its mountains was "universally" praised, while the mare in the foreground was thought strange by some. Théophile Gautier, for example, admired the painting, but ironically called the mare la femelle du cheval de Troie ("the female of the trojan horse"). Maxime Du Camp was the author of the harshest criticism, calling the painting "a spectacle of irremissible decadence" and advising the painter "to return to the literary works that he loves and to the music for which he was certainly born". Baudelaire, in his last Salon criticism, called the painting "one of these amazing works" and said that "Delacroix knows the design and painting". He also wrote a long essay on the life of an exiled poet and quoted Chateaubriand's epic Les Martyrs to evoke "the landscape, its solitude, its calm charm". Zacharie Astruc, in his first Salon criticism, praised all the details in the picture: Ovid ("what noble elegance!"); the mare ("what color and air around it!"); the dog, which made him think of classical sculpture; the water ("a strange beauty"); and, above all, the landscape. In the catalog, by Delacroix himself, was written: "Some examine him [Ovid] with interest, others go home and offer wild fruit and mare's milk, etc., etc."

The wildness and the misunderstood genius were key concepts in Romanticism and are very well portrayed in these two paintings by Delacroix. The second version, contrary to what one might think, is not an oil sketch but a completed version which develops many elements of the London work. Delacroix painted it with more vivid colors, replaced the barbarian with a shield on the back by a woman bringing food, and also closely integrated the figures and landscape in a manner that is more in keeping with a historical landscape. It was painted a year before his death, in 1862, most probably for a private collector. It was given to Metropolitan Museum of Art, New York, in honor of Philippe de Montebello, in 2008. According to the art historian Gary Tinterow, "This is his late, final statement on a theme that interested him his whole life."
