= Sextus Pompeius (consul 14) =

Roman senator

Sextus Pompeius was a Roman senator who lived during the 1st century BC and into the 1st century AD. He appeared to have a witty character and to be very intelligent. Sextus was a patron of literature and the Roman poet Ovid addressed to him four poems when he was living in exile. These poems were collected in the fourth book of Epistulae ex Ponto.

His relationship to the homonymous consul of 35 BC is problematic. Some authors infer he was his son. However, Ronald Syme notes "an intermediate generation should be allowed for, as happens in the stemmata of other noble families." Based on Cassius Dio's assertion that this Sextus Pompeius had a connection to the imperial family, Syme catalogues some possible individuals who could have been his mother. Some authorities follow Bartolomeo Borghesi and assert she was the daughter of Lucius Marcius Philippus suffect consul in 38 BC. Syme suggests she might be the daughter of Sextus Appuleius, consul in 29 BC or the daughter of that consul's brother, Marcus Appuleius consul in 20 BC.

Sextus served as consul in AD 14 with Sextus Appuleius. The two men held office when the first Roman emperor, Augustus, died, and they were the first to swear allegiance to the new Emperor, Tiberius, Augustus’ adopted son and successor. At the funeral of Augustus, Sextus broke his leg.

In Tiberius’ reign, he was one of seven witnesses of the Senatus consultum de Cn. Pisone patre, the Roman Senate's official act concerning the trial and punishment of Gnaeus Calpurnius Piso; the act was published on 10 December AD 20. Later, Sextus served as proconsul of Asia from 24 to 26.

Seneca the Younger alludes to the wealth of a Pompeius, whose domains included the sources and mouths of rivers, then contrasts this with Caligula taking him into his palace and starving Pompeius to death, then arranging a public funeral for his victim. Although experts often identify Seneca's reference to a Pompeius with this Sextus Pompeius, Syme points out this would lead to "interesting (or rather intolerable) consequences for the chronology of Valerius Maximus", and argues the Pompeius Caligula was so inhospitable to was an otherwise unattested son.

== Sources ==
- Westphal, Heiko. (2023). Sextus Pompeius (Consul of 14 CE). https://doi.org/10.1002/9781444338386.wbeah55196
