= Valerius Maximus =

Early 1st century AD Roman professional rhetorician, historian and author

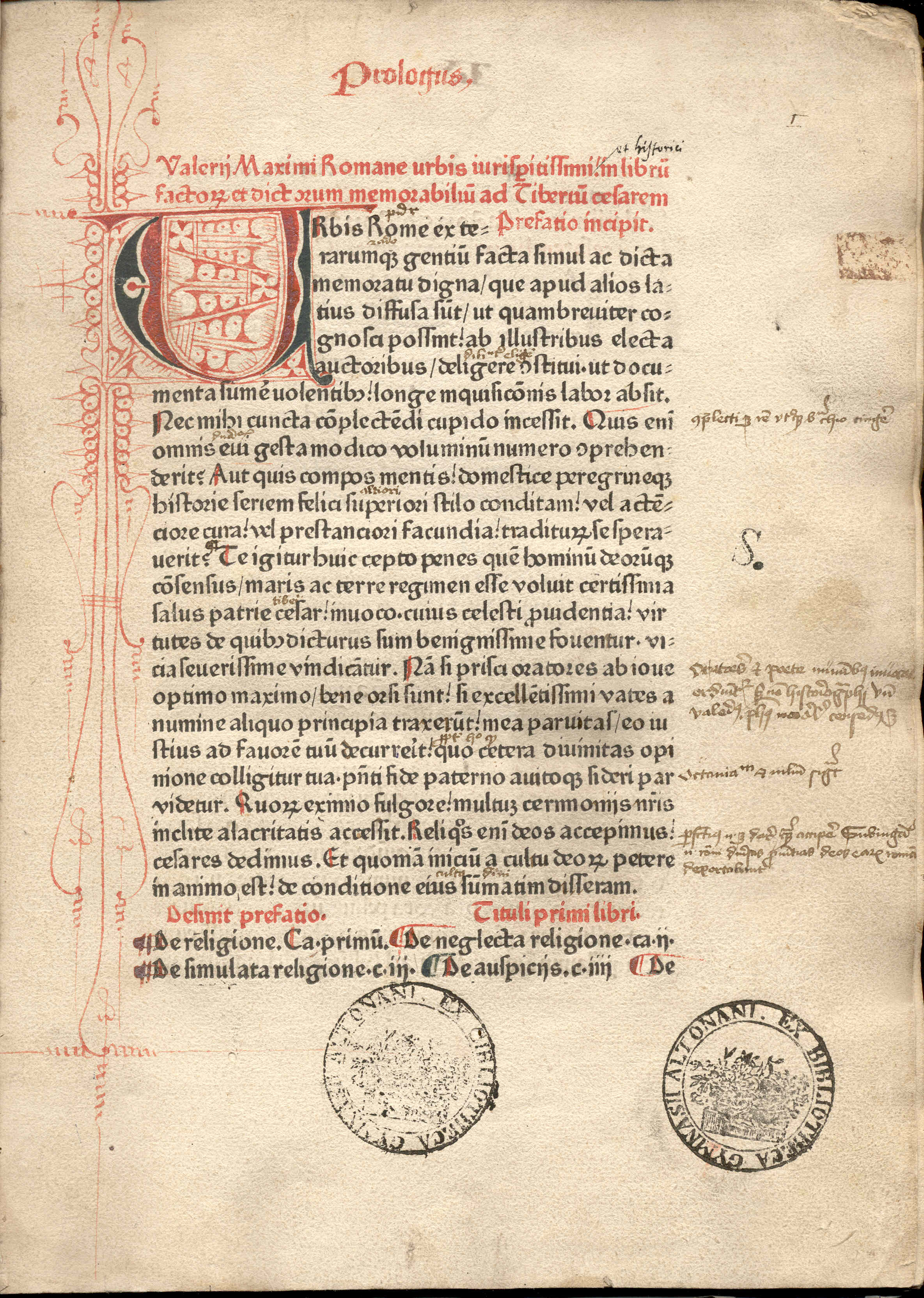
Page from an incunable of Valerius Maximus, Facta et dicta memorabilia, printed in red and black by Peter Schöffer (Mainz, 1471)

Valerius Maximus (/vəˈlɪəriəs ˈmæksɪməs/) was a 1st-century Latin writer and author of a collection of historical anecdotes: Factorum et dictorum memorabilium libri IX ("Nine books of memorable deeds and sayings", also known as De factis dictisque memorabilibus or Facta et dicta memorabilia). He worked during the reign of Tiberius (14 AD to 37 AD).

During the Middle Ages, Valerius Maximus was one of the most copied Latin prose authors, second only to Priscian. More than 600 medieval manuscripts of his books have survived as a result.

== Biography ==
Nothing is known of his life except that his family was poor and undistinguished, and that he owed everything to Sextus Pompeius (consul AD 14), proconsul of Asia, whom he accompanied to the East in 27. Pompeius was the center of a literary circle to which Ovid belonged; he was also an intimate friend of the most literary prince of the imperial family, Germanicus. Although he shared the same name as a prestigious family of the Republic, John Briscoe says "it is unlikely in the extreme" that Valerius Maximus belonged to the patrician Valerii Maximi. He suggests instead that he was either a descendant of the plebeian Valerii Tappones or Triarii, or earned the Roman citizenship thanks to the patronage of a Valerius of the Republic.

His attitude towards the imperial household is controversial: he has been represented as a mean flatterer of Tiberius, of the same type as Martial. Chisholm in 1911 argued however that, if the references to the imperial administration are carefully scanned, they will be seen to be extravagant neither in kind nor in number: few will now grudge Tiberius, when his whole action as a ruler is taken into account, such a title as salutaris princeps, which seemed to a former generation a specimen of shameless adulation. A quarter of a century later still, however, H J Rose claimed that Valerius "cares nothing for historical truth if by neglecting it he can flatter Tiberius, which he does most fulsomely".

Chisholm also maintained that the few allusions to Caesar's murderers and to Augustus hardly pass beyond the conventional style of the writer's day; and that the only passage which can fairly be called fulsome is the violently rhetorical tirade against Sejanus.

== Work ==
The style of Valerius's writing seems to indicate that he was a professional rhetorician; and his writing represents the rhetorical tendencies of the Silver Latin age. Direct and simple statement is avoided and novelty pursued at any price, producing a clumsy obscurity. The diction is like that of poetry; the uses of words are strained; metaphors are invented; there are startling contrasts, innuendoes and epithets; variations are played upon grammatical and rhetorical figures of speech.

In his preface, Valerius intimates that his work is intended as a commonplace book of historical anecdotes for use in the schools of rhetoric, where the pupils were trained in the art of embellishing speeches by references to history. According to the manuscripts, its title is Factorum ac dictorum memorabilium libri IX (shorter title Facta et dicta memorabilia), "Nine Books of Memorable Deeds and Sayings." The stories are loosely and irregularly arranged, each book being divided into sections, and each section bearing as its title the topic, most commonly some virtue or vice, or some merit or demerit, which the stories in the section are intended to illustrate.

Most of the tales are from Roman history, but each section has an appendix consisting of extracts from the annals of other peoples, principally the Greeks. The exposition exhibits strongly the two currents of feeling which are intermingled by almost every Roman writer of the Empire—the feeling that the Romans of the writer's own day are degenerate creatures when confronted with their own republican predecessors, and the feeling that, however degenerate, the latter-day Romans still tower above the other peoples of the world, and in particular are morally superior to the Greeks.

The author's chief sources are Cicero, Livy, Sallust and Pompeius Trogus, especially the first two. Valerius's treatment of his material is careless and inaccurate in the extreme; but in spite of his confusions, contradictions and anachronisms, the excerpts are apt illustrations, from the rhetorician's point of view, of the circumstance or quality they were intended to illustrate. Valerius has also used sources that are now lost, preserving some glimpses into the much debated and very imperfectly recorded reign of Tiberius; as well as some fragmentary information on Hellenistic art; and a revealing glimpse into the early imperial consensus on the need for the orderly logic and stability of the ancient Roman religion, in a politically unsettled world.

== Legacy ==
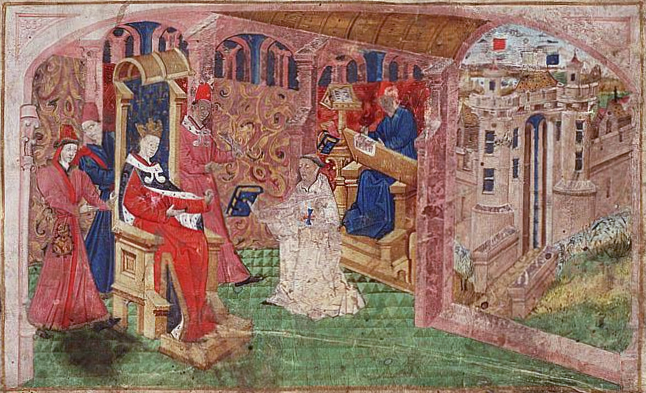
Simon de Hesdin presents his translation of Valerius Maximus' 'Facta et dicta memorabilia' to Charles V, King of France

The collection of Valerius was much used for school purposes, and its popularity throughout the Middle Ages is attested by the large number of manuscripts in which it has been preserved: indeed, B. G. Niebuhr went so far as to claim that it was then "the most important book next to the Bible". Like other schoolbooks it was epitomised: one complete epitome, probably of the 4th or 5th century, bearing the name of Julius Paris, has come down to us; also a portion of another by Januarius Nepotianus. Only in the Renaissance, however, did it enter the central Latin curriculum in unabridged form, and it is then that its influence was arguably at its peak. Dante for example used Valerius for details in his account of the generosity and modesty of Pisistratus.

Although in the manuscripts of Valerius a tenth book is given, which consists of the so-called Liber de Praenominibus, this is the work of some grammarian of a much later date.

== Editions and translations ==
A translation into Dutch was published in 1614, and was read by Rembrandt and other artists (and their patrons), stimulating interest in some of the subjects included therein (such as Artemisia's drinking of her husband's ashes).

Editions by C. Halm (1865) and C. Kempf (1888) contain the epitomes of Paris and Nepotianus. A new edition of the Latin text has been produced by J. Briscoe (1998); modern translations have been completed by R. Combès (1995 and 1997), in French, and D. R. Shackleton Baily (2000) and H. J. Walker (2004), in English.

Recent discussions of Valerius' work include W. Martin Bloomer, Valerius Maximus and the Rhetoric of the New Nobility (Chapel Hill, 1992); Clive Skidmore, Practical Ethics for Roman Gentlemen: the Work of Valerius Maximus (Exeter, 1996); and Hans-Friedrich Mueller, Roman Religion in Valerius Maximus (London, 2002).

600 manuscripts of Valerius have survived, 800 when counting epitomes—more than any other Latin prose writer after the grammarian Priscian. Most manuscripts date from the late Middle Ages, but 30 predate the 12th century. The three oldest manuscripts are the authoritative sources for the text:

- Burgerbibliothek, Bern, Switzerland, n°366 (manuscript A).
- Laurentian Library, Florence, Italy, Ashburnham 1899 (manuscript L). Both A and L were written in northern France in the 9th century and share a common source.
- Royal Library, Brussels, Belgium, n°5336 (manuscript G). It was probably written at Gembloux Abbey (south of Brussels) in the 11th century. Briscoe says that G has a different parent from A and L, as several mistakes shared by A and L are not found in G.
