= Tristia =

Elegiac poetry collection by Ovid

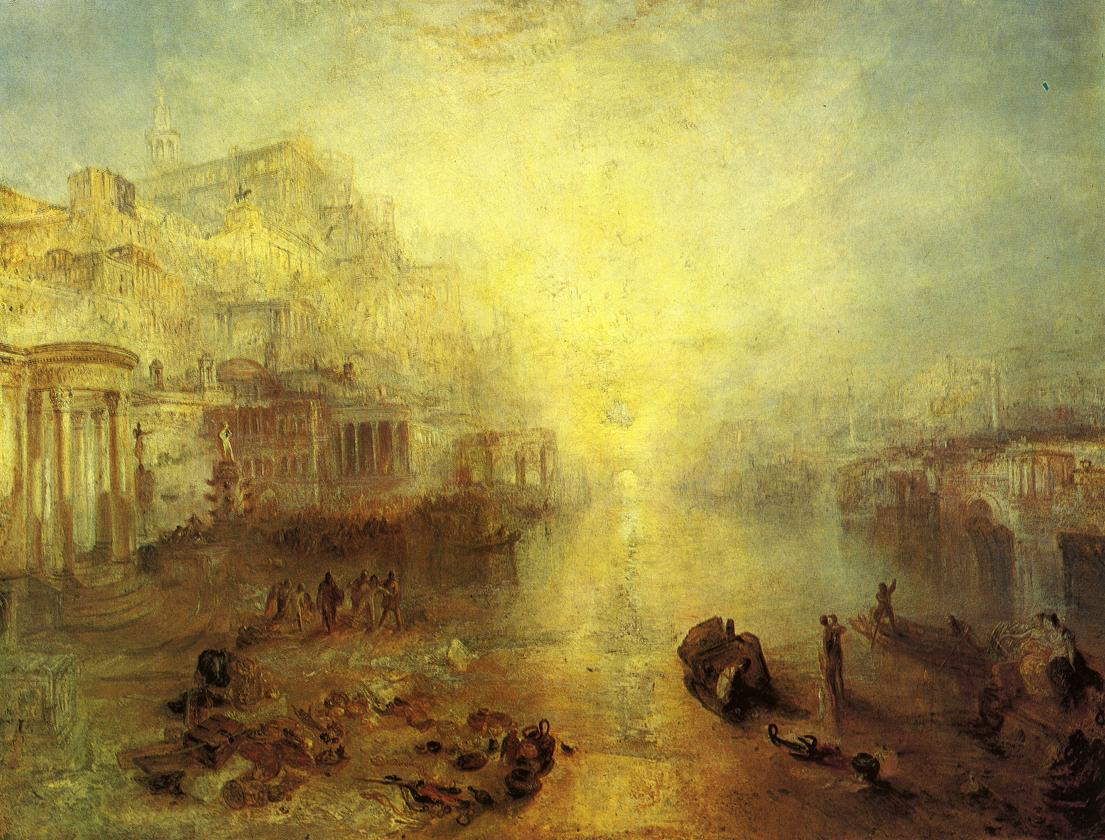
Ovid Banished from Rome (1838) by J. M. W. Turner

The Tristia ("Sad things" or "Sorrows") is a collection of poems written in elegiac couplets by the Augustan poet Ovid during the first three years following his banishment from Rome to Tomis on the Black Sea in AD 8. Despite five books in which he bewails his fate copiously, the immediate cause of Augustus' banishment of the most acclaimed living Latin poet to Pontus remains a mystery. In addition to the Tristia, Ovid wrote another collection of elegiac epistles on his exile, the Epistulae ex Ponto, as well as a 642-line curse poem called Ibis, directed against the unnamed enemy who had apparently caused his downfall. He spent several years in the outpost of Tomis and died in AD 17 or 18 without ever returning to Rome.

The Tristia was once viewed unfavorably in Ovid's œuvre, but has become the subject of scholarly interest in recent years.

== The poems ==
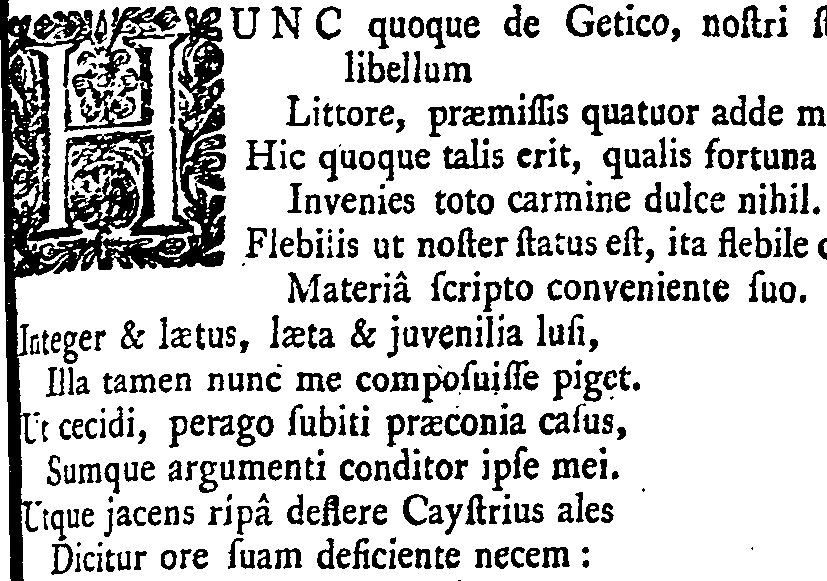
Opening of Book V of the Tristia, from a 1740 edition: Add this book also to the four I have already sent, my devoted friend, from the Getic shore. This too will be like the poet's fortunes: in the whole course of the song you will find no gladness. Mournful is my state, mournful therefore is my song, for the work is suited to its theme. Unhurt and happy with themes of happiness and youth I played (yet now I regret that I composed that verse); since I have fallen I act as herald of my sudden fall, and I myself provide the theme of which I write. As the bird of Cayster is said to lie upon the bank and bemoan its own death with weakening note…

The first of the five books was written during Ovid's journey into exile. It addresses his grieving wife, his friends — both the faithful and the false — and his past works, especially the Metamorphoses. Ovid describes his arduous travel to the furthest edge of the empire, giving him a chance to draw parallels with the exiles of Aeneas and Odysseus (Ulysses) and excuse his work's failings. The introductory poem, which cautions the departing book against the dangers of its destination, was probably written last.

The second book consists of a single 578-line poem. It takes the form of a plea to Augustus to end the unhappy exile brought about by his carmen et error (poem and error). The poem which had angered the Emperor was apparently Ovid's Ars Amatoria, a light-hearted instruction manual on how to pick up women; the nature of the "error" is never made clear, although some speculate it may have had something to do with Ovid's overhearing (or rather discovery) of the adulterous nature of Augustus' daughter, Julia. He defends his work and his life with equal vigor, appealing to the many poets who had written on the same themes as he—among them Anacreon, Sappho, Catullus and even Homer.

The plea was unsuccessful; Ovid would live out the remainder of his years in exile among the Thracian Getae. The last three books of the Tristia grow grimmer as their author ages, heavy with the knowledge that he will never return to his home. At one point he even composes his epitaph:

I who lie here, sweet Ovid, poet of tender passions,
fell victim to my own sharp wit.
Passer-by, if you've ever been in love, don't grudge me
the traditional prayer: 'May Ovid's bones lie soft!'

The last poem of book 5 addresses Ovid's wife, praising her loyalty throughout his years of exile and wishing that she be remembered for as long as his books are read.

The number of poems in Tristia differs slightly in different editions. For example, in Hall's 1995 Teubner edition, poems 1.5, 1.9, 3.4, 4.4, 5.2 and 5.7 are each split into two separate poems, which in most manuscripts each appear to be a single poem. Taking this division into account, book 1 has 13 poems, book 3 has 15, book 4 has 11, book 5 has 16. Book 2, as noted above, is one single poem.

== Critical reception ==
Peter Green wrote in a translation of Ovid's exile poems that the Tristia "[has] not, on the whole, had a good press from posterity". Gordon Williams referred to the work as "mostly a pale reflection of the genius that he had been". However, Ralph J. Hexter wrote in 1995 that literary critics were then "beginning to give the exile elegies a fresh look". A number of scholars have since viewed the collection favorably. It is listed among Ovid's major works by author David Malouf and scholar Matthew Woodcock. In Matthew Bunson's Encyclopedia of the Roman Empire, it is called "a powerful plea for justice".
