= Epistulae ex Ponto =

Letter collection by Ovid

Epistulae ex Ponto (Letters from the Black Sea) is a work of Ovid, in four books. It is a collection of letters describing Ovid's exile in Tomis (modern-day Constanța) written in elegiac couplets and addressed to his wife and friends. The first three books were composed between AD 12 and 13, according to the general academic consensus: "none of these elegies contains references to events falling outside that time span". The fourth book is believed to have been published posthumously.

== The poems ==
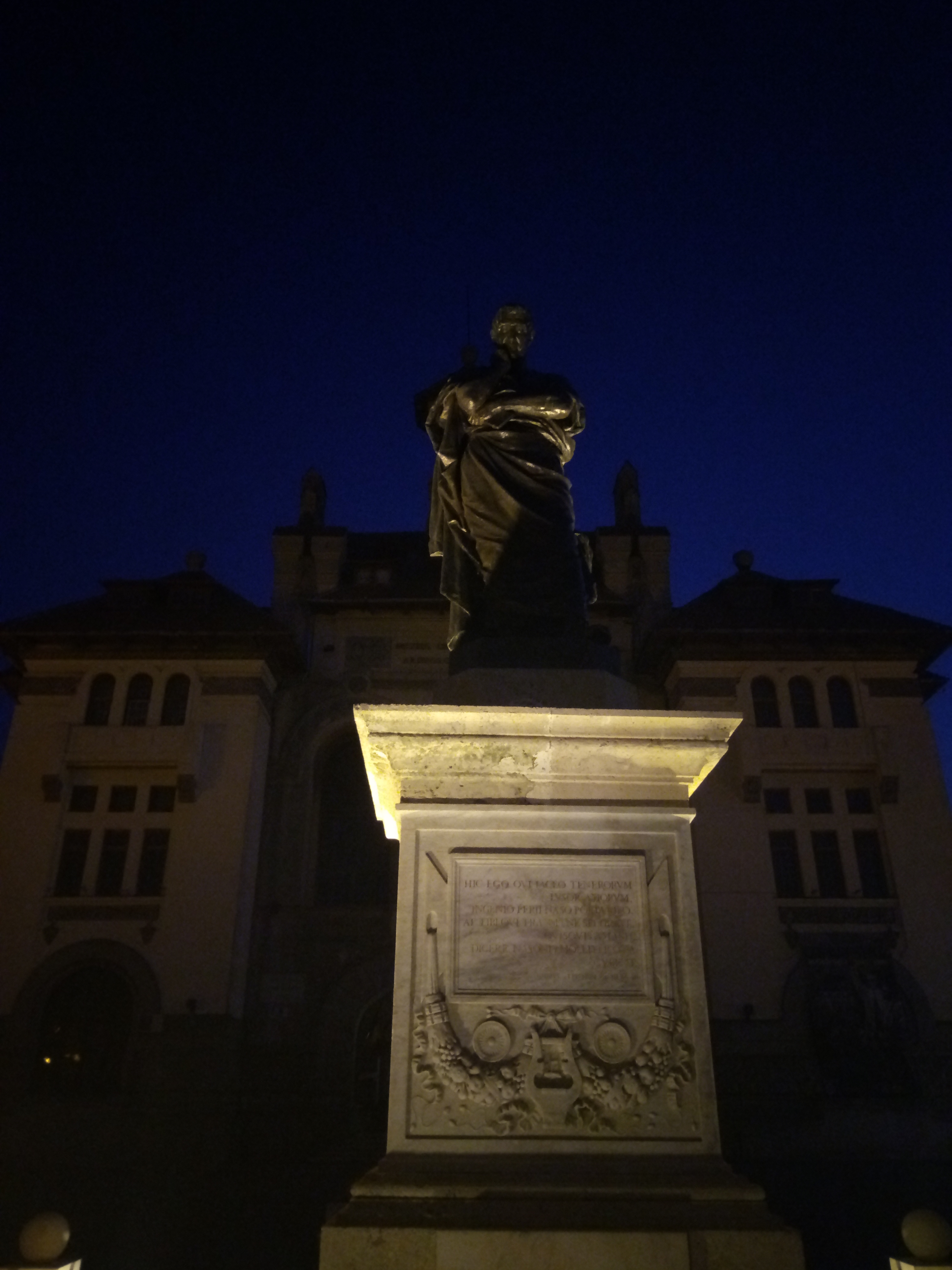
Statue of Ovid by Ettore Ferrari, Ovidiu Square, Constanța

The themes of the letters are similar to those of Tristia. Ovid writes to his wife and friends about the grimness of his exile, his deteriorating state of health and the future of his literary works. A recurring request to Ovid's named addressees in Epistulae ex Ponto remains his desire for a change of location from Tomis, which he repeatedly describes as "a town located in a war-stricken cultural wasteland on the remotest margins of empire". Recent scholarship has repeatedly identified discrepancies between Ovid's version and historical fact regarding Tomis.

While they explore similar themes, Epistulae ex Ponto differ from Tristia in epistolographic format, as they have named addressees. The individuals named include Paullus Fabius Maximus, Sextus Pompeius, and the brothers Marcus Valerius Messalla Messallinus and Marcus Aurelius Cotta Maximus Messalinus. Ovid's hopes rested largely on the genial character of Germanicus, nephew and adopted son of the emperor Tiberius, who is addressed or mentioned in several places.

Augustus and Livia feature heavily in the collection, as they do in Tristia, as absolute authorities over Ovid's hopes of his recalling to Rome or change of location for his relegation. Ovid hopes that the Empress Livia will be a potential ally to enable him to return home, describing her like a vestal virgin – pudicarum Vesta matrum, "Vesta of chaste matrons". However, Augustus' death and the death of his friend and frequent addressee, Paullus Fabius Maximus, discourage Ovid from hoping for a return. The collection ends on a sombre note, with a letter addressed to an unnamed enemy, accused of attempting to harm an already ruined Ovid.

== Structure ==
Epistulae ex Ponto is divided into four books, all consisting of letters sent to different addressees.

- Book I: letters to Brutus, Paullus Fabius Maximus, Rufinus, his wife, Cotta Maximus Messalinus, Publius Pomponius Graecinus, Messalinus, Severus, Maximus, Flaccus.
- Book II: letters to Germanicus, Messalinus, Cotta Maximus Messalinus, Atticus, Salanus, Publius Pomponius Graecinus, Cotys of Thrace, Macer, Rufus.
- Book III: letters to his wife, Cotta Maximus Messalinus, Paullus Fabius Maximus, Rufinus, an unknown friend, a group of unknown friends, Maximus, Brutus.
- Book IV: letters to Sextus Pompeius, Cornelius Severus, Brutus, Vestalis, Suillius, Graecinus, Albinovanus, Gallio, Carus, Tuticanus, an unnamed enemy.

== See also ==
- Exile of Ovid

== Bibliography ==
- Galfré, Edoardo (2023). Storia di un esule. L’evoluzione della poesia dell’esilio di Ovidio dai "Tristia" alle "Epistulae ex Ponto". Stuttgart: Steiner, ISBN 978-3-515-13371-5.
- Martin, Anna Julia (2004). Was ist Exil? Ovids 'Tristia' und 'Epistulae ex Ponto'. Hildesheim: Olms, ISBN 3-487-12803-9.
- Matthew M. McGowan (2009). Ovid in Exile: Power and Poetic Redress in the Tristia and Epistulae Ex Ponto. BRILL. ISBN 978-90-04-17076-6.
- Tola, Éléonora (2004). La métamorphose poétique chez Ovide. Tristes et Pontiques. Louvain: Peeters, ISBN 90-429-1407-6.
- Weiß, Adrian (2025). Naso Tomitanus. Intratextuelle Transformationen in Ovids Epistulae ex Ponto. Heidelberg: Winter, ISBN 978-3-8253-9628-2.
