= Ancient Italy – Ovid Banished from Rome =

Painting by J. M. W. Turner

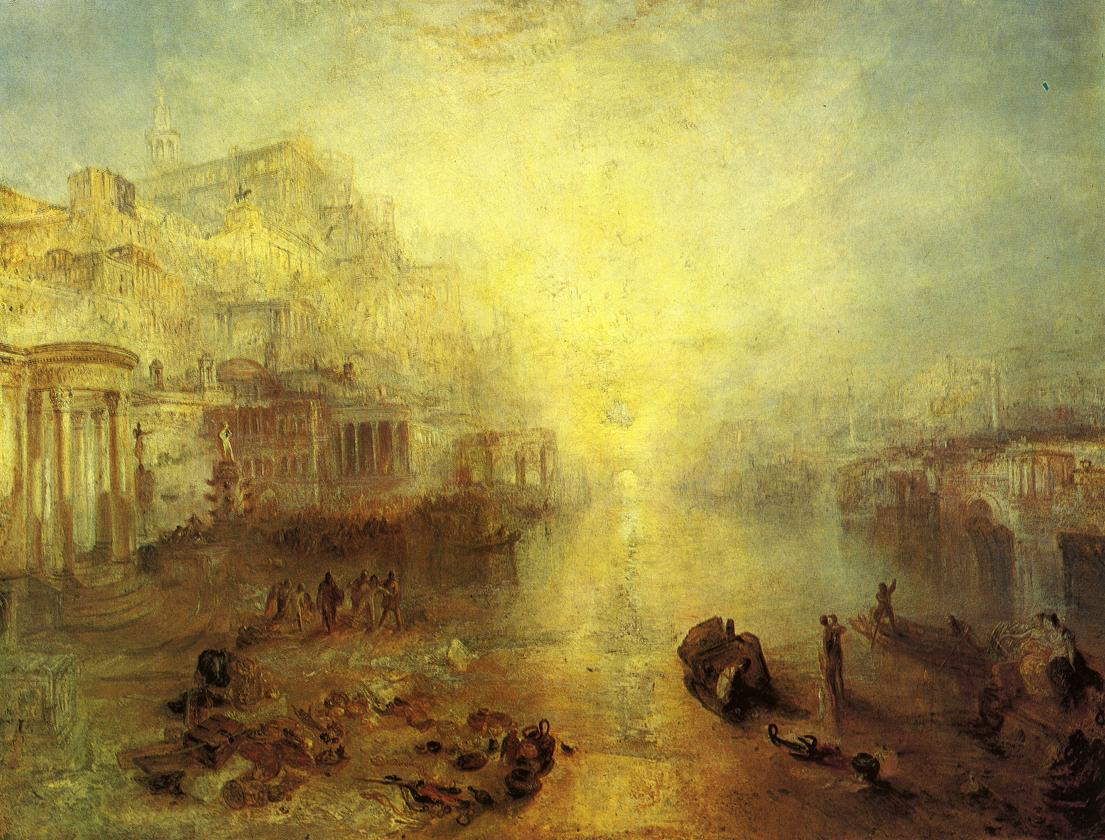
- Artist: J. M. W. Turner
- Year: 1838
- Type: Oil on canvas, history painting
- Dimensions: 94.6 cm × 125 cm (37.2 in × 49 in)
- Location: Private collection

Ancient Italy – Ovid Banished from Rome is an 1838 historical landscape painting by the British artist J.M.W. Turner. It depicts a scene from Ancient Rome when the celebrated poet Ovid was exiled by order of the Emperor Augustus in 8 AD. It is companion piece to Modern Italy – The Pifferari, which was displayed alongside it at the Royal Academy Exhibition of 1838 at the National Gallery in London.

The painting is now in a private collection. It was lent to appear at the 2025-26 exhibition Turner and Constable: Rivals and Originals held at Tate Britain.

== See also ==
- List of paintings by J. M. W. Turner

== Bibliography ==
- Bailey, Anthony. J.M.W. Turner: Standing in the Sun. Tate Enterprises, 2013.
- Concannon, Amy (ed.) Turner and Constable: Rivals and Originals.Tate Publishing, 2025
