= Remedia Amoris =

Poem in Latin by Roman poet Ovid

Remedia Amoris (also known as Love's Remedy or The Cure for Love; c. 2 AD) is an 814-line poem in Latin by Roman poet Ovid. In this companion poem to The Art of Love, Ovid offers advice and strategies to avoid being hurt by love feelings, or to fall out of love, with a stoic overtone.

== Genre ==
Remedia Amoris fell into the Hellenistic category of didactic poetry, often carried out on mock-solemn subjects.

== Goal and methods ==
Ovid's goal was to provide, for men and women alike, advice on how to escape safely from an unhappy love affair – emotional bondage – without falling into the tragic ends of such legendary figures as Dido or Medea.

Among the techniques he suggested were keeping busy; travelling; avoiding wine and love poetry; and concentrating on the beloved's defects rather than their strong points.

== Critical reactions ==
- Alexander Neckam in the Middle Ages thought that De Remedio Amoris was the most important book of Ovid's for scholars to read.
- Victorian views, seen for example in the work of Oskar Seyffert, generally adjudged The Cure for Love to be "as frivolous as it is original and elaborate...and no less offensive in substance and tone".
- The 20th century generally took a more positive view, H. J. Rose calling Ovid's instructions both frank and ingenious; while from a different discipline Eric Berne commended their continuing (metropolitan) practicality.

== See also ==
- The Anatomy of Melancholy
- Aratus
- Marcel Proust
- Self-help book
