= Nina MacLaughlin =

American writer

Nina MacLaughlin is an American writer. Her memoir Hammer Head: The Making of a Carpenter, discusses her decision to restart her career. MacLaughlin's work has also been published in Boston Magazine, LA Review of Books, Cosmopolitan, The Huffington Post, The Daily Beast and The Boston Globe. She was also recognized in Refiner29's list of "21 New Authors You Need to Know." MacLaughlin won the 2024 Massachusetts Center of the Book award for her nonfiction book Winter Solstice.

== Books ==
- Hammer Head: The Making of a Carpenter, W. W. Norton & Company, 2015
- Wake, Siren: Ovid Resung, Farrar, Straus and Giroux, 2019
- Summer Solstice: An Essay, Black Sparrow Press, 2020
- Winter Solstice: An Essay, Black Sparrow Press, 2023
- Burning in the Eyes of the Maker, Paintings by Celeste Dupuy-Spencer and text by Nina MacLaughlin, Monacelli, 2026

== Interviews ==
- NPR
- New York Magazine
- The Millions
