= Ars Amatoria =

Elegy series by Ovid (2 AD)

The Art of Love
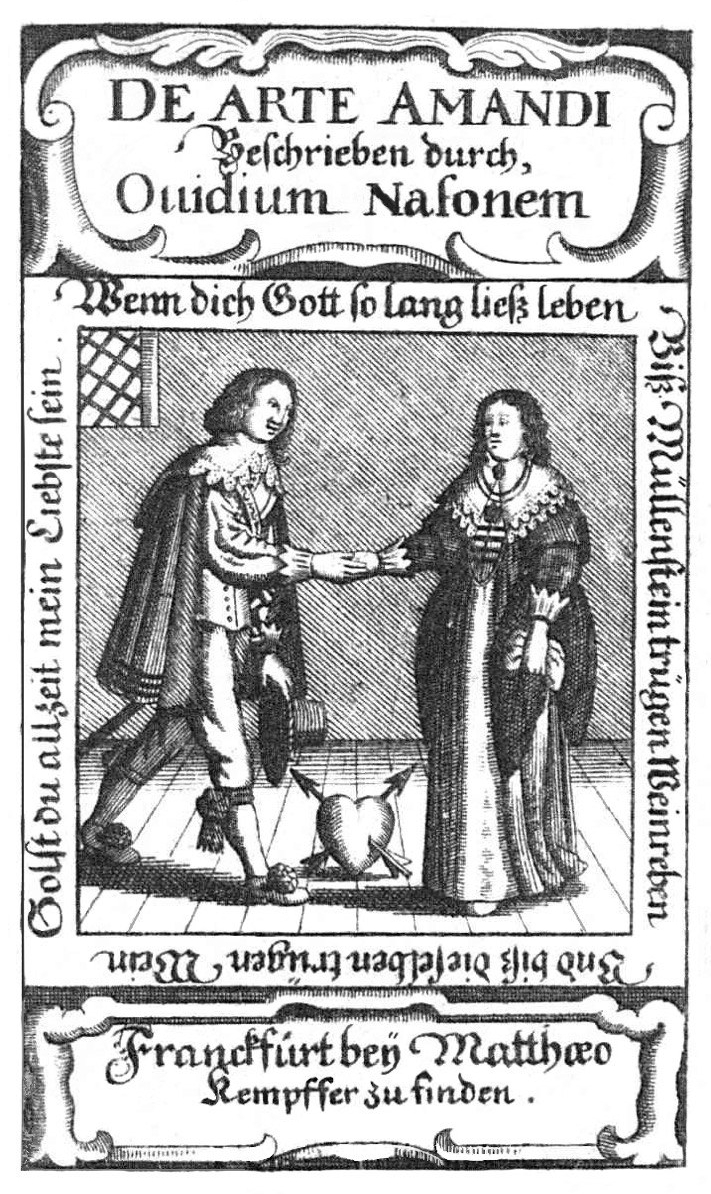
- Title page of a 1644 edition of Ars amatoria, published in Frankfurt.
- Author: Ovid
- Original title: Ars amatoria
- Language: Latin
- Publication date: c. 2 AD
- Publication place: Roman Empire

The Ars amatoria (The Art of Love) is an instructional elegy series in three books by the ancient Roman poet Ovid. It was written in 2 AD.

== Content ==
Book one of Ars amatoria was written to show a man how to find a woman. In book two, Ovid shows how to keep her. These two books contain sections which cover such topics as "not forgetting her birthday", "letting her miss you - but not for long", and "not asking about her age". The third book, written two years after the first books were published, gives women advice on how to win and keep the love of a man ("I have just armed the Greeks against the Amazons; now, Penthesilea, it remains for me to arm thee against the Greeks..."). Sample themes of this book include: "making up, but in private", "being wary of false lovers", and "trying young and older lovers".

The standard situations of finding love are presented in an entertaining way. Ovid includes details from Greek mythology, everyday Roman life and general human experience. The Ars amatoria is composed in elegiac couplets, rather than the dactylic hexameters, which are more usually associated with the didactic poem.

== Reception ==
The work was such a popular success that the poet wrote a sequel, Remedia Amoris (Remedies for Love). At an early recitatio, however, S. Vivianus Rhesus, Roman governor of Thracia, is noted as having walked out in disgust.

== Legacy ==
The Ars amatoria created considerable interest at the time of its publication. On a lesser scale, Martial's epigrams take a similar context of advising readers on love. Modern literature has been influenced by the Ars amatoria, which has presented additional information on the relationship between Ovid's poem and more current writings.

Feminist historian Emily James Putnam wrote that Medieval Europe took seriously the mock-analytical framework of Ars amatoria as a cue for further academic exegesis:

The tendency of the Middle Age toward the neat, the systematic, and the encyclopaedic, which made it so easy a prey to Aristotle, had the oddest results when directed toward the passion of love. Ovid's jeu d'esprit, the Ars Amatoria, was playfully set in a framework of Alexandrian didacticism. It was mildly amusing in his day to assume that rules could be laid down, by the use of which any one could become 'a master of the art of love,' to use the phrase of Diotima in Plato's Symposium. This work was well known to clerks in its Latin form, and when love became a matter of general theoretical interest, it was rendered into French and became the textbook of the subject. Thanks to its method, love became a department of scholasticism, a matter of definition and rule.

The Ars amatoria was included in the syllabuses of mediaeval schools from the second half of the 11th century, and its influence on 12th and 13th centuries' European literature was so great that the German mediaevalist and palaeographer Ludwig Traube dubbed the entire age 'aetas Ovidiana' ('the Ovidian epoch').

As in the years immediately following its publication, the Ars amatoria has historically been victim of moral outcry. All of Ovid's works were burned by Girolamo Savonarola in Florence, Italy in 1497; an English translation of the Ars amatoria was seized by U.S. Customs in 1930. Despite the actions against the work, it continues to be studied in college courses on Latin literature.

== See also ==
- Roman de la Rose
