= List of Metamorphoses characters =

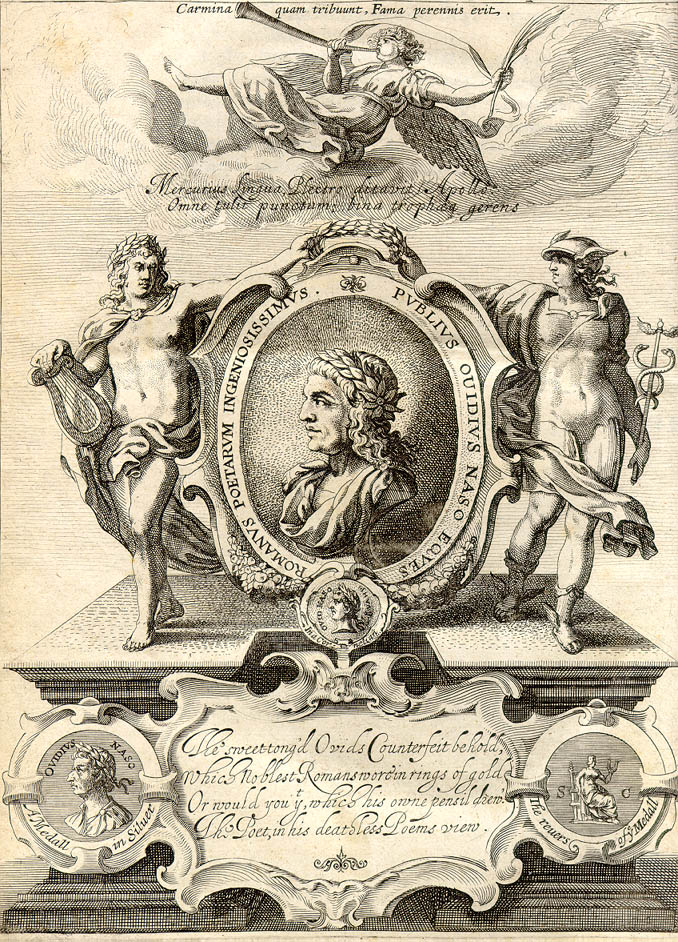
Cover of George Sandys's 1632 edition of Ovid's Metamorphosis Englished

This is a list of characters in the poem Metamorphoses by Ovid. It contains more than 200 characters, summaries of their roles, and information on where they appear. The descriptions vary in length and comprehensiveness, upgrading characters who were actually metamorphosed, who play a significant role, or about whom a certain background knowledge is required to understand the Metamorphoses. The major Roman gods in general play significant roles in all of the stories, but only their attributes are listed under their own name—their specific roles are summarized under the individual involved characters' names (e.g. Apollo's role in the myth of Hyacinthus is listed under Hyacinthus).

== Characters ==
Name	Role	Appearance(s) in Metamorphoses (Book: verses)	Ref(s)
Abaris	One of Phineus' men at Perseus' wedding.	V: 137	
Achelous	Father of the Sirens and patron deity of the Achelous River.	V: 552, VIII: 549–727, IX: 3-413	
Achilles	Son of Peleus and the nymph Thetis. Achilles was foreseen an early death if he joined the Greeks in the Trojan War so his mother disguised him as a girl to protect him. Ulysses, however, discovered him and convinced him to join the battle.	VIII: 309, XI: 265, XII: 73-615, XIII: 30-597, XV: 856	
Acis	Son of Faunus and a river nymph. The lover of Galatea (deity).	XIII: 750-896	
Acmon	One of the Greek hero Diomedes' men from Pleuron, Aetolia. Metamorphosed into a bird.	XIV: 484-505	
Acoetes	Bacchus' alias towards Pentheus. Acoetes was a Tyrrhenian man from Lydia.	III: 582-696	
Actaeon	Grandson of Cadmus. He accidentally saw Diana naked and was metamorphosed into a stag as a punishment.	III: 146-721	
Adonis	Son of King Cinyras of Cyprus and his daughter Myrrha. Beloved by the goddesses Venus and Proserpina. He was to spend one third of the year with each of them – the last part was at his own disposal, which he used together with Venus. Adonis died during a boar hunt and Venus' grief showed itself as the delicate flower anemone.	X: 529-730	
Aeacus	Son of Jupiter and the nymph Aegina, father of Telamon, Peleus, and Phocus, and king of Aegina. Aeacus became one of the judges in the Underworld after his death.	VII: 472–668, VIII: 4, IX: 435–440, XI: 227–250, XIII: 25-33	
Aeëtes	Son of Sol, father of Medea, and king of Colchis.	VII: 9-170	
Aegeus	Son of Pandion, husband of Medea, father of Theseus, and king of Athens. Aegeus almost killed Theseus at Medea's urging.	VII: 402–502, IX: 448, XI: 663, XII: 342, XV: 856	
Aeneas	Son of Venus and Anchises (of the Dardanian dynasty). Aeneas was one of the few Trojan survivors after the Trojan War who was not enslaved. He fled with his father, Anchises, on his back. Escaping to Italy with the help of his mother his group, the Aeneids, became the progenitors of the Romans. Upon his death he was deified as Jupiter Indiges by request of his mother.	XIII: 624–681, XIV: 78-603, XV: 437-861	
Aesacus	Son of King Priam. Mourning the death of his lover he was metamorphosed into a bird.	XI: 763, XII: 1	
Aesculapius	God of medicine and healing. Son of Apollo and Coronis.	II: 629-654	
Aeson	Father of Jason and king of Iolcus, Thessaly. He was usurped the throne from his brother Pelias.	VII: 60-303	
Agamemnon	Son of Atreus and king of Mycene. He led the Greeks in the Trojan War.	XII: 626, XIII: 216–655, XV: 855	
Aglaulus	One of the three daughters of Cecrops.	II: 559-819	
Ajax the Great	Grandson of Aeacus and son of Telamon. Greek hero in the Trojan War.	XII: 624, XIII: 2-390	
Ajax the Lesser	Son of Oïleus and Greek hero in the Trojan War. Among other things known for his raping the Trojan prophetess and princess Cassandra at the temple of Apollo.	XII: 622, XIII: 356, XIV: 468	
Alcmene	Queen of Tiryns, wife of Amphitryon, and mother of Hercules by Jupiter.	VI: 112, IX: 23-394	
Alcyone	Daughter of Aelous and wife of Ceyx.	XI: 384-746	
Althaea	Daughter of Thestius, wife of Oeneus, and mother of Meleager.	VIII: 446-531	
Anaxarete	Cyprian maid who refused her suitor Iphis. Unmoved, even as he committed suicide, Venus turned her to stone.	XIV: 698-748	
Andromeda	Daughter of Cepheus and Cassiopeia. She was chained to a rock as a sacrifice for her mother's bragging, but was saved by Perseus, whom she later married.	IV: 670–739, V: 152	
Anius	Priest of Apollo and king of Delos.	XIII: 632-679	
Apollo	God of poetry, music, healing, and divination. Son of Jupiter and Latona and a great archer.	I: 455, II: 543–677, III: 8–421, V: 328, VI: 250–383, VII: 324–389, VIII: 15–31, IX: 332–663, X: 132–209, XI: 58-412, XIII: 174–715, XIV: 133, XV: 630-865	
Aquilo	The Northern wind. Roman equivalent of the Greek Boreas.	I: 64, VI: 682–702, VII: 695, XII: 24, XIII: 418, XV: 471	
Arachne	Daughter of Idmon. Boasted she could weave better than Minerva and won over her in a weaving contest. Jealous, the goddess metamorphosed Arachne into a spider.	VI: 5-148	
Arcas	Son of Jupiter and the nymph Callisto. Jealous of Callisto, Juno metamorphosed her into a bear, which Arcas killed, not knowing it was his mother. Jupiter took pity on the two and metamorphosed them into the constellations known as Ursa Major and Ursa Minor (the big bear and the little bear).	II: 469-496	
Arethusa	Nymph and spring. She fled from the river god Alpheus to Syracusa, Sicily.	V: 409-642	
Argus	Monster with a hundred eyes and the protector of Io.	I: 625–720, II: 533	
Atalanta (huntress)	Arcadian huntress.	VIII: 317-426	
Atalanta (princess)	Daughter of the Boeotian King Schoeneus.	X: 560-669	
Athamas	Son of Aeolus and husband of Ino (daughter of Cadmus).	III: 564, IV: 420–517, XIII: 919	
Athis	Indian demigod, one of Phineus' warriors at Perseus' wedding.	V: 47-62	
Atlas	Titan, son of Iapetus. He was metamorphosed into the North-West-African Atlas Mountains after he supported the Titans against the Olympian gods during the Titanomachy. He holds Uranus (the sky) on his shoulders.	I: 682, II: 296–742, IV: 628–772, VI: 174, IX: 273, XV: 149	
Aurora	Goddess of dawn and wife of Tithonus. Aurora is the Roman equivalent of the Greek Eos.	II: 112–144, III: 149–600, IV: 629, V: 440, VI: 47, VII: 100–835, IX: 421, XIII: 576–621, XIV: 228, XV: 665	
Autolycus	Son of Mercury and Chione and grandfather of Ulysses through his daughter, Anticlea.	VIII: 738, XI: 313	
Bacchus	God of wine, both its intoxicating effects as well as its social and beneficent influences. Son of Jupiter and Semele. He is viewed as the promoter of peace, a lawgiver, and a lover of peace. Roman equivalent of the Greek Dionysus.	III: 316–733, IV: 3–613, V: 329, VI: 125–598, VII: 294–359, XI: 85–134, XII: 578, XIII: 639–651, XV: 114–413	
Battus	Old man from Pylos.	II: 688	
Baucis	Wife of Philemon. Metamorphosed into a linden tree by Zeus	VIII: 631-714	
Boreas	The Northern wind. Greek name of the Roman Aquilo.	I: 64, VI: 682–702, VII: 695, XII: 24, XIII: 418, XV: 471	
Byblis	Daughter of Miletus. Byblis fell incestuously in love with Caunus, but as she could not get him she tried to kill herself, but was metamorphosed into a nymph.	IX: 447–654	
Cadmus	Son of Agenor (who was king of Tyre, Phoenicia), brother of Europa, husband of Venus' daughter Harmonia, and the founder of Thebes. Cadmus was sent out to find and return his sister, Europa, to Phoenicia after she had been abducted by Jupiter.	III: 3–64, IV: 472–595, VI: 177	
Caeneus/Caenis	Born the daughter – Caenis – of the Lapith Elatus. She was metamorphosed into an invulnerable, male hero – Caeneus – by Neptunus.	VIII: 305, XII: 172-514	
Calchas	Son of Thestor. Calchas was the Argive augur of the Greeks in the Trojan War.	XII: 19-27	
Calliope	Muse and mother of Orpheus.	V: 338, X: 148	
Callisto	Nymph and daughter of Lycaon. One of the followers of Diana. Raped by Jupiter, transformed into a bear and killed by her son who was unaware of her new form.	II: 443-508	
Canens	Nymph, daughter of Janus and Venilia, and wife of King Picus. Her husband was metamorphosed into a woodpecker by Circe, because he scorned her love, and when Canens could not find her metamorphosed husband she killed herself.	XIV: 338-434	
Cassandra	Daughter of King Priam of Troy. She was a priestess of Apollo, gifted with the ability to predict the future but cursed so nobody would ever believe her prophecies. Cassandra was raped by Ajax the Lesser and taken as a concubine for Agamemnon at the fall of Troy, but they were later both killed by Agamemnons wife, Clytemnestra.	XIII: 410, XIV: 468	
Caunus	Son of Miletus and brother of Byblis. Byblis fell incestuously in love with Caunus, but as she could not get him she tried to kill herself, but was metamorphosed into a nymph.	IX: 453-633	
Cecrops	The mythical founder Athens. He is often depicted with his lower body as a snake.	II: 555–784, VI: 70, VII: 485, VIII: 550, XV: 427	
Cephalus	Grandson of Aeolus and husband of Procris. Cephalus was an Athenian noble who accidentally killed his wife.	VI: 681, VII: 493–865, VIII: 4	
Ceres	Goddess of agriculture, grain crops, fertility and motherly relationships. Roman equivalent of the Greek Demeter.	I: 123, V: 110–660, VI: 118, VII: 439, VIII: 274–814, IX: 422, X: 74-431, XI: 112–122, XIII: 639, XV: 122	
Ceyx	Husband of Alcyone and king of Thrace. He died in a shipwreck.	XI: 271-740	
Chariclo	The mother of Ocyrhoë by Chiron.	II: 636	
Charybdis	Daughter of Neptunus and Gaia. Charybdis was once a naiad, but was metamorphosed into a monster at the Sicilian coast by the Strait of Messina, opposite of the sea monster Scylla. Charybdis was a maelstrom which sucked any ship passing too close by into the deeps.	VII: 63, VIII: 121, XIII: 730, XIV: 75	
Chione	Daughter of Daedalion.	XI: 301	
Chiron	Centaur, son of Philyra and Saturnus and father of Ocyrhoë. Chiron was known for his wisdom and raised many heroes and godsons. Chiron was immortal since he was son of the Titan Saturnus, but after being hit by one of Hercules' arrows by accident he was poisoned by the Lernaean Hydra's blood. He then asked for death and was given it. When he died he was metamorphosed into the constellation known as Centaurus.	II: 630–676, VI: 126	
Cinyras	Son of Pygmalion's daughter Paphos, husband of Cenchreis, father of Myrrha and Adonis, and king of Cyprus. He was deceived and seduced by Myrrha from which the result was Adonis.	X: 298-472	
Cipus	Roman legendary commander.	XV: 565-621	
Circe	Daughter of Sol and Perse. Circe was a goddess skilled in magic.	IV: 205, XIII: 968, XIV: 9–446, XV: 717	
Clymene	Daughter of Tethys, the wife the Ethiopian King Merops, and the mother of Phaethon and the Heliades by Sol.	I: 756–766, II: 19-334, IV: 204	
Corone	Daughter of Coroneus of Phocis. She was attacked by Neptunus, but was delivered from him by Minerva, who metamorphosed her into a crow.	II: 547-595	
Cupid	God of desire and erotic love, son of Mars and Venus. Roman equivalent of the Greek Eros.	I: 455–463, IV: 321, V: 374–379, VII: 73, IX: 482-543	
Cyane	Nymph and spring in Syracuse, Sicily.	V: 409-470	
Cyáneë (or Cyanee)	Nymph, daughter of Maeander and mother of Caunus and Byblis by Miletus.	IX: 452	
Cybele	Phrygian goddess, the Mother of the gods. She is depicted with a turreted crown.	X: 696–704, XIV: 535-546	
Cygnus (1)	Son of Sthenelous and friend and relative of Phaethon.	II: 367, XII: 581	
Cygnus (2)	Son of Apollo and the nymph Hyrie. A spoiled youth he had been given tamed animals by Phylius, but when he was denied a bull he tried to kill himself, and was metamorphosed into a swan.	VII: 371	
Cygnus (3)	Son of Neptunus. He was a Trojan hero, invulnerable because he was the son of Neptunus, but still mortal.	XII: 71-169	
Cyllarus	Centaur, husband of Hylonome. He dearly loved his centaur wife, but participating in the battle against the Lapiths he was fatally wounded by a spear. He died in the arms of Hylonome, who took her own life shortly afterwards to join him.	XII: 393-420	
Cyparissus	Loved by Apollo, he was given a tame deer by the god, which he accidentally killed with a javelin.	X: 120-130	
Daedalion	Brother of Ceyx.	XI: 295-340	
Daedalus	Architect, inventor, and the father of Icarus. He constructed wings made of feathers and wax for him and his son to escape from Crete.	VIII: 159–260, IX: 742	
Daphne	Nymph, daughter of Peneus. She was metamorphosed into a laurel to escape the amorous god Apollo. As a sign of his love for her, Apollo wears the laurel around his head.	I: 452-547	
Deïanira	Daughter of Oeneus, sister of Meleager, wife of Hercules. Famous for unwittingly killing Hercules with the Shirt of Nessus.	VIII: 542, IX: 8-137	
Deucalion	Son of Prometheus.	I: 318–391, VI: 120, VII: 356	
Diana	Goddess of the hunt, associated with the Moon, daughter of Jupiter and Latona, and sister of Apollo. Roman equivalent of the Greek Artemis.	I: 476–694, II: 414–425, III: 156–251, IV: 304, V: 329–641, VII: 746–754, VIII: 272–579, IX: 90, X: 536, XI: 322, XII: 35-267, XIII: 185, XIV: 331, XV: 196-549	
Diomedes (Thracian king)	Son of Mars and Cyrene and king of Thrace. He was known for his man-eating horses. Diomedes was killed by Hercules.	IX: 195	
Diomedes (Greek hero)	Son of Tydeus and friend of Ulysses. Greek hero in the Trojan War where he wounded Venus when the goddess interfered in the battle.	XII: 622, XIII: 68-351, XIV: 457–512, XV: 769-806	
Dis	God of the underworld. Roman equivalent of Pluto.	II: 261, IV: 438–510, V: 356–569, VII: 249, XV: 534	
Dryope	Daughter of King Eurytus of Oechalia and half-sister of Iolë.	IX: 331-364	
Egeria	Nymph, wife of Numa, the second king of Rome.	XV: 547-550	
Echo	Nymph who could only repeat others, not talk for herself. She fell in love with Narcissus, but was rejected as everyone else. In her heartache she faded away until nothing was left, but her voice.	III: 358-507	
Erysichthon	Son of Triopas and king of Thessaly. He was punished with insatiable hunger for killing a nymph and sold everything he owned, including his daughter, Mestra. Nothing could satisfy his hunger and eventually he ate himself to death.	VIII: 739-823	
Europa	Daughter of the Phoenician King Agenor, sister of Cadmus, and the mother of Minos by Jupiter.	II: 844–868, III: 3–258, VI: 103, VIII: 23-120	
Eurydice	Nymph, wife of Orpheus. She was killed by a snakebite, prompting Orpheus to seek a way to bring her back to life, which he attempted but failed at.	X: 8-48, XI: 63-66	
Eurytus (1)	Father of Hippasus.	VIII: 371	
Eurytus (1)	Father of Iolë and Dryope and king of Oechalia, Euboea.	IX: 356-363	
Eurytus (2)	Centaur who tried to kidnap Hippodame at her and Theseus' wedding, but was killed by the latter in the attempt.	XII: 220-238	
Galanthis	One of Alcmene's maids.	IX:306-323	
Galatea (deity)	The nereid (sea-nymph) who fell in love with the spirit of the Acis River in Sicily, Acis.	XIII: 738-880	
Galatea (statue)	A statue carved out of ivory by Pygmalion. Pygmalion fell in love with Galatea and after Pygmalion had sacrificed to Venus (mythology) during her festival, Galatea was made into a real woman.	X: 247-297	
Ganymede	Son of the Dardanian King Tros and brother of Ilus (the founder of Ilion) and Assaracus (the grandfather of Aeneas).	X: 155–160, XI: 756	
Glaucus	Boeotic fisherman who was metamorphosed into a sea god.	VII: 233, XIII: 906–916, XIV: 11-68	
Hecuba	The wife and queen of King Priam of Troy.	XI: 761, XIII: 404-620	
Hercules	Demigod, son of Jupiter and the mortal Alcmene. Famous for his strength, solving the twelve labors set by King Eurystheus. He was killed unwittingly by his wife Deïanira using the Shirt of Nessus. Hercules is the Roman equivalent of the Greek Heracles.	VII: 364–410, VIII: 542, IX: 13-400, XI: 213–626, XII: 309–575, XIII: 51-401, XV: 8-284	
Hermaphroditus	Son of Venus and Mercury. He was born as a handsome boy, but was metamorphosed into an androgynous being when he was fused with the nymph Salmacis.	IV: 291-383	
Herse	One of the three daughters of Cecrops, her sisters being Aglaulus and Pandrosus.	II: 559-809	
Hersilia	Wife and queen of Romulus. Deified as Hora.	XIV: 831-847	
Hesperia	Aesacus' lover.	XI: 768	
Hippodame	Daughter of Adrastos and wife of Theseus.	XII: 210	
Hippolytus	Son of Theseus and the Amazon Queen Antiope and stepson of Phaedra. Phaedra tried to seduce Hippolytus, but as he rejected her she convinced Theseus that Hippolytus had raped her. This made Theseus use one of his three wishes to curse Hippolytus which eventually killed him. Hippolytus was deified as Virbius.	XV: 497-543	
Hippomenes	Son of Megareus and descendant of Neptunus through his grandfather, Onchestus. Raced and won over Atalante (the princess) with the help of Venus, thereby winning Atalante's hand. They were both metamorphosed into lions after having had intercourse in a temple.	X: 575-668	
Hyacinthus	A beautiful boy loved by Apollo. One day as Apollo was throwing a discus and Hyacinthus ran to catch it, he was struck by the discus and died. Apollo made the hyacinth in his memory.	X: 162–217, XIII: 396	
Hylonome	Female centaur. She was present at the battle against the Lapiths, where she lost her husband, the centaur Cyllarus. Heartbroken, she committed suicide to join him	XII: 405-423	
Ianthe	Cretan girl who was engaged to Iphis (Cretan girl).	IX: 715-797	
Icarus	Son of Daedalus. Daedalus constructed wings made of feathers and wax for him and his son to escape from Crete. Icarus flew too close to the Sun which made the wax melt and Icarus fell to his death in the sea.	VIII: 196-235	
Idmon	Father of Arachne.	VI: 8-133	
Ilia	Daughter of Numitor and descendant of Aeneas. She was by Mars the mother of the twins Romulus and Remus, the two founders of Rome. Her alternative name is Rhea Silvia.	XIV: 780-823	
Inachus	River deity in Argolis and father of Io.	I: 583–645, IX: 686	
Ino	Daughter of Cadmus and queen of Thebes. Deified as Leucothea.	III: 313–722, IV: 417-543	
Io	Nymph, daughter of Inachus. Io was raped by Jupiter and in jealousy Juno metamorphosed Io into a cow. Io wandered until she reached Egypt where she prayed that the punishment would end. Jupiter heard her and calmed Juno. Juno metamorphosed Io into a human form again, but in the process also deified her as the Egyptian goddess Isis.	I: 628–747, II: 524, IX: 686	
Iphigenia	Daughter of Agamemnon and Clytemnestra.	XII: 30–34, XIII: 185	
Iphis (Cretan)	Daughter of Telethusa and Ligdus. She was raised as a boy and fell in love with the girl Ianthe. Iphis prayed that the women could be married so the Egyptian goddess Isis metamorphosed Iphis into a man.	IX: 668-797	
Iphis (Cyprian)	Young man in Cyprus. When he was rejected by Anaxarete whom he loved, he committed suicide.	XIV: 698-753	
Iris	Goddess of the rainbow and daughter of Thaumas. She was the messenger of Juno.	I: 271, IV: 479, VI: 63, XI: 585–622, XIV: 85-838	
Isis	Egyptian goddess recognized by the Greeks and Romans. In the Metamorphoses she is identified with the re-metamorphosed Io.	I: 747, IX: 686-773	
Itys	Son of Procne and Tereus. Itys was fed to Tereus by his mother in revenge for Tereus' raping her sister, Philomela, and cutting out her tongue.	VI: 437-658	
Ixion	Father of Pirithous, and king of the Lapiths in Thessaly. He was invited to the banquet of the Olympian gods, but instead of being grateful he tried to rape his hostess, Juno. Juno transformed herself into a cloud from which the centaurs were born. Ixion was punished in Tartarus by being bound to an ever-spinning wheel of fire.	IV: 461–464, VIII: 403, IX: 123, X: 42, XII: 210-504	
Jason	Son of King Aeson of Iolcus, Thessaly. Jason was sent to Colchis to get the golden fleece by his uncle Pelias, who had usurped the throne from Aeson. For this expedition Jason collected a large number of heroes, the Argonauts, and let the ship Argo build.	VII: 5–397, VIII: 302-349	
Juno	Sister and wife of Jupiter. Roman equivalent of the Greek Hera.	I: 270–738, II: 435–531, III: 256–362, IV: 173–549, VI: 89-428, VIII: 220, IX: 15-796, X: 506, XI: 578–648, XII: 504, XIII: 574, XIV: 85-829, XV: 164-774	
Jupiter	King of the gods, and the god of sky and thunder. Roman equivalent of the Greek Zeus.	I: 106–749, II: 60-836, III: 6–363, IV: 3–799, V: 11-564, VI: 51-801, VII: 367–801, VIII: 50-703, IX: 24-499, X: 148–161, XI: 41-756, XII: 11-561, XIII: 5–857, XIV: 594–807, XV: 12-871	
Laomedon	Father of Priam and king of Troy.	VI: 96, XI: 196–757, XIII: 417	
Latona	Daughter of the Titan Coeus and by Jupiter mother of Apollo and Diana, whom she gave birth to in Delos. Latona is the Roman name of the Greek Leto.	VI: 159–346, VII: 384	
Latreus	Centaur who killed Halesus, but was shortly after killed by Caeneus.	XII: 462-493	
Lethaea	Wife of Olenus. She boasted that she was more beautiful than any god and was turned to stone. Her husband chose to share her fate though he could have avoided it.	X: 69	
Leucothea	Name of the deified form of Ino (she was metamorphosed into a sea goddess).	IV: 542	
Lichas	Deïanira's servant who brought Hercules the poisoned Shirt of Nessus.	V::: 272	
Lycaon	King of Arcadia.	I: 165–221, II: 495-526	
Macareus (1)	One of the Lapiths.	XII: 452	
Macareus (2)	Son of Neritus and one of Ulysses' men.	XIV: 158-441	
Mars	God of war. Roman equivalent of the Greek Ares.	III: 32–132, IV: 171, VI: 70, VII: 101, XII: 90, XIV: 806–818, XV: 863	
Medea	Daughter of King Aeetes of Colchis. She protected Jason from the tasks her father set him, and eventually married him. When he divorced her, she went insane, killed her old family, and married Aegeus.	VII: 10-424	
Medusa	The most famous of the three Gorgons, daughters of the sea god Phorcys. Medusa was a terrible monster that turned people to stone if they beheld her, but was killed by Perseus and from her blood sprang Pegasus, the winged horse.	IV: 616–801, V: 69-248, VI: 119	
Meleager	Foster son of King Oeneus of Calydon, son of Althaea by Mars, and husband of Cleopatra.	VIII: 270–515, IX: 149	
Memnon	Son of Aurora and Tithonus and king of Ethiopia, allied with Troy.	XIII: 278-600	
Mercury	Messenger of the gods, especially of Jupiter. Son of the Pleiade Maia and Jupiter. Roman equivalent of the Greek Hermes.	I: 669–713, II: 685–834, IV: 187–754, VIII: 627, XI: 303–307, XIII: 146	
Midas	King of Phrygia. Midas was granted the ability to turn everything he touched into gold by Bacchus, but when he saw that this ability made him unable to eat and drink he hated his new-gained power. Bacchus advised him to wash the magic off in the river Pactolus. Later Midas was called upon to decide whether Pan or Apollo played the most beautiful music, but doubting that Apollo was the best he was given donkey ears.	XI: 92-194	
Minerva	Virgin goddess of the war, art, wisdom, and science, daughter of Jupiter, and protector of Athens. Roman equivalent of the Greek Athena.	II: 709–835, IV: 33-799, V: 250–334, VI: 23–43, VIII: 252, XIII: 344, XIV: 475, XV: 709	
Minos	Son of Jupiter and Europa, king of Crete, husband of Pasiphaë, and father of Ariadne. After his death he became judge of the dead in the underworld.	VII: 456–504, VIII: 6–262, IX: 437-445	
Minotaurus	A cannibalistic monster, half bull and half man, he was the issue of Queen Pasiphaë's affair with a bull, which had been sent to Crete by Neptunus to be sacrificed, but was spared by Minos. Daedalus created a plinth the shape of a heifer which Pasiphaë could hide inside, in that way making the bull cover her. Minotaurus was killed by Theseus.	VIII: 133-169	
Morpheus	God of dreams.	XI: 635-671	
Myrrha	Granddaughter of Pygmalion, daughter of King Cinyras of Cyprus, and mother of Adonis by Cinyras. She tricked her father into intercourse, but was discovered and fled. After having been on the run for 9 months she asked the gods not to be seen among those alive or dead, and was thus metamorphosed into the myrrh tree. A month later the tree gave birth to Adonis.	X: 317-476	
Myscelus	Son of Alemon and founder of Crotona.	XV: 19-47	
Narcissus	Son of Liriope. He fell in love with his own reflection and wasted away until death. When he died he was metamorphosed into the plant of the same name.	III: 346-413	
Neptunus	God of the sea and waters. Brother of Jupiter. Roman equivalent of the Greek Poseidon.	I: 275–330, II: 270–573, IV: 532–798, V: 370, VI: 71–115, VIII: 851–867, X: 606, XI: 202, XII: 25-585, XIII: 854	
Nessus	Centaur famously known for being mortally wounded by Hercules, and on his deathbed deceiving Hercules' wife, Deïanira, into using his tainted blood to kill Hercules.	IX: 101–153, XII: 308-454	
Nestor	Son of Neleus and king of Pylos.	VIII: 313–365, XII: 169–578, XIII: 63, XV: 65	
Niobe	Daughter of Tantalus and wife of King Amphion of Thebes. Boasted that she had more children than Latona. In revenge the goddess' two children, Diana and Apollo, killed all of Niobe's. In grief she wept until she was turned to stone.	VI: 148-298	
Numa	King of Rome after Romulus.	XV: 3-479	
Nyctimene	A woman from Lesbos. Metamorphosed by Minerva into an owl after she had had intercourse with her father.	II: 590	
Ocyrhoë	Daughter of Chiron and Chariclo; possessed by Apollo in his quality as god of prophecy. She was metamorphosed into a mare.	II: 637-675	
Olenus (1)	Father of Tectaphus the Lapith.	XII: 433	
Olenus (2)	Husband to Lethaea with whom he was turned to stone.	X: 68	
Ops	Sister and wife of Saturnus, and by him mother of Jupiter and the Olympian gods. Roman equivalent of the Greek Rhea.	IX: 497	
Orithyia	Daughter of King Erechtheus of Athens.	VI: 683, VII: 694-695	
Orpheus	Son of Apollo and the Muse Calliope. Legendary musician, poet, and prophet.	X: 3-79, XI: 1-93	
Pan	God of shepherds and the forest with a goat's beard, -horns, and -legs.	I: 699–707, VI: 329, XI: 147–171, XIV: 515	
Paphos	The daughter of Pygmalion and Galatea, mother of Cinyras, and grandmother of Myrrha and Adonis.	X: 297	
Paris	Son of Hecuba and King Priam of Troy. He was famous for seducing and abducting Helen of Sparta (later Helen of Troy) with the help of Venus. Helen's husband, Menelaus, along with Agamemnon invoked The Oath of Tyndareus, thereby starting the Trojan War.	VII: 631, XII: 4–605, XIII: 200–501, XV: 805	
Pegasus	Winged horse, born from the blood of Medusa. Its clops made the spring Hippocrene by Helicon well up.	IV: 786, V: 257–312, VI: 120	
Peleus	Son of Aeacus, brother of Telamon, half-brother of Phocus, and father of Achilles.	VII: 476–669, VIII: 3–380, XI: 217–397, XII: 82-387, XIII: 151–155, XV: 856	
Pelias	Brother of Aeson, from whom he usurped the throne of Iolcus. He later sent Aeson's son Jason to get the golden fleece.	VII: 298-343	
Pentheus	Son of Echion and king of Thebes.	III: 524–730, IV: 22-429	
Perdix	Nephew of Daedalus.	VIII: 251	
Perseus	Son of Danaë and Jupiter. Jupiter fell into Danaë's womb as a golden rain while she was imprisoned in a tower by her father, Acrisius, because it had been foreseen that his daughter's son would cause his death. When Perseus was born, Acrisius put him and his mother in a coffin which he set afloat. The coffin drifted to Seriphus where King Polydectes later wanted Danaë. In order to get rid of Perseus he sent him on the seemingly impossible quest to slay the gorgon Medusa, but Perseus borrowed an invisibility hat, winged sandals, and a scimitar from Mercury and was helped by Minerva.	IV: 611–792, V: 1-250	
Phaedra	Daughter of Pasiphaë and Minos.	XV: 500	
Phaethon	Son of Sol and Clymene.	I: 750–776, II: 19-400, IV: 246, X: 262, XII: 581	
Philemon	Husband of Baucis. Metamorphosed into an oak tree by Zeus	VIII: 631-714	
Philomela	Daughter of Pandion and sister of Procne. She was raped by her brother-in-law, Tereus. To make sure she did not tell Procne he muted her by cutting out her tongue and imprisoned her in a forest. A year later she was rescued by her sister and in revenge the sisters fed Tereus his and Procne's son, Itys. Philomela was metamorphosed into a bird along with her sister and brother-in-law.	VI: 451-657	
Phineus (1)	Brother of Cepheus and betrothed to Andromeda before Perseus. Petrified by the latter.	V: 8-231	
Phineus (2)	Blind king of Salmydessos, Thrace. His sons were seduced by his queen, their stepmother, so he blinded them. As a punishment the harpies would plague him by stealing or tainting his food. He was relieved from the harpies by Zetes and Calais.	VII: 2	
Phocus	Son of Aeacus and the nymph Psamanthe and half-brother of Peleus and Telamon.	VII: 477–796, XI: 267-381	
Picus	Son of Saturnus and king of Laurentum near Rome.	XIV: 320-397	
Pirithous	Son of Ixion, friend of Theseus, and king of the Lapiths.	VIII: 303–567, XII: 210-332	
Polydectes	King of Seriphus. He ordered that Perseus kill the gorgon Medusa to get him apart from his mother, whom Polydectes wanted.	V: 243-249	
Polydorus	Son of Queen Hecuba and King Priam of Troy.	XIII: 431-629	
Polymestor	King of Thrace.	XIII: 430-554	
Polyphemus	Cyclops, son of Neptunus.	XIII: 744–779, XIV: 167-249	
Polyxena	Daughter of Queen Hecuba and King Priam of Troy.	XIII: 448-483	
Pomona	Italic nymph.	XIV: 623-767	
Priam	Son of Laomedon, husband of Hecuba, and last king of Troy.	XI: 758, XII; 607, XIII: 99-519, XIV: 474, XV: 437	
Procne	Daughter of Pandion, wife of Tereus, sister of Philomela, and mother of Itys. She feeds Itys to Tereus after he has raped Philomela and cut out her tongue. She was metamorphosed into a bird along with her sister and husband.	VI: 428-653	
Procris	Daughter of Erechteus of Athens and wife of Cephalus, who accidentally kills her with his hunting spear (which never misses) because he mistook her for a boar.	VI: 681, VII: 694-845	
Proserpina	Daughter of Ceres and Jupiter, wife of Pluto, and queen of the Underworld. She is kidnapped by Pluto and eats of the pomegranate seeds while in the Underworld. She is sentenced by Jove to spend half the year with Ceres, half with Pluto. Roman equivalent of the Greek Persephone.	II: 261, V: 377-555	
Pygmalion	Sculptor from Cyptrus, father of Paphos, grandfather of Cinyras, and great-grandfather of Myrrha and Adonis. A bachelor, Pygmalion sculpts a beautiful woman out of ivory. He falls in love with this statue and prays to Venus to bring it to life. She grants his prayer, and the statue, Galatea, has a daughter with him, Paphos.	X: 243-296	
Pyramus	Young man from Babylon who is the boyfriend of Thisbe whom he is not allowed to marry.	IV: 55-163	
Pyreneus	A tyrant who chases the muses.	V: 274	
Pyrrha	Daughter of Epimetheus (the brother of Prometheus) and wife of her cousin Deucalion.	I: 319-395	
Pythagoras	Ionian philosopher and mathematician from Samos. He is described as a wise man who had gazed at and understood things and the mechanisms behind them; something nature usually denies men to see. In his great speech he teaches among other things about the changeability of everything, the benefits of vegetarianism, and Phoenix.	XV: 60-478	
Quirinus	The name of the deified form of Romulus.	XIV: 828-863	
Romulus	The founder of Rome. Son of Ilia and Mars. He took the name Quirinus upon his deification.	XIV: 799–846, XV: 560	
Saturnus	Roman god of agriculture and harvest. Brother and husband of Ops and father of Jupiter and his siblings. Saturnus led the rebellion against Uranus, but was later overthrown by Jupiter who precipitated him into Tartarus. Roman equivalent of the Greek Cronus.	I: 113, VI: 125, IX: 497, XIV: 320, XV: 858	
Scylla (sea bird)	Daughter of King Nisus of Megara. She fell in love with Minos, king of a besieging army and betrayed her city to him, but he spurned her. Was transformed into a sea bird, pursued by her father who was transformed into a sea eagle.	VIII: 17-104	
Scylla (sea monster)	Daughter of Crataeis. Metamorphosed, by Circe, into a terrifying sea monster on the Italian coast by the Strait of Messina with fierce dogs around her waist, snapping sailors passing by.	VII: 64, XIII: 730–966, XIV: 18-70	
Semele	Daughter of Cadmus and mother of Bacchus by Jupiter.	III: 260–520, IV: 422, V: 329	
Sibyl	Prophetess in Cumae.	XIV: 104–154, XV: 712	
Silenus		XI:85–99, and possibly IV.26	
Sol	Roman god of the Sun, the son of Hyperion. Trusted his chariot to his son Phaethon by Clymene, which resulted in disaster. Witnessed the adultery of Venus and Mars, and informed Venus's husband Vulcanus. For this Venus made him fall in love with Leucothoe, while forgetting his previous lover Clytia.	I: 751, 771, II: 1–394, IV: 170–633, VII: 663, IX: 736, XI: 353, XIII: 853, XIV: 10–375, XV: 30	
Syrinx	Arcadian nymph. To hide from the amorous Pan she was metamorphosed into hollow water reeds.	I: 691-712	
Telamon	Son of Aecus, brother of Peleus, half-brother of Phocus, and father of Ajax.	VII: 476–669, VIII: 3–378, XI: 216, XII: 624, XIII: 22-345	
Tereus	Son of Mars, father of Itys, husband of Procne, and king of Thrace. He raped Philomela (Procne's sister), then cut out her tongue, but was later tricked by Philomela and Procne into eating Itys. Ultimately both sisters and Tereus were metamorphosed into birds.	VI: 424-681	
Themis	Goddess of law, justice, and prophecy and daughter of Uranus (the sky) and Gaia (the earth). She was the predecessor of Apollo as Oracle of Delphi	I: 321–381, IV: 643, IX: 403-418	
Theseus	Son of Aethra and Aegeus. During a visit at King Pittheus of Troizen Aegeus slept with the king's daughter, Aethra. He hid his sword under a rock and told Aethra that if she bore him a son she should tell this son when he was strong enough to remove the rock. He should then travel to Athens with the sign of his origin, the sword.	VII: 404–434, VIII: 262–726, IX: 1, XII: 227–355, XV: 492	
Thetis	Nymph, daughter of Nereus and mother of Achilles.	XI: 221–400, XII: 93–193, XIII: 162-301	
Thisbe	Pyramus' girlfriend whom he is forbidden to wed. When they decide to meet a lioness scares off Thisbe and mutilates the veil she left behind. Pyramus finds the veil and believing Thisbe is dead he kills himself. When Thisbe finds his corpse she kills herself as well. The mulberry fruits were given their stained colour to symbolize the forbidden love.	IV: 55-163	
Tiresias	Blind prophet in Thebes, famous for clairvoyance.	III: 322–516, VI: 157	
Tisiphone	One of the Erinyes.	IV: 474-495	
Triton	Sea god, son of Neptunus.	I: 331, II: 8, XIII: 919	
Ulysses	King of Ithaca. Son of Laërtes and Anticlea.	VIII: 315, XII: 625, XIII: 6–773, XIV: 71-671	
Urania	The muse of astronomy.	V: 260-294	
Venus	Goddess of love. Roman equivalent of the Greek Aphrodite.	I: 463, III: 132, IV: 171–531, V: 331, VII: 802, IX: 424–796, X: 224–717, XIII: 759, XIV: 27-788, XV: 762-843	
Vertumnus	The god of seasons, change and plant growth, as well as gardens and fruit trees. He seduces Pomona.	XIV: 641-765	
Vesta	Goddess of hearth, home and family. She had a sacred fire which was tended to by six virgin priestesses, Vestals, and which was connected to the safety of the city. The priestesses were severely punished if the fire went out and it was to be rekindled from the rays of the sun if that happened. Roman equivalent of the Greek Hestia.	XV: 730-865	
Virbius	Name of the deified form of Hippolytus.	XV: 544	
Vulcanus	God of forging and fire. Son of Jupiter and Juno and husband of Venus. Forged among other things the weapons of Achilles. Roman equivalent of the Greek Hephaistos.	II: 106–437, IX: 251, XII: 614	

== See also ==
- After Ovid: New Metamorphoses
- Cultural influence of Metamorphoses
- Latin literature

== Links ==
- List of characters with images and bibliography
