= Macaria (disambiguation) =

Macaria is the name of two figures from ancient Greek religion and mythology.

Macaria may also refer to:

== Places ==
- Macaria (Arcadia), a town of ancient Arcadia, Greece
- Măcăria River, a tributary of the Gilort River in Romania

== Arts and entertainment ==
- Macaria (actress) (born 1949), Mexican actress
- Macaria (novel), by Augusta Jane Evans, published in 1864

== Science ==
- Macaria (moth), a genus of moths in the family Geometridae

== See also ==
- A Description of the Famous Kingdome of Macaria, a work of utopian fiction, published in England in 1641
- Macar
- Macarius
