= Olenus (disambiguation) =

Olenus is one of a number of figures in Greek mythology.

Olenus may also refer to:

- Olenus (Achaea), a city of ancient Achaea, Greece
- Olenus (Aetolia), a city of ancient Aetolia, Greece
- Olenus (Galatia), a city of ancient Galatia, now in Turkey
- Olenus (trilobite), a genus of trilobites
