= 10370 Hylonome =

Outer solar system centaur

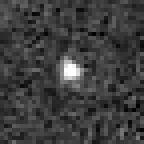
- Hubble Space Telescope image of Hylonome taken in 2009

Discovery
- Discovered by: D. C. Jewitt; J. X. Luu
- Discovery site: Mauna Kea Obs.
- Discovery date: 27 February 1995

Designations
- Pronunciation: /haɪˈlɒnəmiː/
- Named after: Ὑλονόμη Hylonomē (Greek mythology)
- Alternative designations: 1995 DW_{2}
- Minor planet category: centaur · distant Neptune-crosser; Uranus-grazer
- Symbol: (astrological)

Orbital characteristics
- Epoch 4 September 2017 (JD 2458000.5)
- Uncertainty parameter 3
- Observation arc: 15.27 yr (5,576 days)
- Aphelion: 31.393 AU
- Perihelion: 18.910 AU
- Semi-major axis: 25.152 AU
- Eccentricity: 0.2482
- Orbital period (sidereal): 126.14 yr (46,073 days)
- Mean anomaly: 63.271°
- Mean motion: 0° 0^{m} 28.08^{s} / day
- Inclination: 4.1443°
- Longitude of ascending node: 178.08°
- Argument of perihelion: 7.0279°
- Jupiter MOID: 13.4570 AU
- T_{Jupiter}: 4.4550

Physical characteristics
- Mean diameter: 70±20 km 74±16 km
- Geometric albedo: 0.051±0.030
- Spectral type: BR (intermed. blue-red)
- Absolute magnitude (H): 8.6; 9.08±0.04 (R); 9.250±0.131 (R); 9.35; 9.51±0.08; 9.53

10370 Hylonome (/haɪˈlɒnəmiː/; provisional designation 1995 DW_{2}) is a minor planet orbiting in the outer Solar System. The dark and icy body belongs to the class of centaurs and measures approximately 72 kilometers (45 miles) in diameter. It was discovered on 27 February 1995, by English astronomer David C. Jewitt and Vietnamese American astronomer Jane Luu at the U.S. Mauna Kea Observatory in Hawaii, and later named after the mythological creature Hylonome.

== Classification and orbit ==
Centaurs are a large population of icy bodies in transition between trans-Neptunian objects (TNOs) and Jupiter-family comets (JFCs), their orbits being unstable due to perturbations by the giant planets. Currently, Uranus controls Hylonome's perihelion and Neptune its perihelion.

Hylonome is a carbonaceous C-type body that orbits the Sun in the outer main-belt at a distance of 18.9–31.4 astronomical units (AU) once every 126 years and 2 months (46,073 days). Its orbit has an eccentricity of 0.25 and an inclination of 4° with respect to the ecliptic. It is a Neptune-crosser, and an outer-grazer of the orbit of Uranus, which it hence does not cross. Its minimum orbital intersection distance with Neptune and Uranus is 0.35854 and 0.52875 AU, respectively.

It is estimated to have a relatively long orbital half-life of about 6.37 million years.

== Naming ==
This minor planet was named for Hylonome, a female centaur in Greek mythology. In the epic tragedy, she lost her husband, the handsome centaur Cyllarus, who was accidentally killed by a spear. Heartbroken, she then took her own life by throwing herself on the spear. The official naming citation was published on 26 July 2000 (M.P.C. 41030).

A symbol derived from that for 2060 Chiron,, was devised in the late 1990s by German astrologer Robert von Heeren. It replaces Chiron's K with a Greek capital upsilon (Υ) for Hylonome (Ὑλονόμη).

== Physical characteristics ==
=== Size and color ===
Comparison of sizes, albedos, and colors of various large centaurs with measured diameters. Hylonome is shown in the bottom row, third from left.

Observations with the infrared Spitzer Space Telescope indicate a diameter of 70±20 kilometers, whereas the Collaborative Asteroid Lightcurve Link assumes a standard albedo for carbonaceous bodies of 0.057, giving it a diameter of 75.1 kilometers with an absolute magnitude of 9.35.

A study in 2014, using data from Spitzer's Multiband Imaging Photometer (MIPS) and Herschel's Photodetector Array Camera and Spectrometer, gave a low albedo of 0.051±0.030 and a diameter of 74±16 kilometers, based on an absolute magnitude of 9.51±0.08. The study concluded that among the observed population of centaurs, there is no correlation between their sizes, albedos, and orbital parameters. However, the smaller the centaur, the more reddish it is.

== See also ==
- List of centaurs (small Solar System bodies) § 10370
