= Château de Pompignan =

18th-century château in Tarn-et-Garonne, France

Coordinates: 43°49′2.73″N 1°18′46.43″E

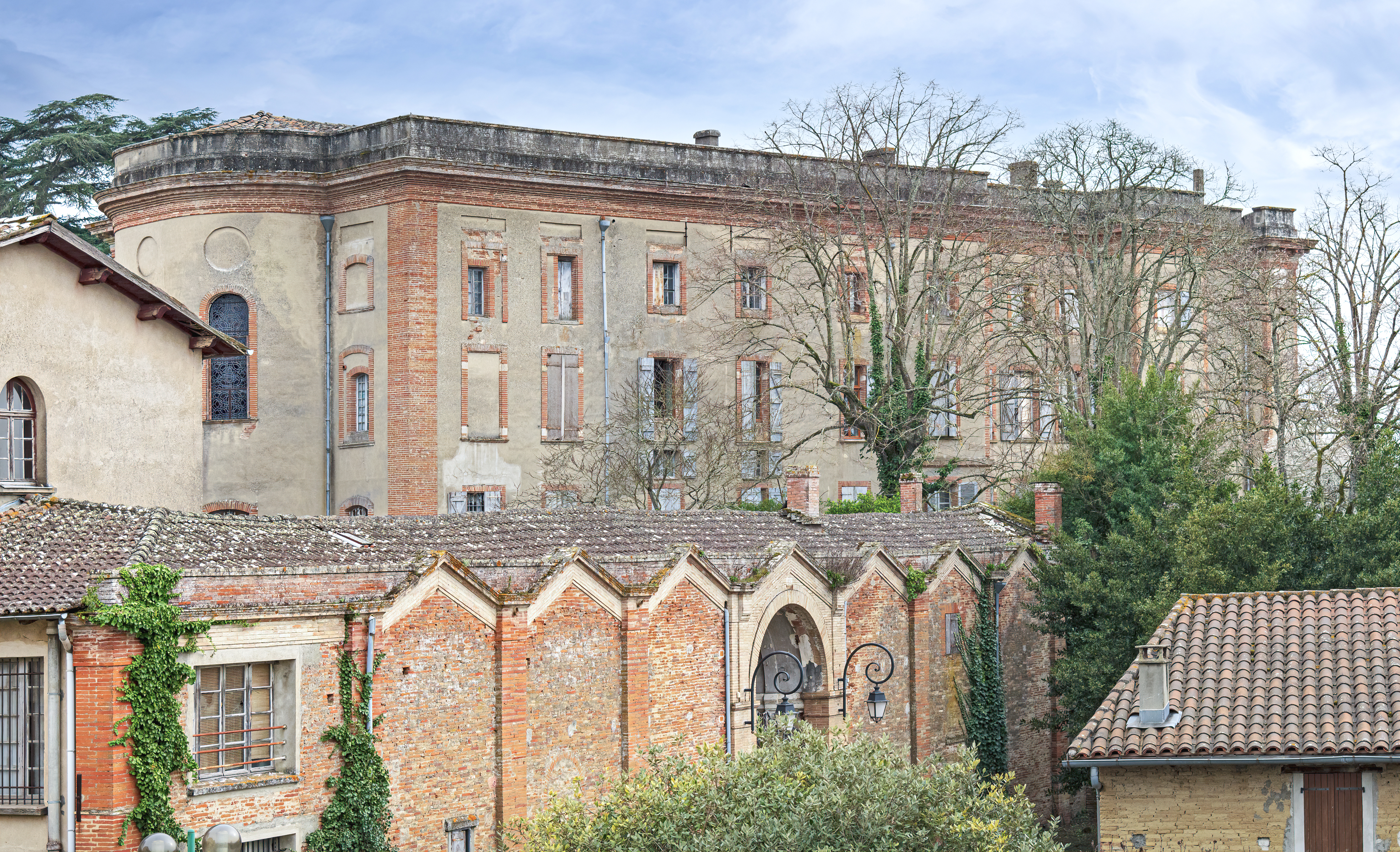
Château de Pompignan

The Château de Pompignan is a mid-18th-century château standing on a terrace above the village of Pompignan, Tarn-et-Garonne, which lies on the old Paris road (now the D820), about 25 km north-west of Toulouse, France.

Of some literary and historical interest because of the association with its builder, Jean-Jacques Lefranc, the first Marquis de Pompignan, the château is noteworthy today for containing in its grounds a good example, though in neglected and dilapidated condition, of a parc à fabriques - a landscape garden with architectural constructions and hydraulic systems (together known in English as follies).

Acquired by its present owner in 1990, the chateau itself is in good repair, though sparsely furnished, as it serves to house the owner's collection of keyboard instruments. This may be the largest private collection in France of keyboard instruments from around the world. Refurbishment work on the château is in progress with the object of creating a permanent museum to display this collection to the general public. Within the grounds, a deconsecrated church provides a 200-seat concert hall, and in recent years international piano competitions have been held there.

In May 2011, a decision was taken to route the proposed new TGV line from Bordeaux to Toulouse through the grounds of the château. While the building itself and its entrance lodge have been listed as a historic monument since 1951, and classified as such since 1972, the protection does not extend directly to the remainder of the park or its contents.

== Description of the chateau ==
The village of Pompignan is located a day's journey (25 km) from Toulouse on the natural road along the right bank of the Garonne to Bordeaux, and it was a way stop even in pre-Roman times. Its name is derived from Pompinianum, the domain of Pompinius, a notable of the Gallo-Roman era, whose villa was sited on the edge of the hillside about a kilometer south of the present chateau. There is evidence to suggest that a ninth-century feudal manor house existed on or close to the present chateau site. The modern village grew up at the foot of the chateau in the time of the Lefrancs, and its layout and facilities were shaped by the needs and gifts of the owners.

The chateau was built on the foundations of the existing manor house in the emerging neo-classical style, similar in some respects to the Petit Trianon at Versailles (built between 1762 and 1768, a few years later than Pompignan). However, while the fenestration proportions are similar, the facades at Pompignan are much less ornate, relying for their decorative effect on brickwork details, the play of colour between brick and rendering, and on the indentations produced by the short nibs at the centre and either end of the main (south-eastern) façade. Both buildings are oriented towards views of landscape gardens, but Pompignan was planned as such, whereas the hameau at the Petit Trianon was added twenty years afterwards, by a different architect and patron.

The terrace on which the chateau sits, some ten to twenty metres above the village, is girdled with a massive brick retaining wall, in good condition, which is a listed item in the protection notices.

Lefranc’s chateau is built on a stone base, mainly from pink Toulouse brick, with delicate use of gray render to achieve a tawny effect in good light. It is carefully oriented (along a northwest-southeast axis) to take advantage of existing natural views created by its position on a terrace overlooking the valley of the Garonne to the west and the rising hillside to the east. Nearly all the windows, and the terraces on three sides, provide excellent views. The fourth side consists of a library with clerestory and stained-glass windows, and it overlooks the entry gate-lodge, farm buildings and church.

The plan of the chateau is a rectangle of some 18m by 50m, with a semi-circular two-story bay on the north side. A sketch of the facade dating from 1802 shows a one-story columned semi-circular portico at the central nib, and a one-story bay extension to the southern nib. These are no longer in place.

The monuments listings (refs 4 and 5 below) note "... [a] ground floor, two tiled floors, an attic floor ..." and "... a semi-circular part on the north facade which was once occupied by a theater." Although undocumented here, there is also an extensive basement level. The 'habitable' floor area, at 2,700 sqm without counting the bay, is almost twice that of the Petit Trianon, and more than half that of the Grand Trianon.

Work began in 1745, and received further impetus - and funding - with Lefranc's marriage in 1757. The Toulousian architect Nelle (or Nelli) was in charge of the works, which probably took place in two phases. The renovated church, and hence certainly the main building, was in place by 1762, thus pre-dating the Petit Trianon by several years. This phase included the construction of the retaining and boundary walls, and improvements to the chateau de Monplaisir. It is clear from documents preserved in the family archives that the Marquis de Pompignan was personally involved with the architectural conception and the ornamentation of the buildings, evidenced by letters, plans, designs and annotations in his own hand.

After he left Paris definitively in 1763, Lefranc was again able to devote more of his attention to the garden project, and major structural elements were put in place between 1766 and 1774. It was finally judged complete by its author (who was then 71 years old) in 1780, 35 years after he had started.

Jean-Georges-Louis-Marie Lefranc de Pompignan (1760–1840), son of the builder, inherited the estate on the death of his father in 1784. Like his father, he too married well, and was in a position to attend to his country estates. It appears as if he also commissioned works in the park, and it is not possible at present to distinguish which Lefranc was responsible for which part of the garden.

== The park and its follies ==
The main façade looks out over lawns with magnificent specimen trees, then across undulating meadows which give glimpses of the follies and water features, and finally upwards over the rising forest until the view is cut off at the horizon created by the top of the ridge. No buildings are visible from this direction. (The planned railway line - see below - will run parallel to this façade at a distance of some 250m.)

In the opposite direction, the windows facing a little north of west overlook the church and small village of Pompignan, through which run, in parallel and only some 60m apart at this point, the main road from Toulouse to Montauban and, west of it, the Canal de Garonne. Beyond lies the flat valley of the Garonne and the low hills of the Gers.

On a clear day, the Pyrenees are visible along the southern horizon, and the short southern façade faces the mountains more directly, while also allowing the remainder of the village, the road and the canal to be observed in the direction of Toulouse.

The terrace on which the chateau and its lawns sit forms the point of a promontory, and the park stretches away from it to the east, enclosing a thickly-wooded valley of undulating and then rising land some 35 hectares in extent. The park’s long south-eastern boundary is formed by the road running along the edge of the ridge above, the chemin de la moissagaise, part of the ancient pilgrimage Way of St James that leads from Moissac, some 40 km downstream, to Compostella in Spain. Within the park just off this road is a small shrine, which still receives visits, especially in the months of May and June, the traditional time of the pilgrimage.

=== The idea of the park ===
The design of the chateau is representative of the move away from the extreme ornamentation and grandiosity of buildings prevailing at the end of the 17th and early 18th centuries and the move towards simpler and more classical lines. This tendency was echoed in garden design by a move away from formal, 'French' gardens, and towards the ideas incorporated in the 'English' garden which was coming into vogue in France by the mid-18th century: informal, natural-seeming, painterly landscapes, enhanced with built structures (follies) to accompany views, disguise functional structures, create moods or references to landscapes from antiquity or imagined.

Lefranc spent much of his early life in the Château de Cayx, where some of the inspiration (in terms of siting, landscape and views) for Pompignan is found. Cayx had at least one folly as well, a belvedere, which Lefranc converted into his study, and in which he wrote Didon (1734), his first literary success.

He began thinking about the garden long before he started work on it, evidenced by his description of a visit to Fontaine-de-Vaucluse in 1740. The fragment documenting this contains only a description of the scenic valley, but the village was home to Petrarch, who famously described his two gardens there: one created by the river and its cliffs, for admiration and inspiration, but inaccessible; the other near his house beside the river, where ... art surmounts nature ... and where he ... gathered the labourers, the fishermen and the shepherds; we rolled giant stones, built up a fortification against the Nymphs (that is, the river in spate), we carved out an altar for the Muses; soon we could see the Helicon, Parnassus, the Hippocrene; and we planted the forest of the poets.

=== The park as it was - the carnet de 1802 ===
In 1802, a series of pencil drawings of the chateau and its park (the carnet or notebook of 1802) was created by an unsigned hand which depict some of the fabriques as they existed at the time of the visit.

The Gaulish temple

There is an image of a small hexagonal temple, surmounted by a miniature portico, and nearby a statue of St Bonaventure. The ruins of this folly - though not the statue - still exist, on a small rise in clear view of someone leaving the chateau, but all that remains now is the exposed brick frame, showing the arched opes but without an upper structure.

The Egyptian tomb

This folly draws on architectural themes from ancient Egypt, although the form is not pyramidal. There is an obelisk nearby, carved with hieroglyphs and borne on the back of four tortoises. It was possible to access the building through an underground passage. The path to this monument was cut out of the hillside and several bridges were used to overcome differences in level. The Egyptian tomb is the only folly to survive to the present with its structure essentially intact.

The Gothic bridge

A high-arched, steeply-approached bridge in Gothic style with decorated balustrades is shown spanning a stream. It no longer exists.

Mount Parnassus

At the edge of the park there is a little hill or mound, surrounded by a large estate wall which is entered through a formal gated doorway. This was, according to the note on the drawing . . . Mount Parnassus, on which Mr de Pompignan the elder (i.e. Jean-Jacques, the first marquis) composed some of his poetry. The raised area still existed in 1911.

The hermitage

This was a small building in the classical style, intended to bring to mind the shelter constructed in a remote place by a hermit; the retreat of the sage, a place to foster philosophy. Its location within the park is not known.

The old monument and the little tomb

This drawing shows two follies, which must have been near to each other. The monument is sketched as two columns carrying a pediment, but details are too sparse to make out whether it was a portico, a fountain or a little temple. There is an annotation on the sketch regarding the tomb: "An ancient tomb built by Mr. de Pompignan, in black marble, with two urns coming from near Toulouse", suggesting that the results of archeological digs were re-utilised in the garden.

The monument to friendship, to hope, to memory, to regret

At the centre of a circular green space stands a little altar with an inscription and bearing a funerary urn. It transforms the setting into a place of memory, conducive to melancholy.

The house of poor Jeanne

At the edge of a grove of trees lies a little thatched country house, by the bank of a stream which crosses a ditch. The weeping willow adds a note of sweet melancholy to a typical rural scene. It is the house of a poor woman, and is designed to evoke the cabin of Baucis and Philemon.

The column

A funerary column in brick, which seems to have commemorative connotations, supports "an infant in fired clay, almost naked, with a crest placed behind him, upset and wiping his tears with a cloth". The column is still extant, visible from the chateau at the edge of the lawn, but Cranga reports that by 1981 the statue had been replaced by a mythical monster; and his own photograph shows the column deeply overgrown with ivy.

== Ownership history ==
The seigneury, or feudal lordship, of Pompignan was in the hands of the Maurand family, before passing to the Galards, then to the viscounts of Terride, and to others again, before its acquisition by Jaques Lefranc.

Buildings on the site of the present chateau have been documented since at least the 16th century, when it was owned by a family called Viçoise. The building was renovated when the property came into the hands of the Caumont-Montbeton family in the 17th century.

Jacques Lefranc came to own the property sometime in the early years of the 18th century. The family were originally landlords of the Château de Cayx (or see Château de Caïx on French Wiki, which gives more detail), some 12 km northwest of Cahors, where they had served since 1640 as hereditary presidents of the regional Cours des Aides, which was located there. When Louise XIV ordered the court to be moved to Montauban (some 60 km south of Cahors over difficult roads), during the presidency of Jacques Lefranc in the early years of the century, the family purchased the lands at Pompignan (some 20 km to the southwest of Montauban) as their local residence.

Jean-Jacques Lefranc, Jacques’ eldest son, was raised mainly at Cayx, and in his earlier years styled himself "Lefranc de Caix". He began his association with the Cours des Aides in 1730, and took over its presidency in 1747. He began working on the chateau in 1745, a project that was to take 35 years to complete. His marriage to a rich and ambitious widow in 1757 obviated the need to work for the state, and she encouraged his literary and paid for his architectural projects.

Jean-Jacques Lefranc was elevated to the marquisate by royal appointment, for services rendered (in defending monarchical and ecclesiastical powers against opposition generated by the Encyclopédistes) in 1763, and from this point his garden began to get recognition as a proper parc du chateau (that is, of a marquis).

His son, Jean-Georges-Louis-Lefranc de Pompignan (1760–1840) inherited the chateau and the marquisate on the death of his father in 1784.

John Stuart Mill, the English thinker and politician, began a formative year visiting France at the age of 14 with a two-week stay at Pompignan in June 1820. In long letters to his father (who financed the educational trip), the precocious Mill details his extensive reading in the library of the chateau, including almost one work per day by Voltaire, Lefranc's main enemy, without once referring to the marquis' own works. Even by then something of a connoisseur of gardens, he walked in what he called the 'pleasure grounds' of the chateau almost every day, and sometimes to the plateau above (whose views he was to recall later, in other works), without ever giving any detail on the park itself. Mills was in Pompignan as a guest of Samuel Bentham, who was renting a property in the grounds, giving weight to the belief that the marquis (the second) was impecunious at that point. But we can take it that the garden must have been in good order during Mill's visit, or he would have remarked on it.

Jean-Georges Lefranc gifted the estate in 1823 to his son, Jean-Marie-Claude-Alphonse (1788–1869), on the occasion of his marriage to the owner of the château d’Hordosse near Nérac, about 100 km away in the Lot-et-Garonne. The third marquis was the last to reside at Pompignan, transferring his activities to his wife's residence, and selling the chateau (while his father was still living) to another nobleman, Alexandre-César, Comte de la Panouse, in 1833. By that time, the landscape garden was neglected and had become a wooded area; in 1842 the departmental archives record complaints of lack of maintenance and tree overgrowth causing damage to the church, which was demolished in 1844, the materials being re-used to build the present St Gregory's.

A. de Bray, collector-general of finance of Haute-Garonne, owned the property sometime before its purchase by J.-G. Coustou-Coysevox, who between 1866 and 1869 installed the editorial offices of Moniteur de l’Archéologie in the chateau.

Adrien Hébrard, director of Le Temps, acquired and modified the château according to the taste of the day. It is to him we owe the achievement, by Gaston Virebent and his son, of the grand dining room, whose walls are clad with ceramic panels carrying a blue pattern set into the wooden paneling, itself highlighted by gilding – and the restructuring of the park. However, the restructuring involved ... the destruction of an admirable park whose trees furnished wood to a sawmill for two years ...

The estate was purchased sometime in 1928 by the Dominicaines de l'Immaculée Conception, an order of Dominican sisters who catered to the needs of blind children. They transformed the place to suit their needs - converting the library to a chapel, the orangery into a retreat house, and the attics into dormitories. They also concealed some of the stuccowork sculptures of classical figures installed by Lefranc, but these have now been revealed again. In 1929 the mother house and novitiate moved from Toulouse to Pompignan. The chateau was sold again when the order moved back to Toulouse in 1987.

== Proposed railway through the park of the chateau ==
=== Route of proposed railway through grounds ===
The proposed railway line is to consist of two sets of tracks, a high-speed line above ground, carried partially on a viaduct across the valley floor, and a TGV line which will run through the park in a tunnel. The lines are to run parallel to each other, 150m apart, for about 500m from north to south through the central and widest part of the park, neatly bisecting both the valley above the chateau and the main stream running through it which feeds the hydraulic system.

=== Other route options to be explored ===
Some of the villages along the proposed line formed an association, Unions pour la Sauvegarde des Villages (USV in documents. ~ Associations for Saving the Villages), to promote an alternative route. This would leave the existing line near St Jory, about 10 km south of the point it is now due to make the eastward turn, and rejoin the proposed route just after Pompignan, but above it and out of sight.

On 28 September 2010 a directive (in French) was issued by minister Jean-Louis Borloo, in political charge of the project. In relation to the sector containing Pompignan, and in response to representations made by local communities, three alternative routes were examined and compared with the route (through the chateau's park) originally proposed, which is still considered on balance the most favourable.

However, according to the minister, the proposals advocated by USV (essentially running the tracks close to the existing A62 motorway, which mounts the scarp at a shallower angle some 10 km south of Pompignan), merited study in more depth before a decision could be made. These two options were therefore to be studied and compared in detail, the results to be available by the beginning of 2011, with a view to seeing whether the proposals of the communities could be accommodated.

On 17 February a meeting was held between Thierry Mariani, secretary of state for transport, and the USV representative Thierry Fourcassier. The USV sought assurances that the comparative in-depth analysis of the "D" and "USV" route alternatives would be continued. The Secretary stated:

"At the moment the study of the “D” route which has been investigated for longer than the “USV” route is definitely more advanced. Some elected representatives approached me to request approval of the “D” route from the month of March and without completing the comparative analysis. I refused: No decision between the “D” and “USV” routes will be taken without having the detailed results of the legitimate multi-criteria comparative analysis, which seems likely to be ready sometime in May.”

=== Decision ===
On 3 June 2011, Minister Nathalie Kosciusko-Morizet informed the regional and departmental prefect that the "D" route had been selected for detailed studies which would lead to the final track routing.

== See also ==
- French landscape garden
