= Anaxithea =

In Greek mythology, Anaxithea (Ancient Greek: Ἀναξιθέα, lit. 'royal goddess' or 'master/ ruler among goddesses') was one of the Danaides, the fifty daughters of King Danaus. By Zeus, she is known as the mother of Olenus who became the legendary ruler and namesake of the ancient city of Olenus in Achaea. In some alternative accounts, Olenus's mother is instead named as Hippodamia.
