= Jean Georges Lefranc de Pompignan =

French clergyman (1715-1790)

- Archbishop of Vienne
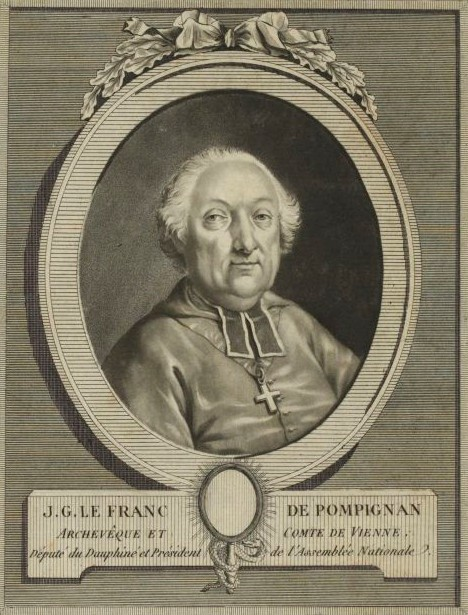
- Jean Georges Lefranc de Pompignan, (Musée de la Révolution française)
- Church: Catholic Church
- Archdiocese: Archdiocese of Vienne
- In office: 9 May 1774 – 14 December 1789
- Predecessor: Guillaume d'Hugues de la Motte
- Successor: Charles François d'Aviau du Bois de Sanzay
- Previous post: Bishop of Le Puy-en-Velay (1743-1774)

Orders
- Consecration: 11 August 1743 by Michel de Verthamon de Chavagnac

Personal details
- Born: 22 February 1715 Montauban, Guyenne, Kingdom of France
- Died: 29 December 1790 (aged 75) Paris, Kingdom of France

Jean Georges Lefranc de Pompignan (22 February 1715 in Montauban – 29 December 1790 in Paris) was a French clergyman, younger brother of Jean-Jacques Lefranc, Marquis de Pompignan.

== Life ==
His father, Jacques Lefranc, was president of the Cour des Aides; and his mother, Mademoiselle de Caulet, was the daughter of a man who held a judicial rank in the Parlement de Toulouse. He was born in Montauban, and was raised at the family's Château de Cayx in Cahors.

Like his brother, he studied with the Jesuits at the Collège de Clermont, and then with the Sulpicians.

Pompignan was Bishop of Le Puy from 1743 to 1774. As archbishop of Vienne his defense of the faith against Voltaire launched the good-natured mockery of Les Lettres d'un Quaker. He supported the Archbishop of Paris in lobbying for Louis XVI to follow tradition and hold his coronation at Reims Cathedral rather than at Paris as recommended by Minister Turgot.

Elected to the Estates General, he passed over to the Liberal side, and led the 149 members of the clergy who united with the third estate to form the National Assembly. He was one of its first presidents, and was minister of public worship when the Civil Constitution of the Clergy was forced upon the clergy.
