= Crinacus =

In Greek mythology, Crinacus (Ancient Greek: Κρίνακος, romanized: Krīnakos) or Crineus (Κρίνειος, lit. 'judge' or 'one who discerns') was the second king of Olenus in Achaea after succeeding the eponymous Olenus, son of Zeus. He was another bastard son of Zeus as well, and the father of Macar who became the king of Lesbos. In some accounts, Crinacus' father was called Hyrieus, eponymous king of Hyria in Boeotia.
