= Métamorphoses (2014 film) =

- Film poster
- Directed by: Christophe Honoré
- Screenplay by: Christophe Honoré
- Based on: Metamorphoses by Ovid
- Produced by: Philippe Martin
- Starring: Amira Akili; Sébastien Hirel; Damien Chapelle; Mélodie Richard; George Babluani
- Cinematography: André Chemetoff
- Edited by: Chantal Hymans
- Production companies: France 3 Cinéma; Les Films Pelléas; Le Pacte
- Distributed by: Sophie Dulac Distribution
- Release dates: 26 August 2014 (Venice); 3 September 2014 (France)
- Running time: 102 minutes
- Country: France
- Language: French
- Box office: € 4 million

Métamorphoses (Transformations) is a 2014 French drama film written and directed by Christophe Honoré and starring Amira Akili, Sébastien Hirel, Damien Chapelle, Mélodie Richard and George Babluani.

The film consists of a linked series of reworkings (in present-day settings) of episodes from the narrative poem of the same name by the Roman poet Ovid. It was screened in the Venice Days section at the 71st Venice International Film Festival.

== Synopsis ==
Leaving her school, a young woman meets a handsome but strange young man. Attracted by the stories he tells her, she is fascinated by tales of gods and young mortals. The film recounts the encounter first of Jupiter and Europe, with the male god in the form of seducer, pygmalion, initiator. Bacchus then illustrates the necessity to believe in the myths of gods, or else to suffer for one's impiety. Lastly there is Orpheus and his proselytism, his teaching and his prophecy; a sect groups itself around him up to his violent death. The stories are linked by Europe, a young woman who grows through experiencing the worlds of these three characters, watching, following them from her state of innocence.

== Cast ==
- Matthis Lebrun as Actéon
- Samantha Avrillaud as Diane
- Amira Akili as Europe
- Sébastien Hirel as Jupiter
- Mélodie Richard as Junon
- Coralie Rouet as Io
- Nadir Sönmez as Mercure
- Vincent Massimino as Argus
- Olivier Müller as Pan
- Myriam Guizani as Syrinx
- Gabrielle Chuiton as Baucis
- Jean Courte as Philémon
- Rachid O as Tirésias
- Arthur Jacquin as Narcisse
- Damien Chapelle as Bacchus
- Julien Antonini as the hermaphrodite
- Marlène Saldana as Salmacis
- Yannick Guyomard as Penthée
- Jimmy Lenoir as Cadmus
- George Babluani as Orphée
- Vimala Pons as Atalante
- Erwan Ha-Kyoon Larcher as Hippomène
- Keti Bicolli as Venus

== Production ==
Filming took place between 13 May and June 2013. The film was shot in Nîmes, Montpellier and surrounding areas.

== Music ==
The sound track includes sections of Mozart's overture to Zaide, Schoenberg's Verklärte Nacht, Webern's String Quartet op.5, Ravel's Rapsodie Espagnole and Daphnis et Chloé, and several works by Baxter Dury.

== See also ==
- Cultural influence of Metamorphoses
- List of French films of 2014
