= Euryteiae =

Ancient Greek village

Euryteiae or Euryteiai (Ancient Greek: Εὐρυτειαί) was a village of ancient Achaea in the neighbourhood of Olenus, and one of the places to which the inhabitants of Olenus fled upon leaving their city.
