= Pompignan, Tarn-et-Garonne =

Pompignan Pompinhan (Occitan)
- Commune
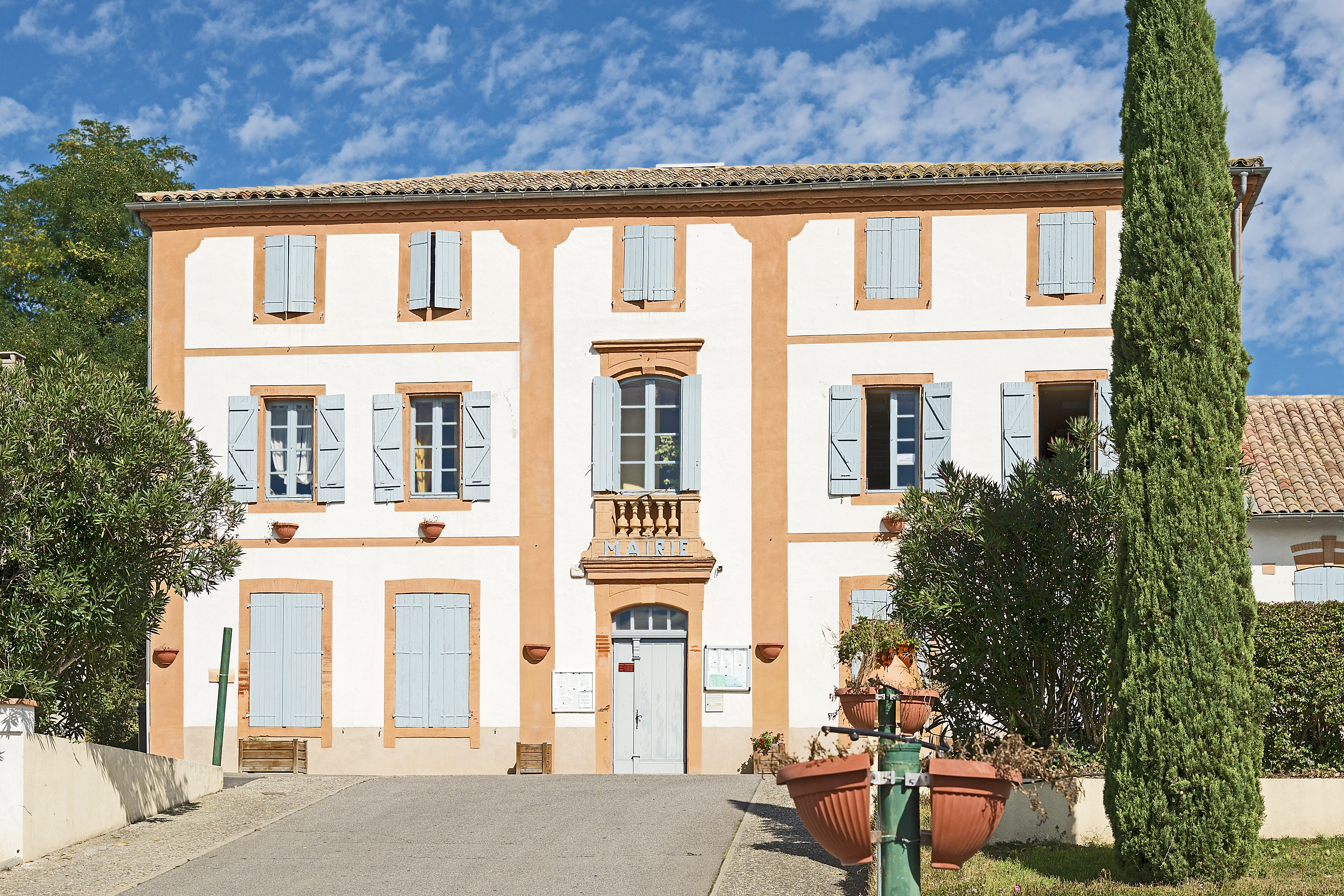
- Pompignan Town Hall

- Coat of arms
- Location of Pompignan
- Location within France Location within Occitanie
- Coordinates: 43°49′04″N 1°18′48″E
- Country: France
- Region: Occitania
- Department: Tarn-et-Garonne
- Arrondissement: Montauban
- Canton: Verdun-sur-Garonne

Government
  - Mayor (2020–2026): Yan Fabregues
- Area^{1}: 12.17 km^{2} (4.70 sq mi)
- Elevation: 108 m (354 ft)
- Highest elevation: 216 m (709 ft)
- Lowest elevation: 102 m (335 ft)
- Population (2023): 1,866
  - Density: 153.3/km^{2} (397.1/sq mi)
- Time zone: UTC+01:00 (CET)
  - Summer (DST): UTC+02:00 (CEST)
- INSEE/Postal code: 82142 /82170
- ^{1} French Land Register data, which excludes lakes, ponds, glaciers > 1 km^{2} (0.386 sq mi or 247 acres) and river estuaries.

Pompignan (French pronunciation: [pɔ̃piɲɑ̃]; Occitan: Pompinhan) is a commune in the Tarn-et-Garonne department in the Occitania region in Southern France.

The Château de Pompignan, a mid-18th century neoclassical building, sits on a terrace above the village. Its builder, Jean-Jacques Lefranc de Pompignan is renowned as an Enlightenment figure, and he created on the hillside rising up behind the chateau an extensive landscape garden with follies, which has remained largely untouched since the early 19th century.

Today the chateau, in private hands, houses a very large collection of keyboard instruments, and serves as a venue for concerts and musical events. It is also available for rental as an event venue.

Lefranc also built the village a church, within the grounds of the chateau, but it fell into disrepair and was replaced in 1844 with the present church of St Gregory, the old church materials being reused. To adorn his then-new church, Lefranc acquired splendid church furniture from the Jesuits in 1762, when they were compelled to leave Paris, and these objects (marble altars, reliquaries, paintings, gilded monstrances, confessionals ...) are now housed in St Gregory's, where many of the pieces have been listed as historic monuments.

== Monument ==
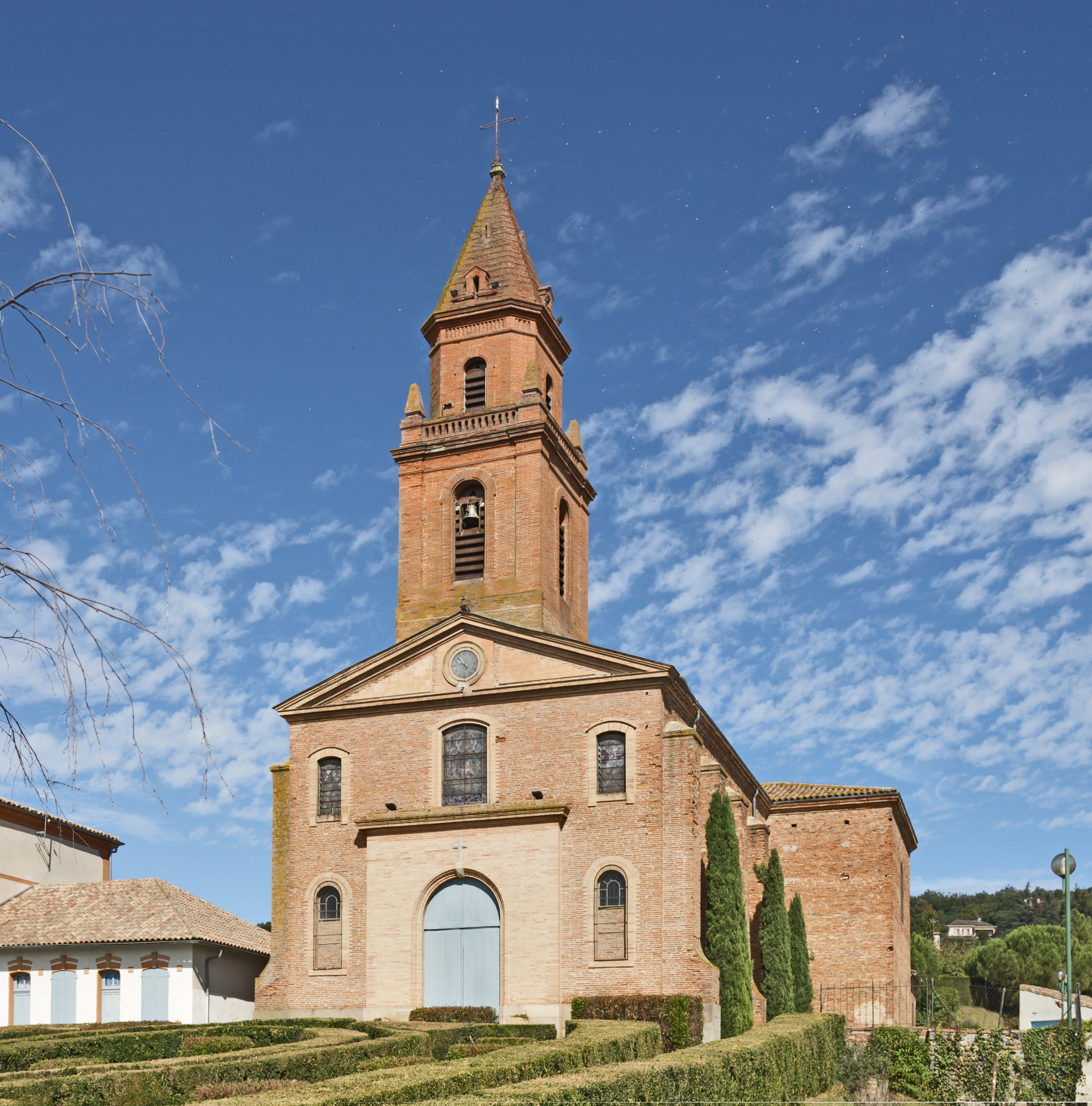
Church of St. Gregory - Facade

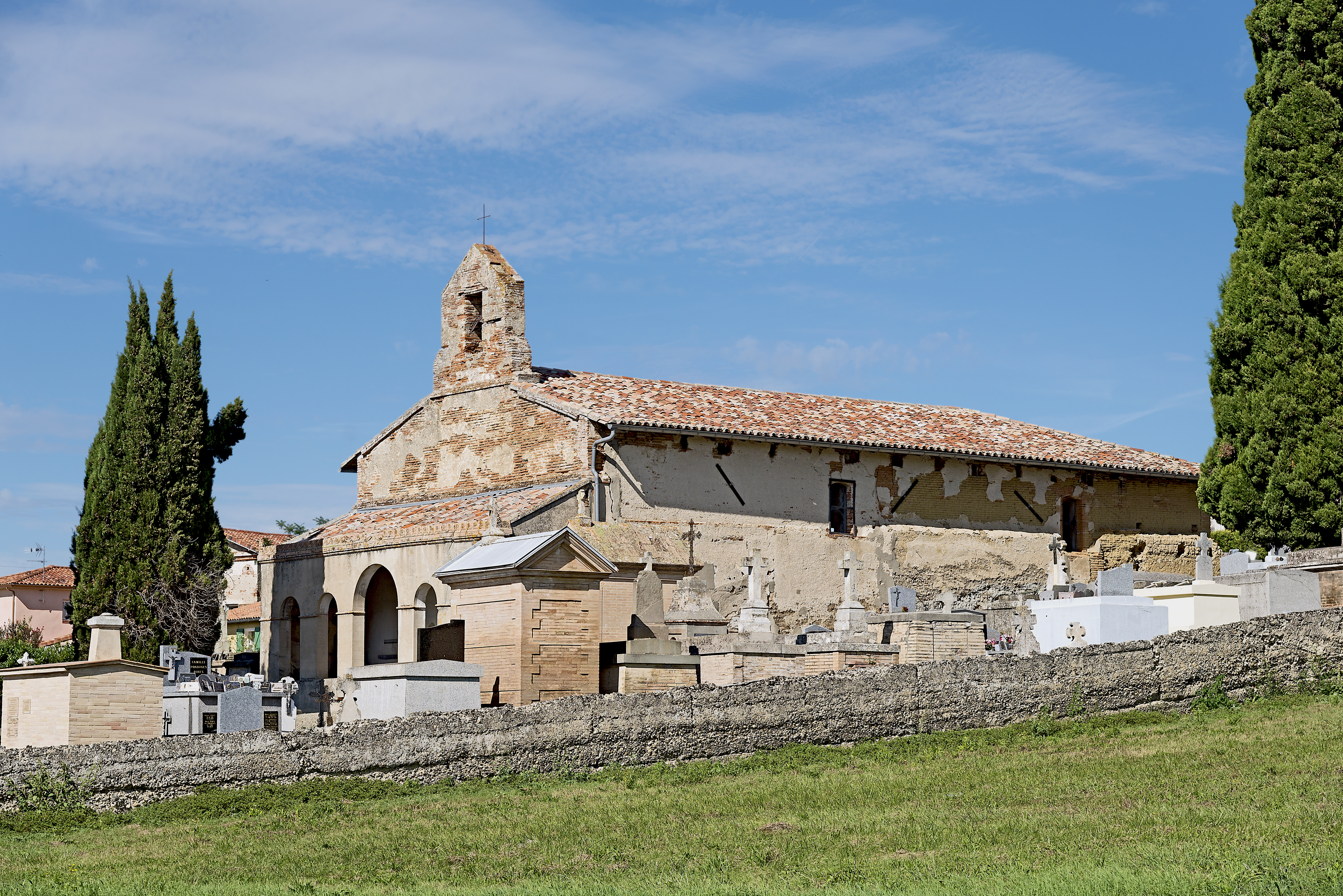
Chapelle Saint-Clair

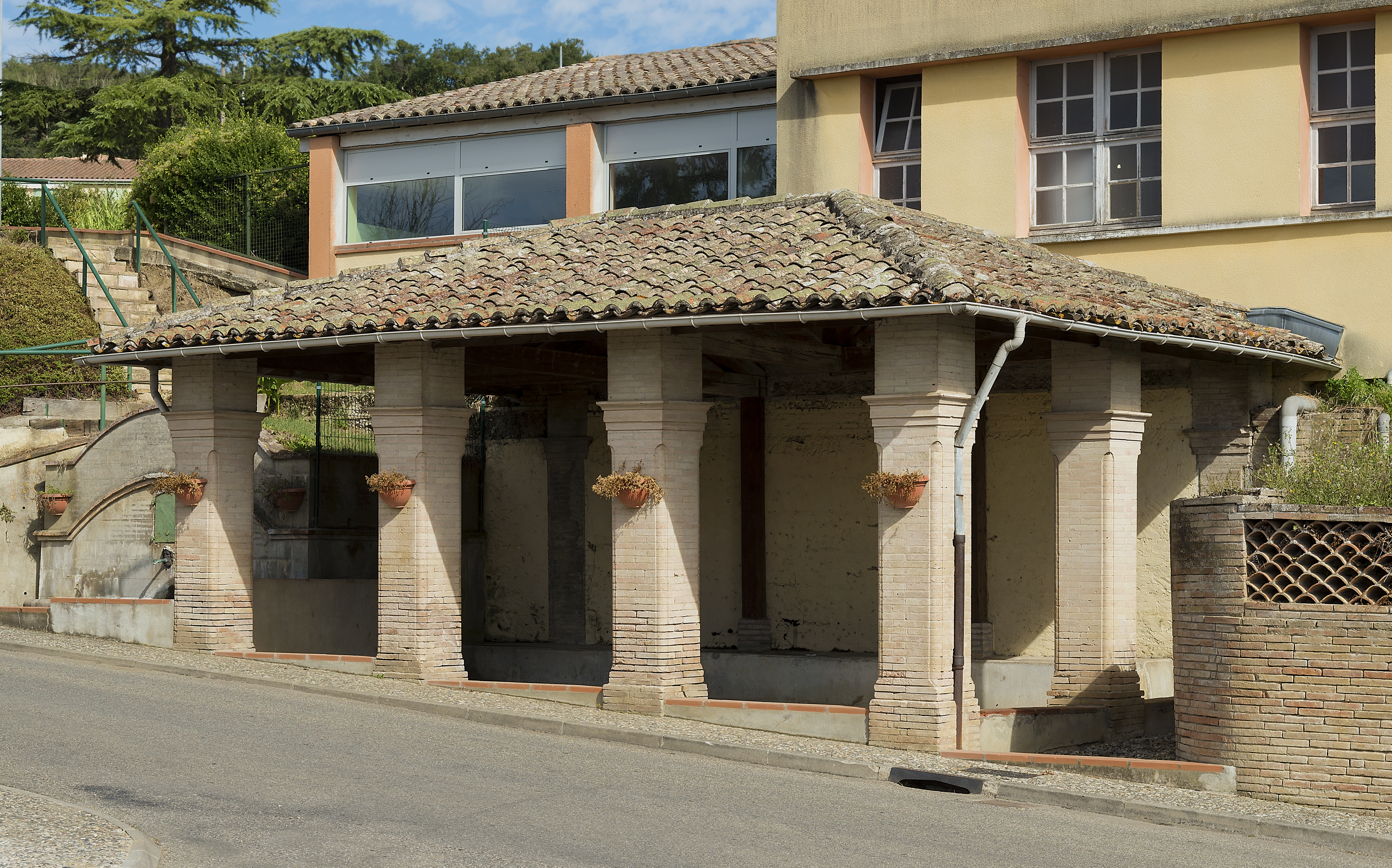
The laundry.

== Heraldry ==
Pompignan	Azure, a knight brandishing a sword, mounted on a galloping horse, all argent.

== Proposed new rail route beside village ==
As of January 2011, a decision to route the proposed new TGV line from Bordeaux to Toulouse at the edge of the village and through the grounds of the chateau is being publicly debated. While the building itself and its entrance lodge have been listed as a historic monument since 1951, and classified as such since 1972, the protection does not extend directly to the remainder of the park or its contents.

Some of the villages along the proposed line have formed an association, Unions pour la Sauvegarde des Villages (USV in documents. ~ Associations for Saving the Villages) to promote an alternative route. This would leave the existing line near St Jory, about 10 km (6.2 mi) south of the point it is now due to make the eastward turn and 100 m (330 ft) climb from the valley floor to the plateau above, and rejoin the proposed route just after Pompignan, but above it and out of sight.

On 28 September 2010 a directive (in French) was issued by minister Jean-Louis Borloo, in political charge of the project. In relation to the sector containing Pompignan, and in response to representations made by local communities, three alternative routes were examined and compared with the route (through the chateau's park) originally proposed, which is still considered on balance the most favourable.

However, the proposals advocated by USV, essentially running the tracks close to the existing A62 motorway (which mounts the scarp at a shallower angle some 10 km (6.2 mi) south of Pompignan), merit study in more depth before a decision can be made. These two options will therefore be studied and compared in detail, the results to be available by the beginning of next year (2011), and with a view to seeing whether the proposals of the communities can be accommodated.

== See also ==
- Communes of the Tarn-et-Garonne department
- Mairie:
