= Peirae =

Peirae or Peirai (Ancient Greek: Πειραί) was a village of ancient Achaea in the neighbourhood of Olenus, and one of the places to which the inhabitants of Olenus fled upon leaving their city.
