= Jean-Jacques Lefranc, Marquis de Pompignan =

French man of letters and erudition (1709–1784)

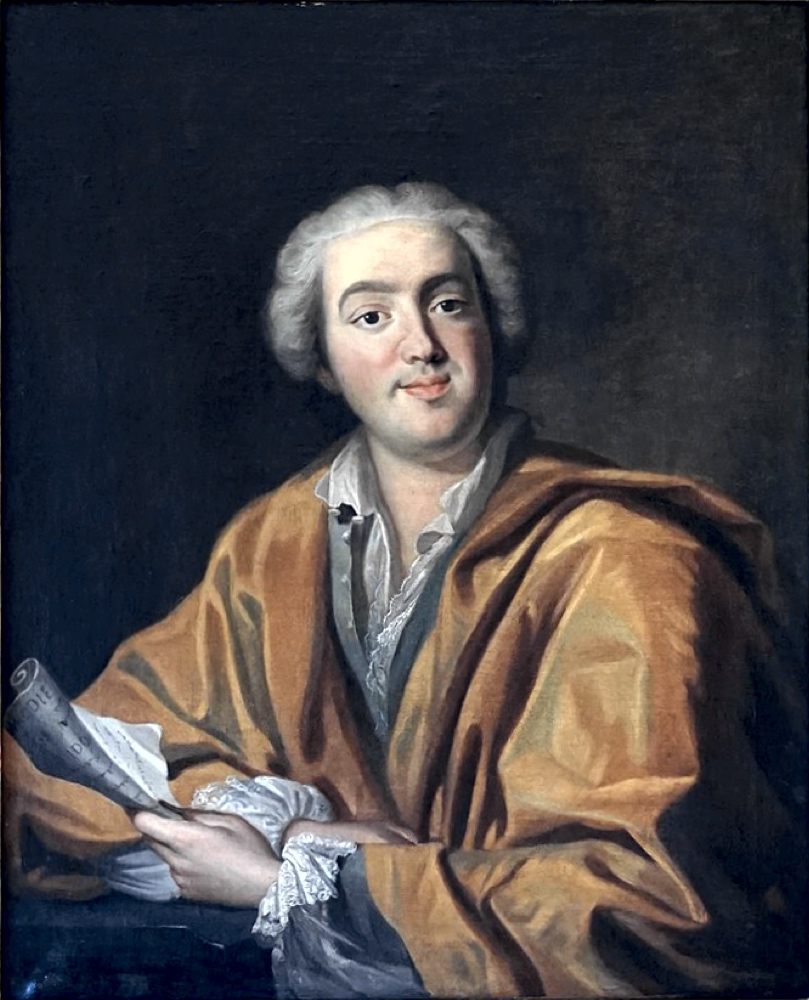
Jean-Jacques Lefranc, Marquis de Pompignan

Jean-Jacques Lefranc (also Le Franc), Marquis de Pompignan (10 August 1709 – 1 November 1784) was a French man of letters and erudition, who published a considerable output of theatrical work, poems, literary criticism, and polemics; treatises on archeology, nature, travel and many other subjects; and a wide selection of highly regarded translations of the classics and other works from several European languages including English.

His life and career, as well as his literary and other works are noteworthy today because of their location at the very center of the French Enlightenment; and although some of the positions he took are also considered to have been formative contributions to the counter-Enlightenment tendencies that were being articulated in parallel, he remains, in many respects, the typical Enlightenment man.

The prolific volumes of literary works are now of academic interest only, mainly to flesh out aspects of the culture of the time, which embraced a period in which tensions that were to explode in the French Revolution five years after his death were still held in check. Lefranc is remembered today, if he is at all, as a consequence of the maiden speech he gave at the Académie française in 1760, which led to him becoming forever known and defined as "the enemy of Voltaire".

His library of some 25,000 volumes was sold after his death by his son, and became founding collections for no less than three learned institutions in Toulouse. He built a neo-classical chateau at Pompignan, and over a period of thirty-five years created one of the earliest and most extensive parcs à fabriques (or French landscape garden).

The chateau stands in good order today, and although the park and its follies have been neglected, the extensive hydrological system still functions. In May 2011 the decision was taken to route the planned Bordeaux-Toulouse TGV and high-speed freight rail lines through the center of Lefranc's landscape park.

== Biography ==
The Lefranc family were originally landlords of the Château de Cayx (or see Château de Caïx on French Wiki, which gives more detail), overlooking a bend on the Lot some 12 km northwest of Cahors. Successive Lefrancs had served since 1640 as hereditary presidents of the regional Cours des Aides, which was located in Cahors. When Louis XIV ordered the court to be moved to Montauban (some 60 km south of Cahors over difficult roads), during the presidency of Jacques Lefranc in the early years of the 18th century, the family built a town house in Montauban as their local residence. It still stands impressively today at 10 rue Armand Cambon (there is a Place Lefranc de Pompignan nearby). At the same time, lands were purchased at Pompignan (some 20 km to the southwest of Montauban) to provide a convenient rural retreat.

Jean-Jacques' father, Jacques Lefranc, was the third of the name to become president of the Cour des Aides, and he was to be followed by his eldest son and grandson. The family retained the seat at Cayx, and the beautifully sited old chateau was where Jean-Jacques and his brother were reared; as a young man he styled himself Lefranc de Caix. His mother, born Mademoiselle de Caulet, was of the same milieu, her father serving as a "president of the morter" - a judicial rank - at the Parlement de Toulouse, where Jean-Jacques was also to have a brief tenure.

His education was entrusted to " ... the most skillful masters at the Capital, where he found himself among the disciples of the celebrated Pere Poré. The student made rapid progress, and was not slow in showing proof of a talent as rare as it was precocious. After successfully completing his classical studies [at the Collège de Louis-le-Grand], he remained in Paris to attend the School of Law." Voltaire, fifteen years older than Lefranc, attended this school from 1704 to 1711, and was also influenced by Pere Poré.

He joined the staff of the Cours des Aides in 1730, during the presidency of his uncle, the abbé Louis Lefranc, who had succeeded his brother, Jean-Jacques' father Jacques, on the death of the latter in 1719. When Louis died in 1745, Jean-Jacques, who had by then served for fifteen years as a general advocate at the court, although expected to succeed him in turn, was not yet old enough to be awarded the position, and had to wait until early 1747 to take over its presidency.

The same year he was also appointed conseiller d'honneur of the Toulouse parlement, but his opposition to the abuses of the royal power, especially in the matter of taxation, brought him so much trouble that he resigned almost immediately.

== Early works ==
His first play, Didon (1734), which owed much to Metastasio's opera on the same subject, was a great success, and gave rise to expectations not fulfilled by the Adieux de Mars (1735) and some light operas that followed.

His reputation was made by Poésies sacrées et philosophiques (1734), later mocked by Voltaire, who punned on the title: "Sacrés ils sont, car personne n'y touche" ("They are sacred all right, because no one will touch them"). Lefranc's odes on profane (or worldly) subjects hardly reach the same level of quality, with the exception of his ode on the death of JB Rousseau, which achieved considerable renown.

== The Academie and the war with Voltaire ==
His marriage with a wealthy widow enabled him to devote himself fully to literature, and also funded his campaign for a seat in the Académie française, which was achieved in 1759.

However, on his formal induction into the Academie in 1760, he made an ill-considered speech violently attacking the Encyclopaedists, many of whom were in his audience and had voted for him.

Lefranc soon had reason to repent of his action, for the epigrams and stories circulated by those he had attacked made it difficult for him to remain in Paris, and he returned to his native town, where he spent the rest of his life gardening, writing poetry and translating from the classics.

Jean-François de la Harpe, who is severe enough on Lefranc in his correspondence, does his abilities full justice in his Cours littéraire, and ranks him next to JB Rousseau among French lyric poets. With those of other 18th-century poets his works may be studied in the Petits poètes français (1838) of Prosper Poitevin. His Œuvres complètes (5 vols.) were published in 1781, selections (2 vols.) in 1800, 1813, 1822.

== The chateau and its "parc a fabriques" ==
Beginning in 1745, Lefranc rebuilt the manor house at Pompignan as the present neoclassical Chateau de Pompignan, and over a period of thirty-five years created a very extensive landscape garden, containing many follies, or architectural constructions to enhance the natural and created landscape. These included ruined temples, a gothic bridge, pleasure houses, and an extensive hydraulic and reservoir system which managed a lake and fishpond, streams, fountains and the water for the house.

== Family ==
Jean-Jaques' younger brother, Jean Georges Lefranc de Pompignan, rose through the hierarchy to become Archbishop of Vienne and a favourite of the king, whose eulogy he delivered.

Pompignan was also the alleged biological father of the French suffragist and playwright Olympe de Gouges (1748–1793).

== Works ==
- 1734: Didon (1734), tragedy created at the Comédie-Française 21 June
- 1735: Les Adieux de Mars (1735), comedy in free verse created at the Comédie Italienne by the comédiens ordinaires du roi 30 June
- 1737: Le Triomphe de l’harmonie, ballet héroïque created at the Académie royale de musique 9 May
- 1740: La Prière universelle, translated from the English of M. Pope
- 1745: Voyage de Languedoc et de Provence
- 1746: De Antiquitatibus Cadurcorum ad Academiam Cortonensem epistola
- 1748: Amphion (1748), acte de ballet created at the Académie royale de musique 26 December
- 1759: Léandre et Héro, tragédie lyrique created at the Académie royale de musique le 21 April
- 1751–1754: Poésies sacrées
- 1758: Dissertation sur les biens nobles
- 1760: Réponses aux ″quand″, aux ″si″, et aux ″pourquoi″
- 1761: Éloge historique de Mgr le duc de Bourgogne
- 1770: Tragédies d’Eschyle
- 1771: Discours philosophiques tirés des livres saints, avec des odes chrétiennes et philosophiques
- 1779: Mélange de traductions de différents ouvrages grecs, latins et anglois sur des matières de politique, de littérature et d’histoire
- Œuvres, édition de 1784
