= Cultural influence of Metamorphoses =

Metamorphoses (Transformations) is a Latin narrative poem by the Roman poet Ovid, considered his magnum opus. Comprising fifteen books and over 250 myths, the poem chronicles the history of the world from its creation to the deification of Julius Caesar within a loose mythico-historical framework. Although meeting the criteria for an epic, the poem defies simple genre classification by its use of varying themes and tones.

Considered one of the most influential works of art in Western culture, particularly European, Metamorphoses has inspired such authors as Geoffrey Chaucer, William Shakespeare, Dante Alighieri and Giovanni Boccaccio. Numerous episodes from the poem have been depicted in sculptures and paintings by artists such as Titian. Although Ovid's reputation faded after the Renaissance, towards the end of the twentieth century there was a resurgence of interest in his work; today, Metamorphoses continues to inspire and be retold through various media.

== Films ==
- Metamorphoses, 1978
- Venus and the Sun, 2011
- Métamorphoses, 2014

== Plays ==
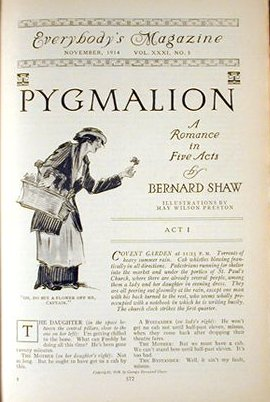
First American serialized printing of Bernard Shaw's Pygmalion (November 1914).

- The myth of Pygmalion and Galatea (Book X) has been adapted into plays by Jean-Jacques Rousseau (Pygmalion, 1762), W. S. Gilbert (Pygmalion and Galatea, an Original Mythological Comedy, 1871) and George Bernard Shaw (Pygmalion, premiered October 1913). Gilbert's play was parodied in the musical burlesque Galatea, or Pygmalion Reversed (1883) Shaw's play—in which phonetics professor Henry Higgins makes a bet that he can train a Cockney flower girl to pass for a duchess by improving her speech—was adapted by Shaw himself into a film version (Pygmalion, 1938), the screenplay of which was later adapted into the Lerner and Loewe musical My Fair Lady (1956), itself adapted into a 1964 musical film. More recent examples include the film Pretty Woman (1990), wherein Julia Roberts plays a sex worker who goes through a similar transformation so that she can take the place of her client's girlfriend after a sudden breakup.
- In 2002, author Mary Zimmerman adapted some of Ovid's myths into a play by the same title, and the open-air-theatre group London Bubble also adapted it in 2006.
- Naomi Iizuka's Polaroid Stories bases its format on Metamorphoses, adapting Ovid's poem to modern times with drug-addicted, teenage versions of many of the characters from the original play.
- In 2010, the Yvonne Arnaud Theatre presented a new adaptation of Metamorphoses at the Edinburgh Festival Fringe.

== Literature ==
- In 1613, Spanish poet Luis de Góngora wrote an illustrious poem titled La Fábula de Polifemo y Galatea that retells the story of Polyphemus, Galatea and Acis found in Book XIII of the Metamorphoses.
- In 1988, author Christoph Ransmayr reworked a great number of characters from the Metamorphoses in his The Last World.
- In 1997, the British poet laureate Ted Hughes adapted twenty-four stories from the Metamorphoses into his volume of poetry Tales from Ovid. This was later adapted for the stage in Stratford-upon-Avon in 1999, the year after Hughes's death.
- In 2000, author Phillip Terry edited a collection of modern adaptations of some of Ovid's myths as Ovid Metamorphosed. Contributors included Margaret Atwood.
- In 2009, British author Adrian Mitchell wrote a collection entitled Shapeshifters: Tales from Ovid's Metamorphoses, intended for young adult readers. This is one of Mitchell's last books, as he died in 2008, and it was published posthumously.
- Australian writer Ursula Dubosarsky adapted ten of the stories from the Metamorphoses into plays for children. These were first published in the School Magazine, a publication of the New South Wales Department of Education, from 2006.
- Published in 2018, The Overstory by Richard Powers makes frequent allusion to the Metamorphoses. It contains recurring quotations of the line from a children's translation of Metamorphoses: "Let me sing to you now, about how people turn into other things."

== Paintings ==
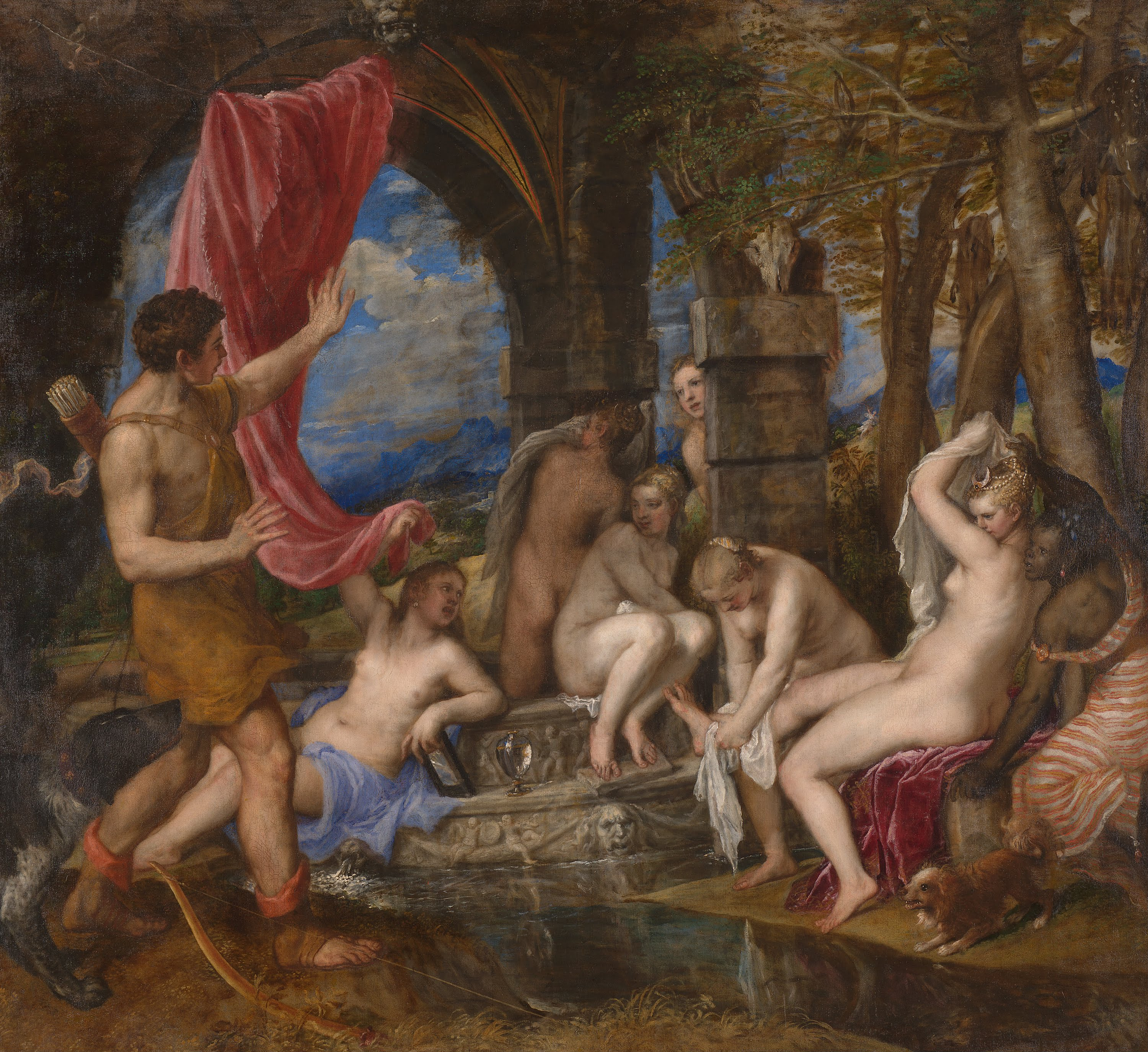
Diana and Actaeon, Titian, 1556–1559 (National Gallery, London).

- Bacchus and Ariadne (1522–23), an oil painting by Titian produced for Alfonso I d'Este, Duke of Ferrara, depicts the story of Ariadne and Bacchus described in Book VIII. During his later years (1550–1576), Titian painted a series of large mythological paintings known as the "poesie" for Philip II of Spain. The "poesie" series, which depicts scenes from Ovid, contained the following works: Venus and Adonis (Book X), Danaë (Book IV), Diana and Actaeon (Book III), Diana and Callisto, Perseus and Andromeda (Book IV), The Rape of Europa (Book II), and The Death of Actaeon (Book III). Titian's last finished work, The Flaying of Marsyas (c. 1570–1576), depicts the punishment of the satyr Marsyas (Book VI).
- Las Hilanderas ("The Spinners"), a painting from the 1650s by Diego Velázquez housed in the Museo del Prado, is influenced by Ovid's story of Arachne (Book VI). In the Velázquez painting, the tapestry Arachne is weaving is a copy of Titian's The Rape of Europa (ca. 1560–1562).
- Jupiter and Semele (1894–95), a painting by the French Symbolist artist Gustave Moreau, depicts the myth of the mortal woman Semele, mother of Bacchus, and her lover, Jupiter (Book III).
- The painting Echo and Narcissus (1903), by the English Pre-Raphaelite painter John William Waterhouse, depicts the myth of Echo and Narcissus described in Book III.

== Music ==
- Acis and Galatea (1718/1732), a masque by Handel, is based on the eponymous characters out of the Metamorphoses, as is Lully's 1686 opera Acis et Galatée.
- In 1743, Handel composed Semele. Based on a pre-existent libretto by William Congreve, the story of this Baroque oratorio comes from the episode of Semele and the birth of Bacchus from Book III.
- In 1746, French composer Jean-Marie Leclair wrote an opera (tragédie en musique) Scylla et Glaucus based on the books 10, 13 and 14.
- In 1767, 11-year-old Wolfgang Amadeus Mozart composed his first opera, Apollo et Hyacinthus, K. 38. The opera is based on the myth of Apollo and Hyacinth as told in book X of the Metamorphoses.
- In 1783, Austrian composer Carl Ditters von Dittersdorf wrote twelve symphonies on selected stories of the Metamorphoses; only six survive, corresponding to stories from the first six books.
- Ruben Dario's Collection of poems, Prosas Profanas (1896) contains the poem "Coloquio de los Centauros" based upon Ovid's Metamorphoses.
- In 1951, British composer Benjamin Britten wrote Six Metamorphoses after Ovid for solo oboe incorporating six of Ovid's mythical characters.
- Jazz artist Patricia Barber's 2006 album, Mythologies, is a set of songs based on Ovid's Metamorphoses.

== Other ==
- The marble sculpture The Rape of Proserpina (1621–22) by Baroque sculptor Gian Lorenzo Bernini depicts the abduction of Proserpina by Pluto, ruler of the underworld (treated by Ovid in Book V). In 1625, Bernini finished his sculpture Apollo and Daphne, which depicts the metamorphosis of the nymph Daphne as she flees from Apollo after he was pierced by Cupid's love-inducing arrow (Book I). This episode furthermore has been treated repeatedly in opera, notably by Jacopo Peri (Dafne) in 1597, Handel's (lost) Daphne in 1708, and Richard Strauss (Daphne, with a libretto that deviates significantly from Ovid's account) in 1938.
- Pablo Picasso illustrated the Metamorphoses in 30 etchings, published in 1931 as Les Métamorphoses. The etchings include depictions of the death of Orpheus, the struggle between Tereus and Philomela, and Minyas' daughters.

== See also ==
- After Ovid: New Metamorphoses
- Latin literature
- List of characters in Metamorphoses
- Ovid Prize
- Six Metamorphoses after Ovid
