= Venus and the Sun =

2011 short film

- Theatrical release poster
- Directed by: Adam Randall
- Written by: Reuben Grove
- Produced by: Andy Brunskill
- Starring: Keeley Hazell; Will Smith; Ukweili Roach
- Cinematography: Trevor Forrest
- Edited by: Paul Monaghan
- Music by: Stephen Warbeck
- Release date: 10 March 2011
- Running time: 23 minutes
- Country: United Kingdom
- Language: English

Venus and the Sun is a 2011 short film based on myths from Ovid's Metamorphoses directed by Adam Randall and starring Keeley Hazell, Will Smith, and Ukweili Roach. It was written by Reuben Grove and produced by Andy Brunskill.

The film premieres in London on 10 March 2011 at the Rich Mix Cinema, Shoreditch

== Cast ==
- Keeley Hazell as herself/Venus
- Will Smith as Simon
- Ukweli Roach as Adam

== iPhone app ==
A free app for the film is currently available to download from the App store containing mini games and the trailer. Users will then be able to pay for the full version which contains the film on the day of release.

== See also ==
- Cultural influence of Metamorphoses
