= After Ovid: New Metamorphoses =

Collection of poems

After Ovid: New Metamorphoses is a collection of poems inspired by Ovid's Metamorphoses.

Michael Hofmann and James Lasdun, the two editors of After Ovid: New Metamorphoses, commissioned 42 poets from America, Australia, Great Britain, Ireland, and New Zealand to "translate, reinterpret, reflect on, or completely reimagine" Ovid's famous Metamorphoses. The poets include Alice Fulton, C.K. Williams, Mark Rudman, Seamus Heaney and Ted Hughes.

== See also ==
- Cultural influence of Metamorphoses
- List of characters in Metamorphoses
