= Lasdun =

Lasdun is a surname. Notable people with the surname include:

- Denys Lasdun (1914–2001), English architect
- James Lasdun (born 1958), English novelist and poet, son of Denys
