= Metamorphoses (1978 film) =

1978 Japanese-American animated film

Winds of Change
- Directed by: Takashi Masunaga
- Written by: Ovid; Takashi Masunaga
- Produced by: Terry Ogisu; Takashi Masunaga; Hiro Tsugawa
- Starring: Peter Ustinov narrator (US version)
- Music by: Alec R. Costandinos; Billy Goldenberg; Robert Randles
- Production company: Sanrio Films
- Distributed by: Sanrio
- Release dates: May 26, 1978 (United States); October 27, 1979 (Japan)
- Running time: 89 minutes (original); 82 minutes (reissue)
- Countries: Japan; United States
- Languages: English; Japanese

Metamorphoses (Japanese: 星のオルフェウス, Hepburn: Hoshi no Orufeusu; "Orpheus of the Stars") is a 1978 animated anthology film that premiered in Albuquerque, New Mexico on May 26, 1978. It was released by Sanrio in the United States on May 3, 1979. It is a retelling of stories from Metamorphoses by the Roman poet Ovid, and narration by Peter Ustinov. In all of its five parts, the protagonists are portrayed in the form of a recurring boy and girl.

== Production ==
The film was the between American golden age of Disney-influenced anime and Sanrio's second animated release in the US (following their adaptation of The Mouse and His Child the previous year). Over 170 animators, all employed in Hollywood, worked on it for three years.

== Release ==
Metamorphoses tried to be the rock era's answer to Fantasia, but its original run was critically reviled and closed as soon as it opened. According to many of its crew, many problems with the production, music and plotting were to blame.

On May 3, 1979, it was reissued under a new title, Winds of Change, with seven minutes trimmed from the first cut of 89 minutes. This time, the music was composed by Alec R. Costandinos, the disco songs were sung by Arthur Simms and Pattie Brooks and narration by Peter Ustinov was added.

The five parts:

1. "Actaeon"
2. "Orpheus and Eurydice"
3. "The House of Envy"
4. "Perseus" and...
5. "Phaëton"

...in the original order, were re-arranged and slightly renamed for the new version; the third and last parts remained unmoved. In the Winds cut, the first two were now "Perseus" and "Actaeon", and the fourth "Orpheus".

In addition, the boy was now called Wondermaker, and the girl played different characters in every segment. Greek gods Hermes, Artemis and Hades were given their Roman names (Mercury, Diana and Pluto respectively).

== See also ==
- Cultural influence of Metamorphoses
- List of animated feature-length films

== Sources ==
- Beck, Jerry (2005), pp. 166–7. The Animated Movie Guide. ISBN 1-55652-591-5. Chicago Reader Press. Accessed April 9, 2007.
