= Macaria =

Name in Greek mythology

Macaria or Makaria (Ancient Greek: Μακαρία, romanized: Makaría, lit. 'blessed one, blessedness') is the name of two figures from ancient Greek religion and mythology:

- Macaria, daughter of Heracles and Deianira who willingly accepted to be sacrificed in order to save her people.
- Macaria, daughter of Hades, king of the Underworld.

== Bibliography ==
- Euripides, Children of Heracles in Euripides, with an English translation by David Kovacs. Cambridge. Harvard University Press. Online text available at Perseus Digital Library.
- Liddell, Henry George; Scott, Robert (1940). Sir Henry Stuart Jones; Roderick McKenzie (eds.). A Greek-English Lexicon. Oxford: Clarendon Press.
