= Pyreneus =

In Greek mythology, Pyreneus was a king of Thrace.

== Mythology ==
In Ovid's Metamorphoses, Pyreneus invites the Muses to take shelter in his palace while he secretly means to do them harm. Once the Muses are inside, he tries to trap them, but they fly away. He tries to follow them by leaping off a tower, but only falls to his death.
