= Château de Cayx =

Danish Royal Family residence in France

Coordinates: 44°29′26″N 1°18′20″E

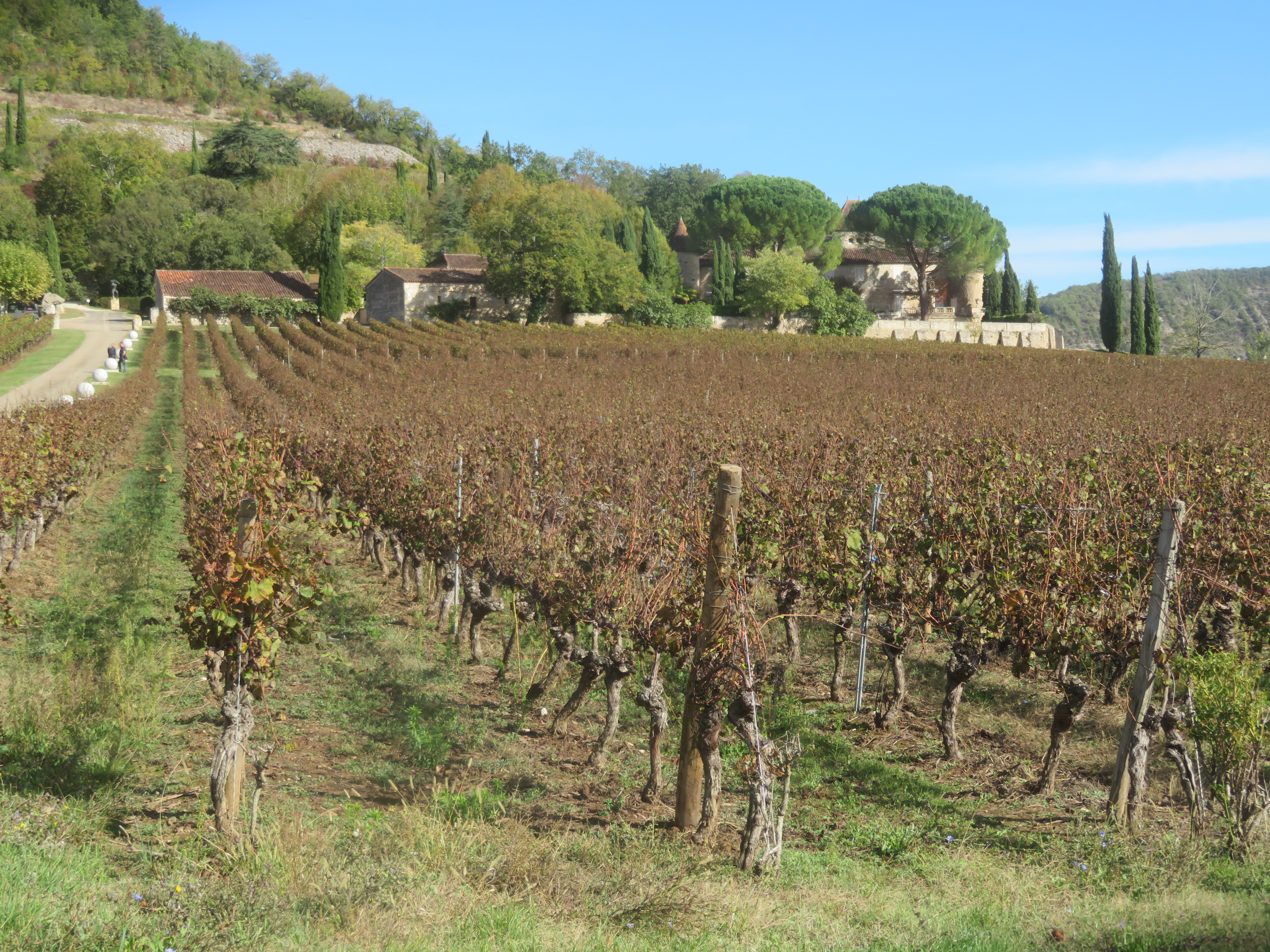
Château de Caïx with a vineyard

The Château de Caïx is a summer residence of the Danish royal family located in the wine district of Cahors in southern France. In medieval times the castle formed part of the defences of the town of Luzech due to its dominance of the river Lot.

== History ==
In the 15th century the chateau belonged to the Couderc family, who were notaries in Luzech, and in the 16th century the Courtois family held the lordship. With his marriage to Hélène de Courtois in 1640, Gerard Lefranc became lord of the domain. He was the first hereditary president of the Cours des Aides in nearby Cahors. His grandson, Jacques Lefranc, was president when the court was moved to Montauban in 1709, when he bought a property at Pompignan.

Jacques' eldest son, the noted French poet Jean-Jacques Lefranc, Marquis de Pompignan spent the first half of his life at Cayx and received some of the inspiration for his garden at the Château de Pompignan from the siting and views (though not the architecture, by then outmoded) of Cayx. Jacques' second son, Jean-Georges, bishop of Vienne and also an Enlightenment figure was raised there as well. The sale of Cayx may have funded some of the building works at Pompignan, which itself was sold by Jean-Jacques' grandson in 1833.

The château was first fortified during the fourteenth century. Since then it has been rebuilt and renovated several times. The Lefrancs built the extensive wine cellars under the château.

The Danish royal family purchased the château and the estate in 1974. Since then they have renovated it extensively. According to the official website of the Danish monarchy, the residence has become a "relaxed setting for reunions of the entire Danish Royal Family and their French relatives". It has been the setting for holiday photocalls for the Danish Royal Family, including for Prince Henrik's 80th birthday.

The residence is not open to the public. A guided tour of the gardens is available during the summer. The château still produces wine.

== Gallery ==
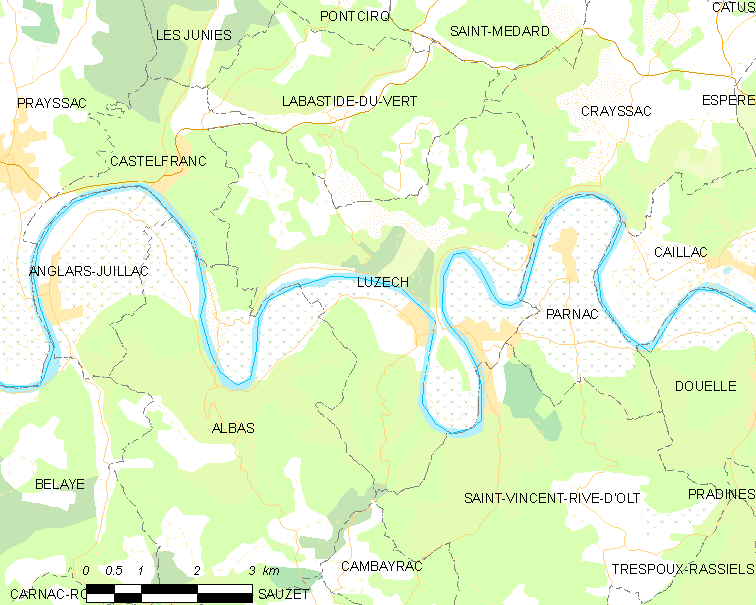
River Lot where the Château de Cayx is located

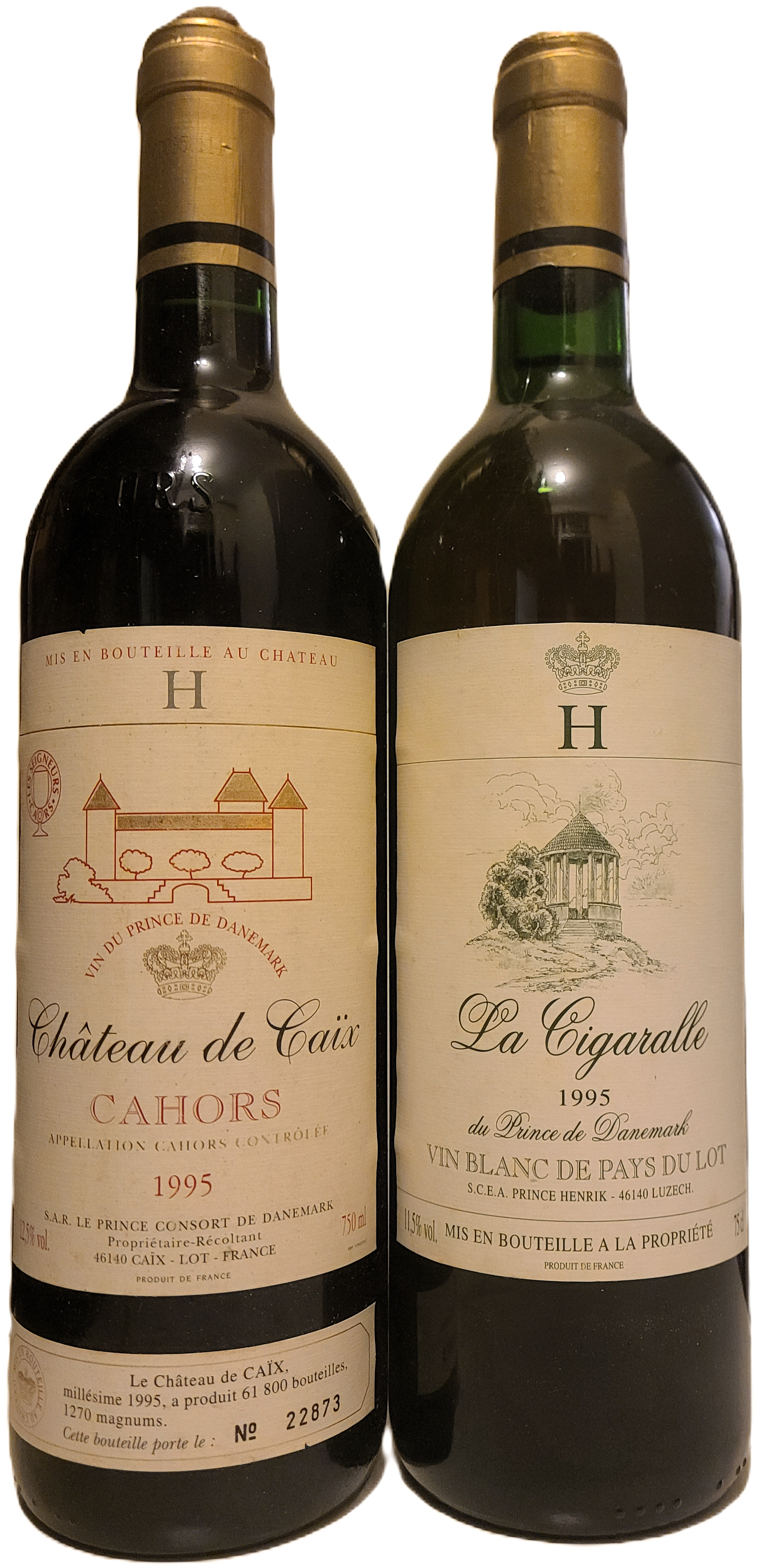
Chateau de Caix Cahors 1995, Château de Cayx Chardonnay La Cigarelle Prince de Danemark 1995

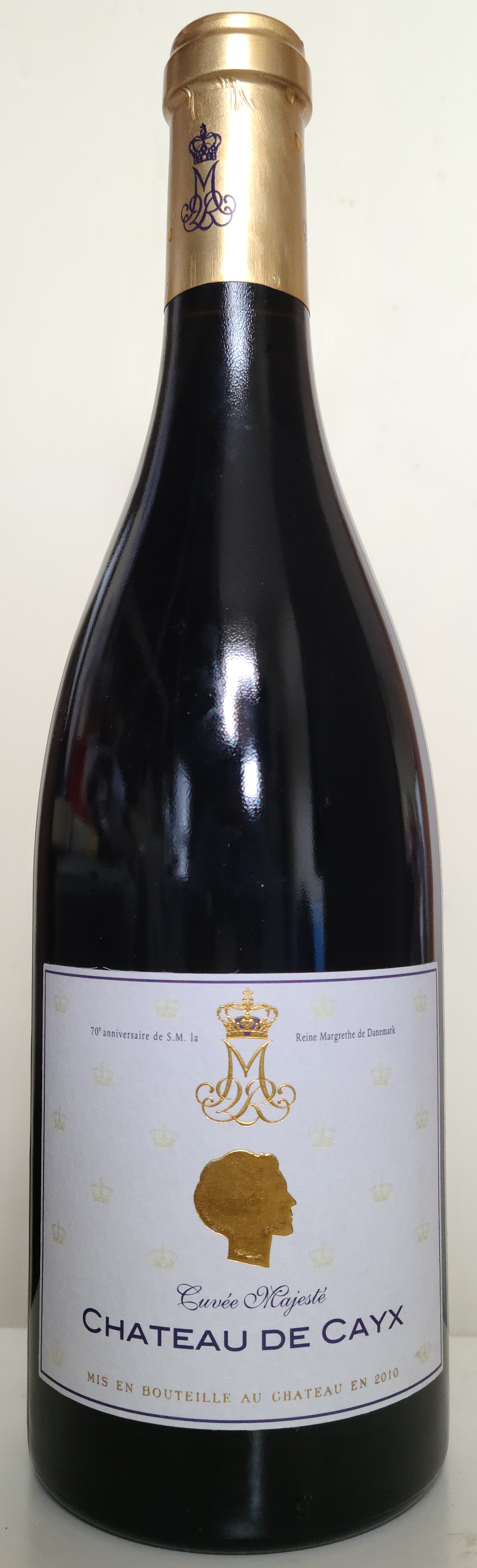
Cuvée Majesté 2008
