= Macareae =

Town of ancient Arcadia

Coordinates: 37°24′18″N 22°04′34″E

Macareae or Makareai (Ancient Greek: Μακαρέαι), also known as Macaria or Makaria (Μακαρία), was a town of ancient Arcadia, in the district Parrhasia, 22 stadia from Megalopolis, on the road to Phigaleia, and 2 stadia from the Alpheius. It was in ruins in the time of Pausanias (2nd century), as its inhabitants had been removed to Megalopolis upon the foundation of the latter (371 BCE). According to Greek mythology, it was founded by Macareus, a son of Lycaon.

Its site is located near the modern Alfeios.
