= Olenus (Galatia) =

Olenus or Olenos (Ancient Greek: Ὤλενος) was a town of ancient Galatia, in the west of Ancyra, and belonging to the territory of the Tectosages, is mentioned only by Ptolemy.
