= Lethaea =

Greek mythical character, wife of Olenus

Illustration of Lethea and Olenus by Johann Ulrich Krauss

Lethaea (Ancient Greek: Ληθαία, romanized: Lethaía) is a mythological character briefly mentioned in Ovid's Metamorphoses.

== Mythology ==
Due to her vanity, Lethaea was turned into stone at Ida by the gods. Her lover Olenus wished to share in the blame, and so shared her fate. The story is used as a metaphor for how stunned Orpheus was after a failed attempt to bring back his wife from the underworld. It was as if he too were turned to stone.
