= Cyllarus =

Centaur

Cyllarus (Ancient Greek: Κύλλαρος) was a centaur in Roman mythology.

== Mythology ==
The below is mentioned in Ovid's Metamorphoses,

...His beard was beginning to show; a beard the colour of gold; and a golden mane fell from his shoulders half way down his flanks. He had a liveliness of expression that was pleasing; his neck and shoulders, chest and hands, and all his human parts, you would praise as almost sculpted by an artist. Nor was the equine part below marred, or inferior to the human: give him a horse’s head and neck and he would be worthy of a Castor, the back so fit for a rider, the deep chest so muscular. He was blacker than pitch all over, except for a white tail, and legs also snow-white.

— Ovid, The Metamorphoses, Book 12 (12.393)

He was handsome and valiant, and dearly loved his centaur wife Hylonome. He participated in the battle against the Lapiths and was fatally wounded by a spear. His assailant was unknown. He died in the arms of his beloved wife, who then joined him by impaling herself on the same spear.

== See also ==
- List of Greek deities
