= Olenus (Achaea) =

Ancient city in Achaea, Greece

Coordinates: 38°09′13″N 21°38′26″E

Map of ancient Achaea (with place names in Greek)

Olenus (Ancient Greek: Ὤλενος, romanized: Olenos) or Olenum was a polis (city-state) in ancient Achaea, Greece. It was an original member of the Achaean League, one of the 12 Achaean cities, situated on the coast, and on the left bank of the river Peirus, 40 stadia from Dyme, and 80 stadia from Patrae. On the revival of the Achaean League in 280 BCE, it appears that Olenus was still in existence, as Strabo says that it did not join the league; but the inhabitants subsequently abandoned the town, and retired to the neighbouring villages of Peirae (Πειραί), and Euryteiae (Εὐρυτειαί), and to Dyme. In the time of Polybius, however, Olenus was no longer inhabited; and in the time of Pausanias (2nd century) it was in ruins, and its territory belonged to Dyme.

Its site is located near the modern Tsoukalaiika/Kamenitsa.

== Rulers ==
- Olenus, eponymous first ruler of Olenus.
- Crinacus, second king of Olenus (according to Diodorus Siculus)
