= Helicon (river) =

River in Dion-Olympos municipality, Greece

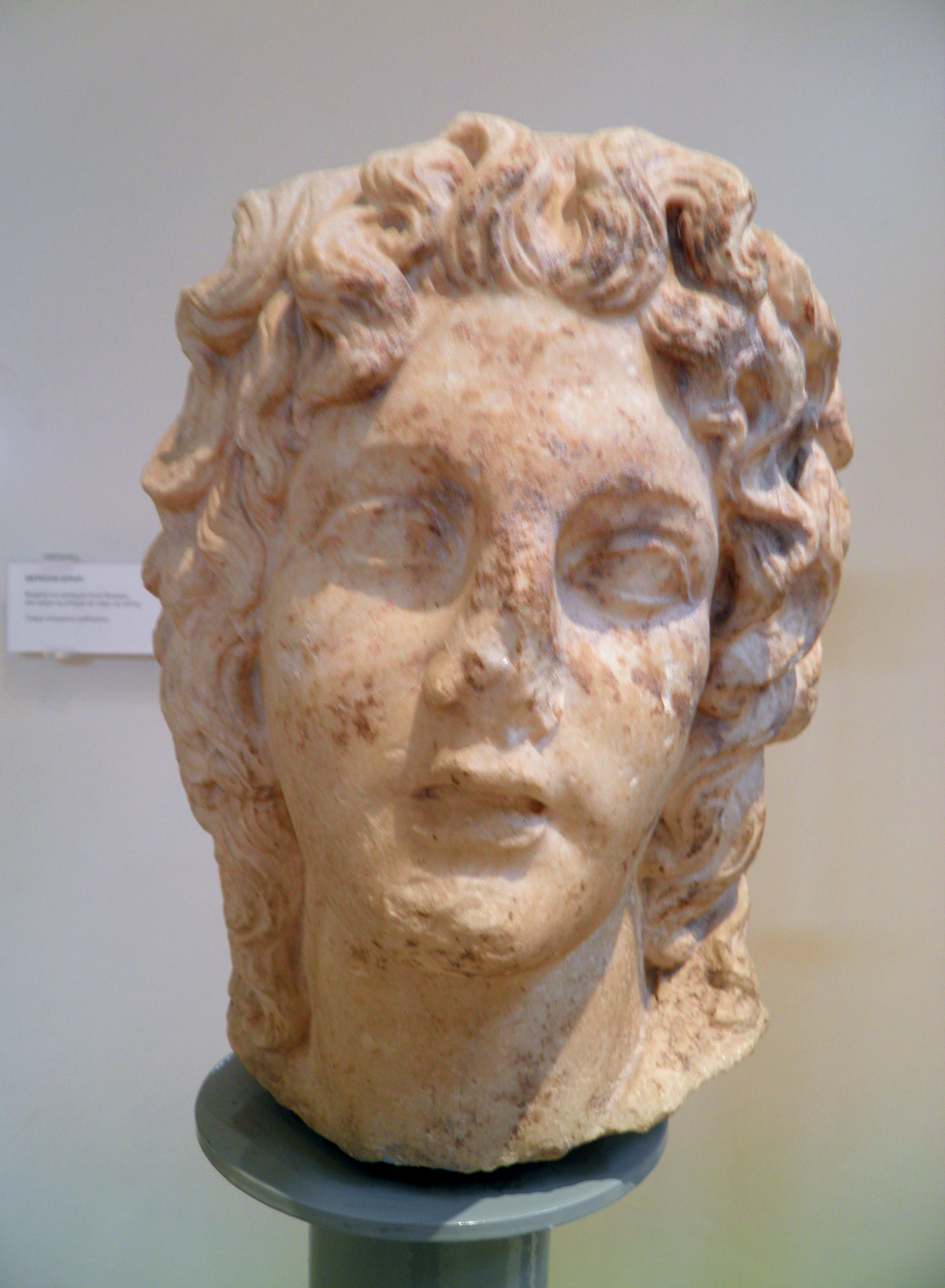
Marble bust of the river-god in the Dion Archaeological Museum, Greece.

Helicon (also transliterated Helikon), also called Baphyras, was a river attested in antiquity, which existed near the Macedonian city of Dion in Pieria. Pausanias describes it as vanishing underground and resurfacing under a different name, and relates an Orphic tradition that the river sank after the maenads who had killed Orpheus tried to cleanse themselves of blood (and the ritual pollution of murder) in its waters.

== Mythology ==
The river-god was submerged after the murder of Orpheus. In Pausanias' words:

There is also a river called Helikon [in Pieria]. After a course of seventy-five stades the stream hereupon disappears under the earth. After a gap of about twenty-two stades the water rises again, and under the name of Baphyras instead of Helikon flows into the sea as a navigable river. The people of Dion (Dium) say that at first this River flowed on land throughout its course. But, they go on to say, the women who killed Orpheus wished to wash off in it the blood-stains, and thereat the River sank underground, so as not to lend its waters to cleanse manslaughter.

— Pausanias, Description of Greece 9. 30. 8 (trans. W.H.S. Jones and H.A. Ormerod) (Greek travelogue c. 2nd A.D.)

== Bibliography ==
- Pausanias, Description of Greece with an English Translation, trans. W.H.S. Jones, and H.A. Ormerod, (Cambridge: MA, Harvard University Press; London: William Heinemann Ltd., 1918).
