= Olenus =

Set of mythological Greek characters

In Greek mythology and Roman mythology, Olenus (/ˈɒlɪnəs/;Ancient Greek: Ὤλενος, romanized: Ōlenos) was the name of several individuals:

- Olenus, son of Vulcan and father of Helice and Aex, two nurses of infant Jove. A city in Aulis was named for him.
- Olenus, son of Zeus and Anaxithea (or Hippodamia), daughter of Danaus. He was the eponymous ruler of the city Olenus in Achaea. Olenus was succeeded by Crinacus, another bastard son of Zeus.
- Olenus, father of Tectaphus, a Lapith.
- Olenus, a man who lived on Mount Ida. His wife Lethaea claimed she was more beautiful than any goddess. They were both turned to stone; although Olenus could have avoided this fate, he chose to be with his wife.
- Olenus, a Lelegian, father of Phoceus. His son was killed by the Argonauts.
