= Macar =

Various characters in Greek mythology

In Greek mythology, Macar (/ˈmeɪkər/; Ancient Greek: Μάκαρ, lit. 'happy, blissful') or Macareus (/məˈkæriəs, -ˈkɑːrjuːs/; Μακαρεύς) or Macareas (Μακαρέας), is the name of several individuals:

- Macareus, an Arcadian prince as one of the 50 sons of the impious King Lycaon either by the naiad Cyllene, Nonacris or by unknown woman. He was the eponym of the town of Macaria in Arcadia. Macareus and his siblings were the most nefarious and carefree of all people. To test them, Zeus visited them in the form of a peasant. These brothers mixed the entrails of a child into the god's meal, whereupon the enraged king of the gods threw the meal over the table. Macareus was killed, along with his brothers and their father, by a lightning bolt of the god.
- Macareus, son of Aeolus and either Enarete or Amphithea.
- Macareus, a king of Locris and father to Euboea. He may be the same with Macareus, father of Megaclite who consorted with Zeus and became the mother of Thebe and Locrus.
- Macareus, a king of Lesbos and son of Crinacus.
- Macareus of Rhodes, one of the Heliadae, children of Rhodus and Helios.
- Macareus, one of the Lapiths at the wedding of Pirithous and Hippodamia; he killed the Centaur Erigdupus.
- Macareus, a companion to Odysseus on his voyages, from Nericus, who also encountered Aeneas. He was one of those who got transformed into pigs by Circe, though he later transforms back to a man and is noted as one of only two companions of Odysseus who survive the journey.

== See also ==
- Macaristan (in Turkish) and Al Majar (in Arabic) names for Hungary based on its name, Magyarország, in Hungarian.
