= Hylonome =

Female centaur in Greek mythology

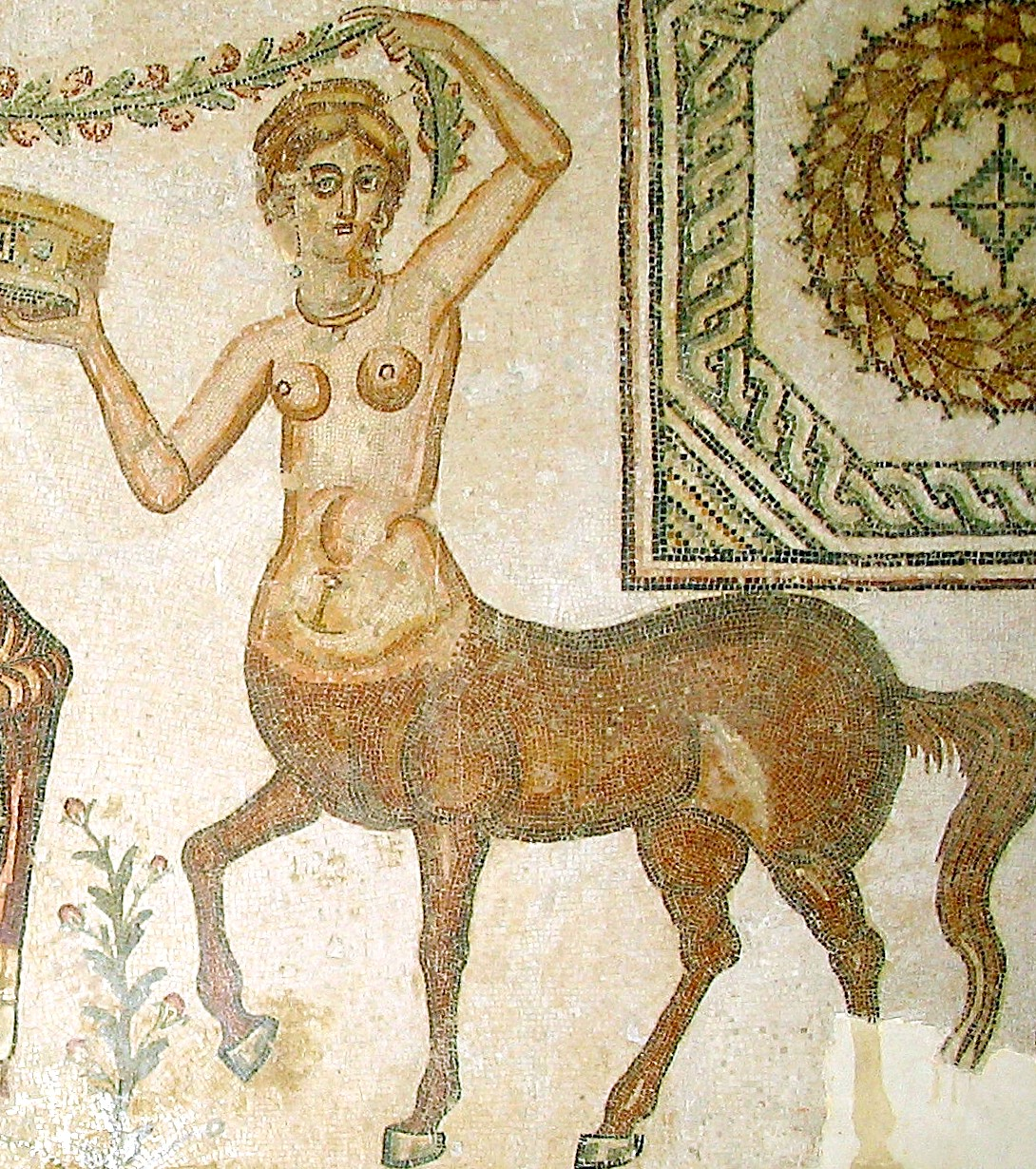
Centaury. Roman floor mosaic at the Bardo Museum in Tunis. 2nd century A.D.

Hylonome (/haɪˈlɒnəmiː/; from Ancient Greek: Ὑλονόμη) was a female centaur in Roman mythology.

== Mythology ==
Hylonome was present at the battle against the Lapiths, where she lost her husband, the centaur Cyllarus, whom she loved very much. Heartbroken, she then took her own life to join him.

The centaur lovers' episodic digression and their "ideally mutual relationship", is placed within Nestor's narration of the Battle of the Lapiths and Centaurs in Metamorphosis 12. Ovid alludes to two didactic poems, Lucretius' "De Rerum Natura" and Ovid's own "Ars Amatoria III". In the Cyllarus-Hylonome interlude he explores hybridity itself illustrating the relationships and "possible combinations of a number of conceptual opposites: natura and cultus, human and animal, male and female, love and war, and the contrasting values of lyric-elegiac and epic poetry".

== General and cited references ==
- Publius Ovidius Naso (1922). Metamorphoses. Translated by Brookes More. Boston: Cornhill Publishing Co. Online version at the Perseus Digital Library.
- Publius Ovidius Naso, Metamorphoses. Hugo Magnus. Gotha, Germany. Friedr. Andr. Perthes. 1892. Latin text available at the Perseus Digital Library.
