= Richard Tarrant =

Richard Tarrant may refer to:

- R. J. Tarrant, American classicist
- Richard Tarrant (politician) (1942–2025), American politician and businessman
- Richard "Dick" Tarrant (born 1928), American basketball coach
