= CIPU =

CIPU or Cipu may refer to:

- Cipu language, spoken in Nigeria
- CIPU-FM, Canadian first nations radio station
- Center for Intellectual Property Understanding, American organisation
- Critical Infrastructure Protection Unit of the Administration Police of Kenya

== See also ==
- Cipus, legendary Roman praetor
