= Pierre Eskrich =

French artist

Pierre Eskrich, born Pierre Krug and known variously as Pierre Cruche or Pierre Vase (c. 1518 – c. 1590), was a French engraver, illustrator and painter. Connected with humanists during the Reformation, one of his major works was the 16 piece Mappe-Monde Nouvelle Papistique made in 1566 for Jean Baptiste Trento to depict the Protestant's satirical view of the Catholic world. He also illustrated an unpublished project on birds.

== Life and work ==
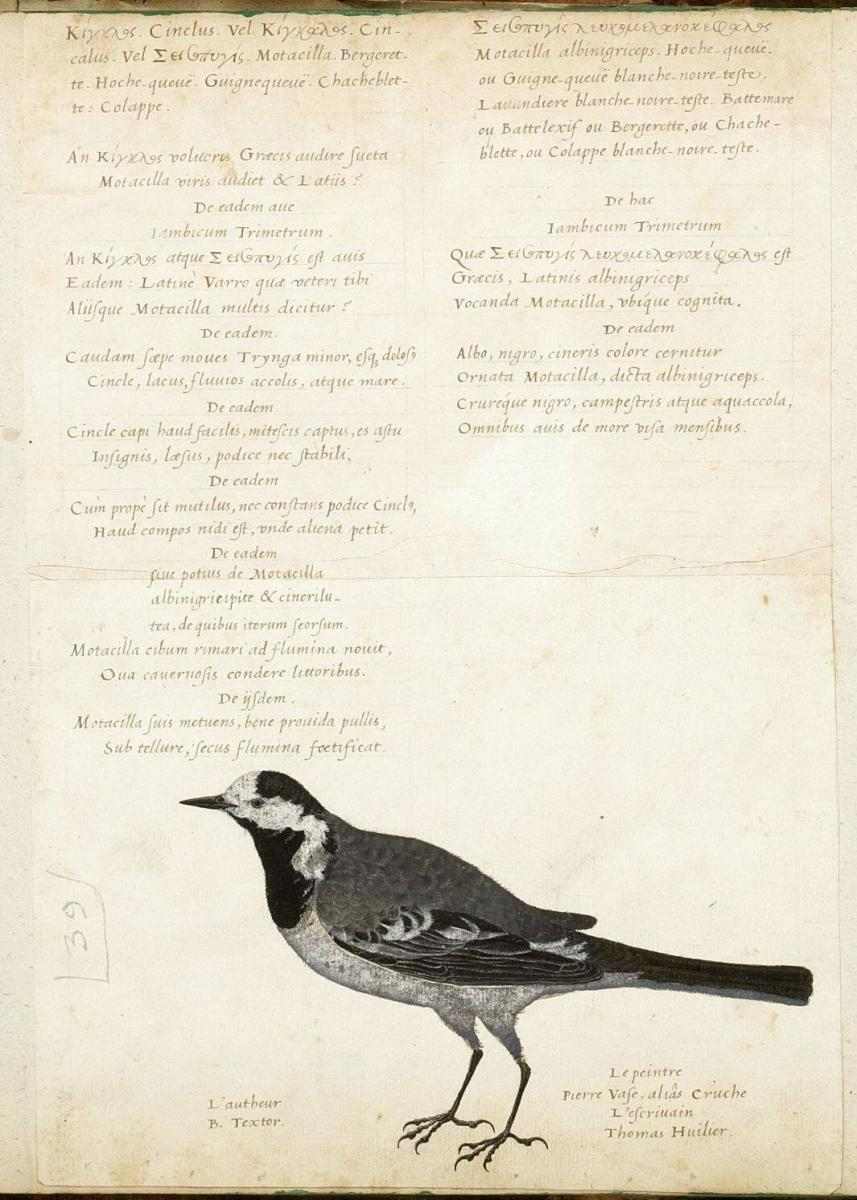
Illustration of a white wagtail for Benoit Textor

Eskrich was born in Paris, the son of a German goldsmith named Jacob Krug who came from Freiburg, Brisgau. The German surname Krug is spelled "Cruche" in the French form and literally means a jug which translates loosely to "Vase". In tax documents, he signed as Cruche and in artworks from 1566 to 1568 he signed as Petrus Eskircheus. Eskrich worked as an apprentice to Pierre Vallet, embroiderer for the Duke of Nevers. In 1573 he titled himself as embroiderer for François de Mandelot, the governor of Lyon. Verses from 1541 by Robert de Luz which play on Eskrich's alternate names of jug and vase suggest that Louis Giquel and Pierre Eskrich were seen as promising apprentice artists. Eskrich married Jeanne Berthet, daughter of a Protestant merchant in Lyon around 1548. He then called himself a painter and settled in Geneva in 1552 or 1554. The council of Geneva gave him an order to draw the city for Admiral de Coligny in 1564. He was also an illustrator for Calvinist literature. In 1561 he was involved in engraving the satirical Papistic World Map for Jean-Baptiste Trento. The map in sixteen pieces to cover a size of 1.34 x 1.7 m was finally produced in 1566, only five copies of which survive today. He was also producing wood engravings for use as frontispieces, ornaments and typography used in the works of Guillaume Rondelet, Balthazar Arnoullet, Jean Pillehotte, Berthelemy Honorat, and for the bookseller Guillaume Rouillé. Many of these woodblocks had the initials "PV" (Pierre Vase). Guillaume Rouillé published a natural history of plants in 1586 which made use of works by Eskrich. Eskrich also made studies of birds and plants with Jacques Daléchamps. Eskrich was also involved in a project to illustrate birds which was organized by Benoît Textor and his son Claude along with collaborations with Robert Constantin, Conrad Gessner, and Jean Tagaut.
