= Cerisy-Buleux =

- Commune
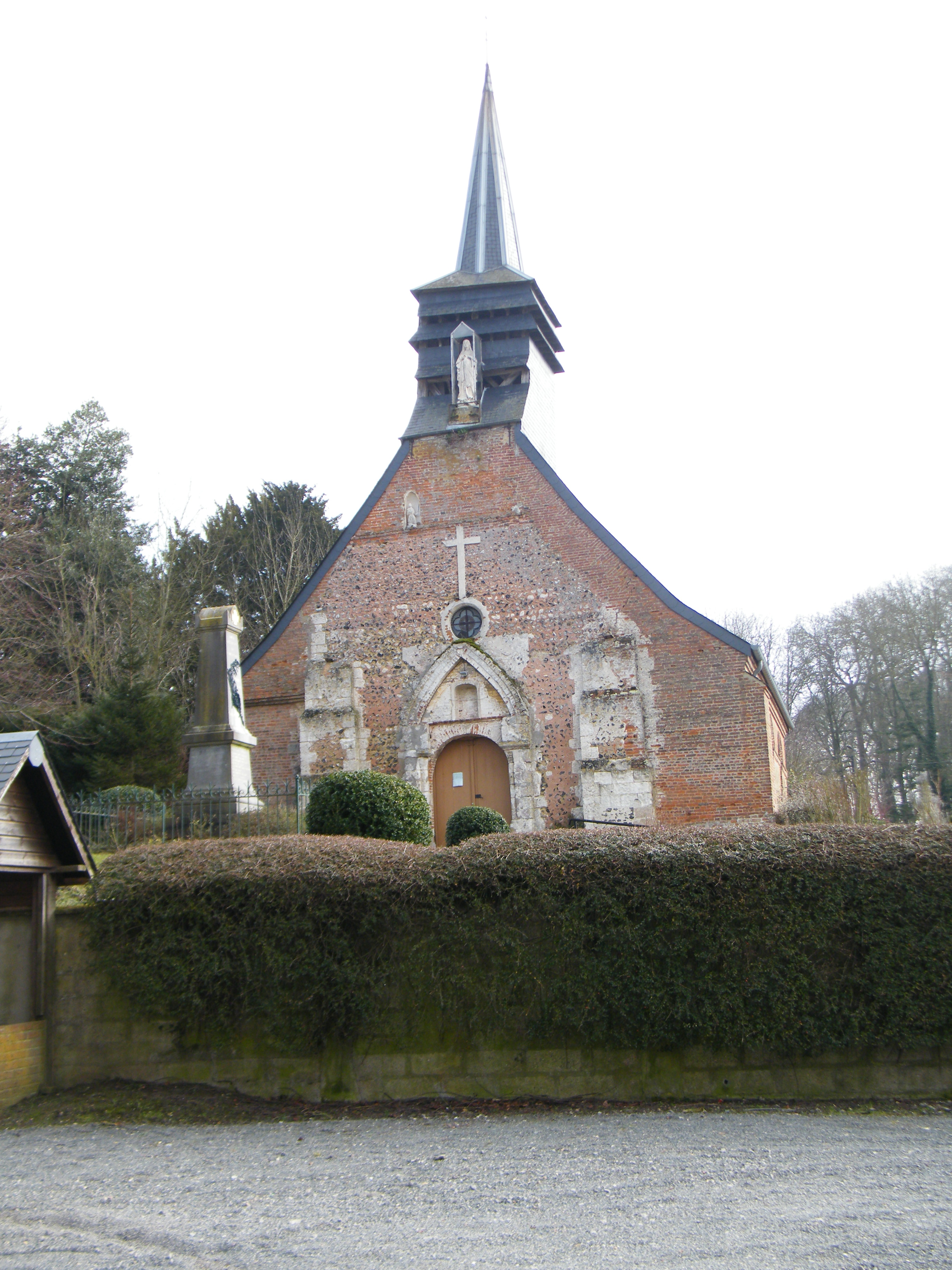
- The church in Cerisy-Buleux

- Coat of arms
- Location of Cerisy-Buleux
- Location within France Location within Hauts-de-France
- Coordinates: 49°58′33″N 1°44′23″E
- Country: France
- Region: Hauts-de-France
- Department: Somme
- Arrondissement: Amiens
- Canton: Poix-de-Picardie
- Intercommunality: CC Somme Sud-Ouest

Government
  - Mayor (2020–2026): Dominique Bayart
- Area^{1}: 5.6 km^{2} (2.2 sq mi)
- Elevation: 103 m (338 ft)
- Highest elevation: 127 m (417 ft)
- Lowest elevation: 96 m (315 ft)
- Population (2023): 278
  - Density: 50/km^{2} (130/sq mi)
- Time zone: UTC+01:00 (CET)
  - Summer (DST): UTC+02:00 (CEST)
- INSEE/Postal code: 80183 /80140
- ^{1} French Land Register data, which excludes lakes, ponds, glaciers > 1 km^{2} (0.386 sq mi or 247 acres) and river estuaries.

Cerisy-Buleux (French pronunciation: [səʁizi bylø]; Picard: Çrisin-Buleux) is a commune in the Somme department in Hauts-de-France in northern France.

== Geography ==
The commune is situated on the D190 road, some 15 miles (24 km) southwest of Abbeville.

== Population ==
Historical population
Year	Pop.	±% p.a.
1968	342	—
1975	281	−2.77%
1982	272	−0.46%
1990	278	+0.27%
1999	260	−0.74%
2007	254	−0.29%
2012	260	+0.47%
2017	266	+0.46%
2023	278	+0.74%
Source: INSEE

== Places of interest ==
- The old railway line:

The railway, opened in 1872, was closed on 10 November 1993. Mostly freight trains for the many farming cooperatives, there were also a few passenger trains.

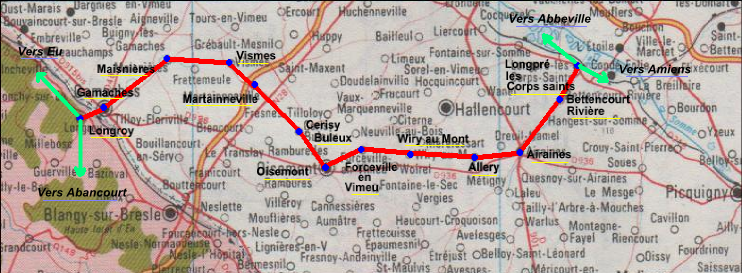

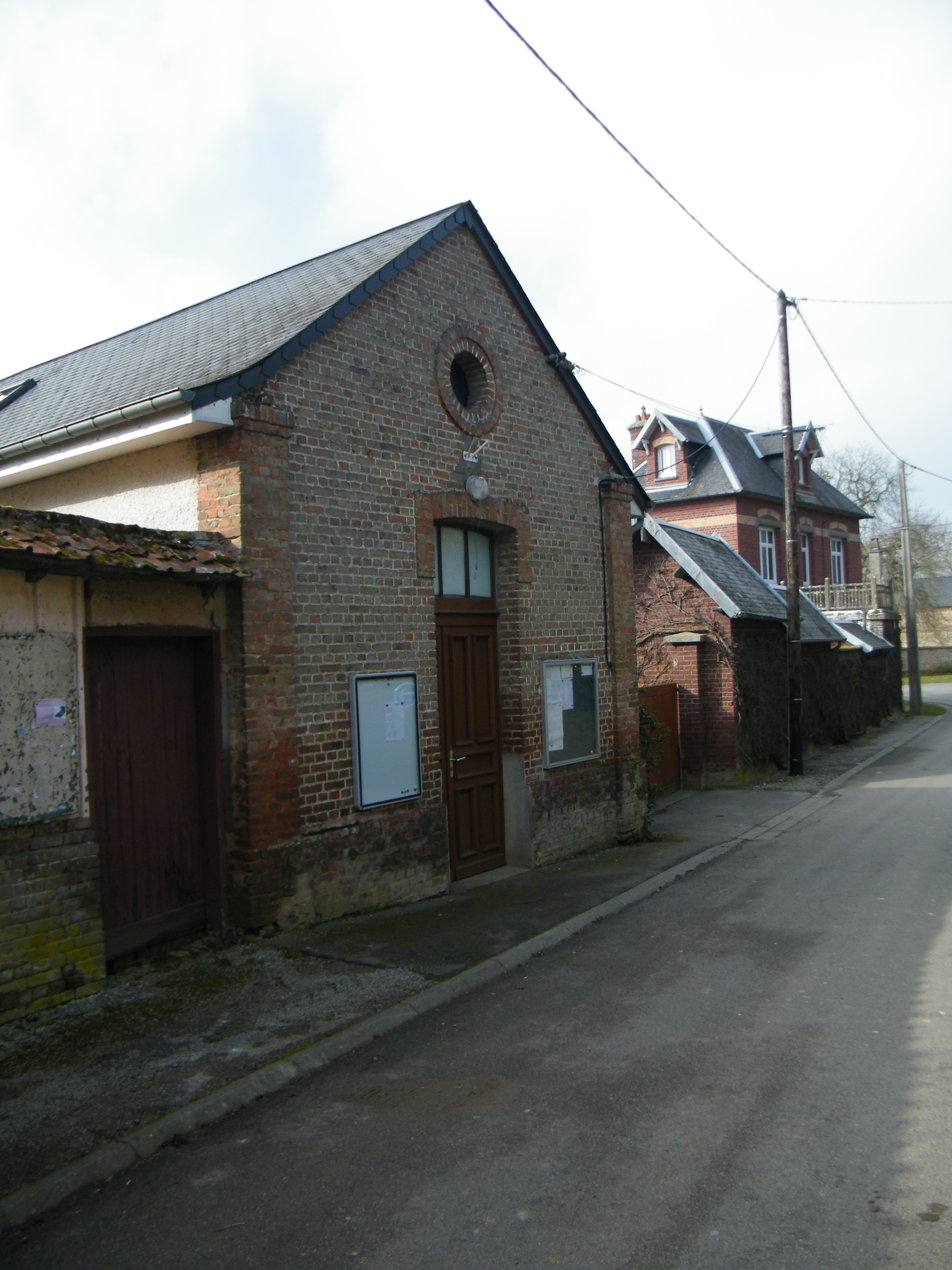
Townhall.

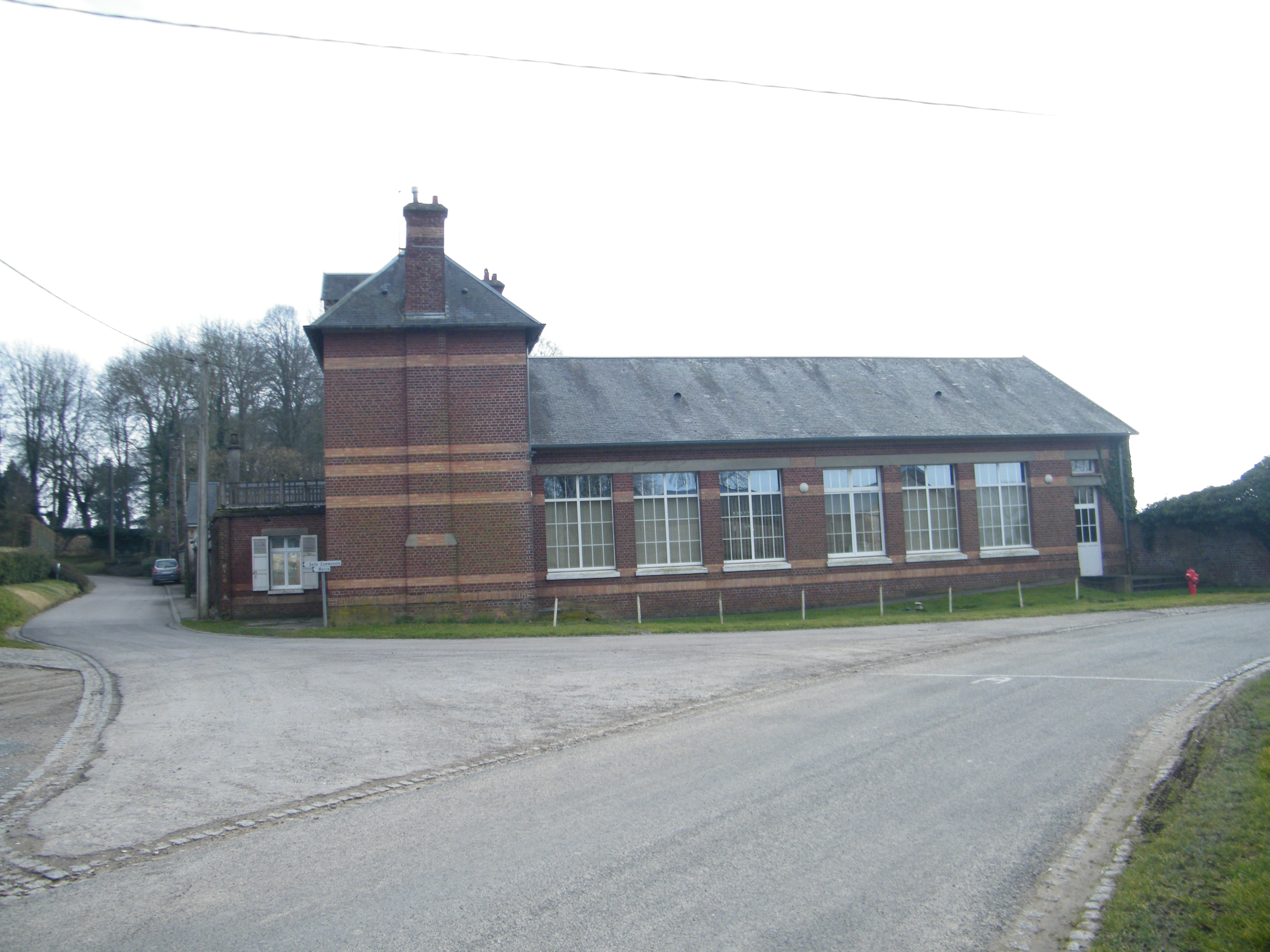
Old school.

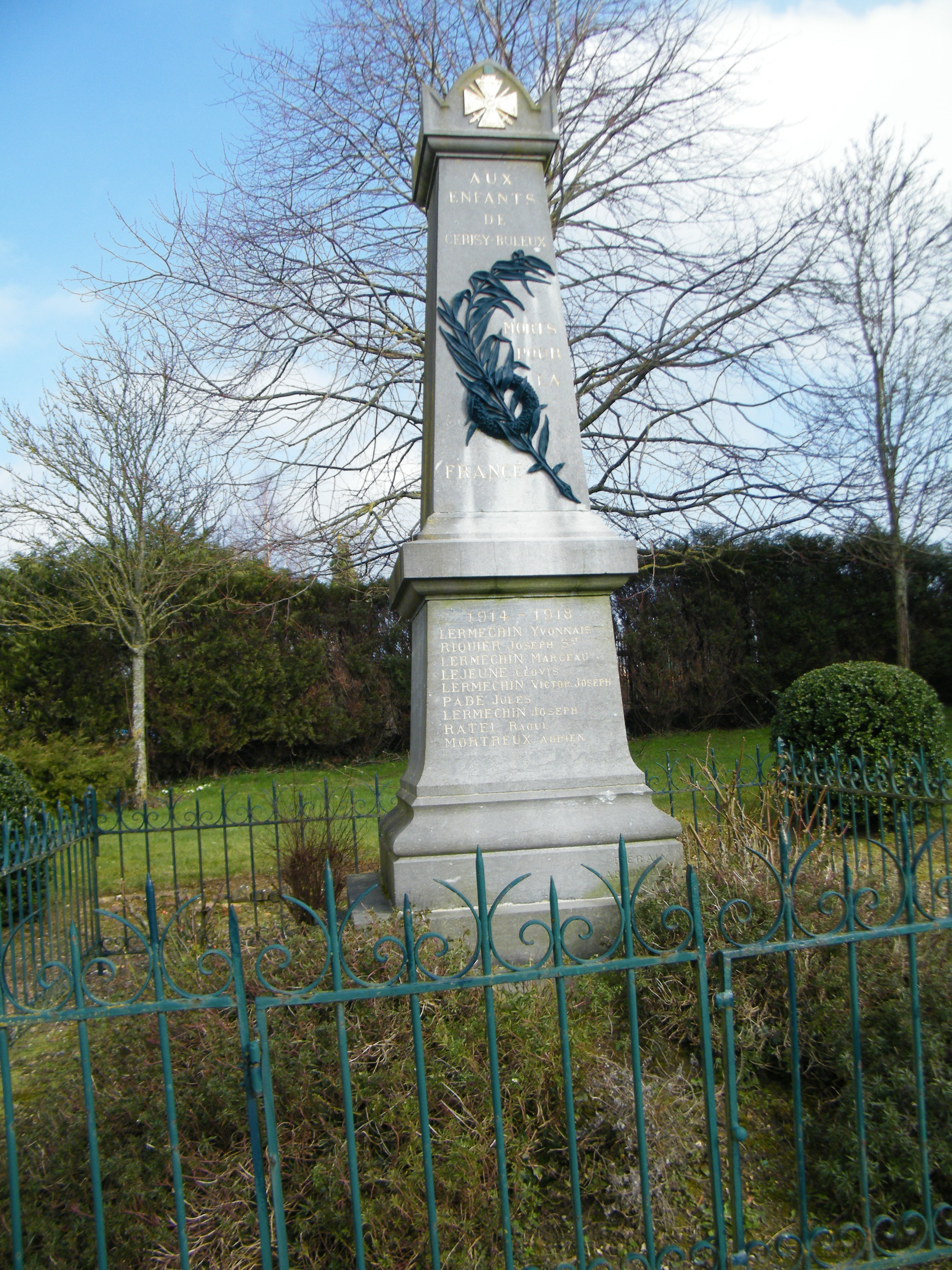
Monument.

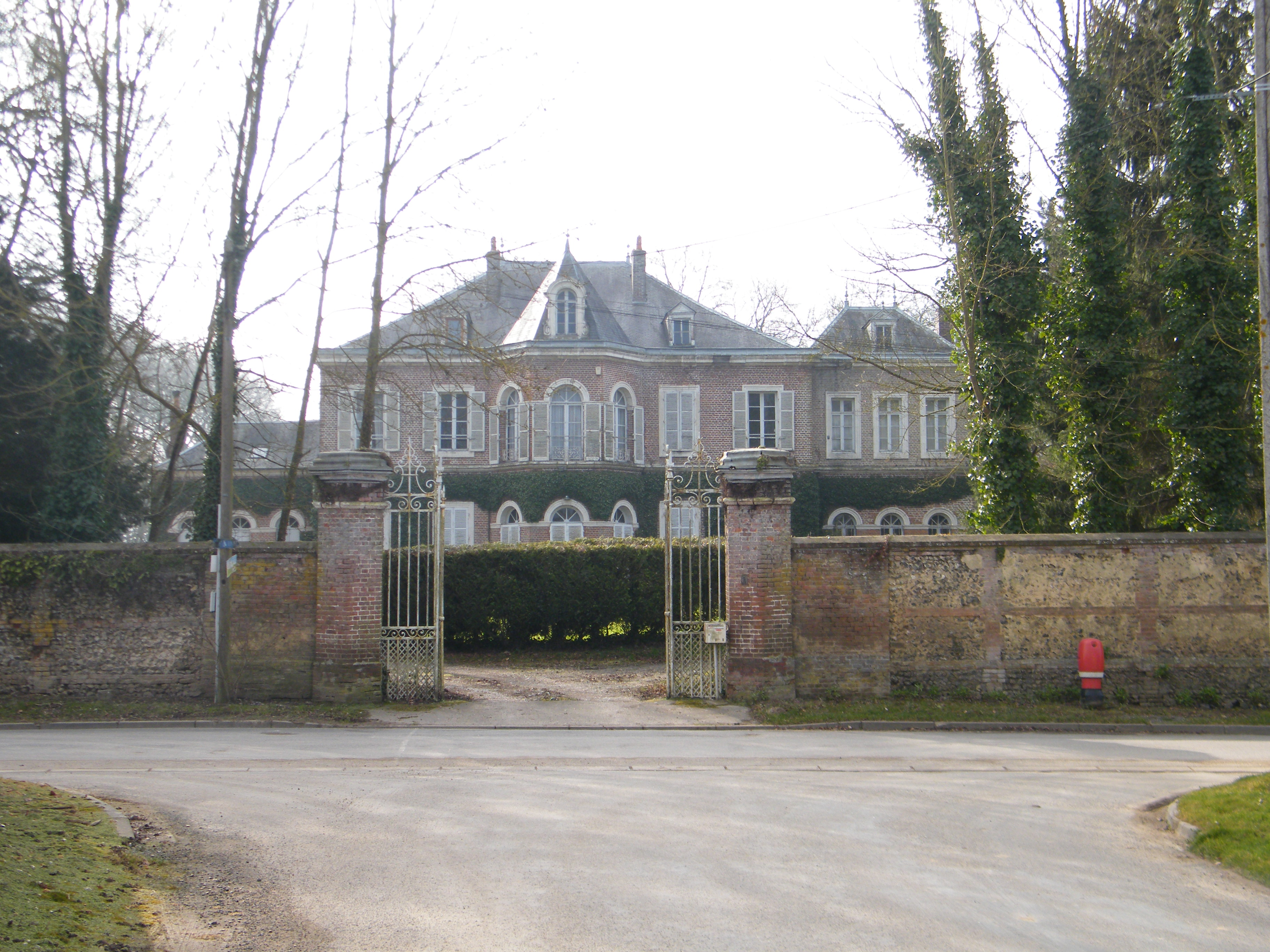
Castle, Arleux street.

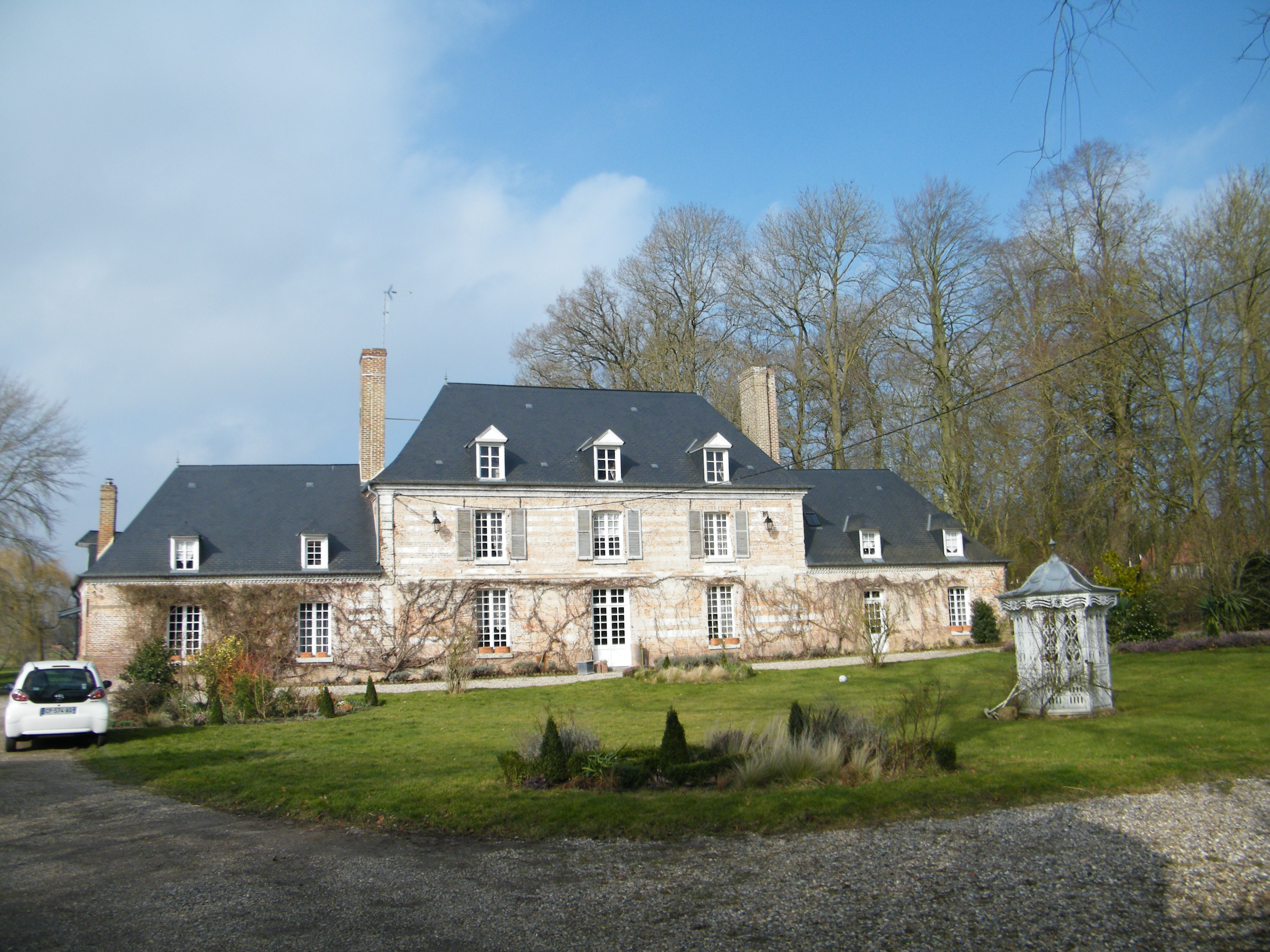
Castle, near the church.

== Personality ==
- Jean Tagault (circa 1499–1546), anatomist and surgeon.

== See also ==
- Communes of the Somme department
- Réseau des Bains de Mer
