= Franciscus Portus =

Greek-Italian Renaissance humanist and classical scholar

Franciscus Portus (Greek: Φραγκίσκος Πόρτος; Italian: Francesco Porto; 22 August 1511 – 5 June 1581) was a Greek-Italian Renaissance humanist and classical scholar.

== Biography ==
Born on 22 August 1511 in Rethymno or Candia, Venetian Crete, Portus was orphaned at a young age. He probably studied under Arsenius Apostolius in his youth, and seems to have followed his teacher to Venice. From 1526 to 1535, he was active as a copyist of Greek manuscripts. However, he was an adherent of Reformed Christianity, and certain mocking remarks he made about traditional religious customs, such as fasting and the veneration of images, resulted in his departure from Venice.

In 1536, Portus obtained a Chair in Greek at Modena, although he was unwilling to sign the declaration of faith which was required of public officials. In 1542, he was hired by Renée of France, the Duchess of Ferrara, as tutor to her sons. She also entrusted to him the secret correspondence she maintained with John Calvin. He was admitted to the Accademia dei Filareti, founded in Ferrara in 1554, and delivered a speech there in praise of the Greek language.

After the death of the Duke of Ferrara, Ercole II d'Este, in 1559, the Duchess returned to France. In fear of the Inquisition because of his religious views, Portus left Ferrara with his family, and spent some time in the area of Friuli before settling in Geneva, becoming a citizen of Geneva in 1562. In the same year, he was appointed to the Chair of Greek at the University of Geneva, which he occupied until his death. One of his most important students was Isaac Casaubon, whom he recommended to succeed him.

After the St. Bartholomew's Day massacre in 1572, he exchanged polemical correspondence with his former colleague Pierre Charpentier (jurist), who had become an instrument of French government propaganda and justified the massacre on the basis of an alleged plot against the royal family.

Portus died in Geneva on 5 June 1581.

== Scholarship ==
Portus corrected and annotated the texts of many Ancient Greek authors, and translated many into Latin, including Aristotle's Rhetoric, the treatises of Hermogenes of Tarsus, Aphthonius and pseudo-Longinus (edition printed by Jean Crespin in 1569), the Syntax of Apollonius Dyscolus, the hymns and letters of Synesius of Cyrene, and the Odes of Gregory of Nazianus.

He also produced commentaries on numerous authors: Homer, Pindar, the Greek tragedians (Aeschylus, Sophocles and Euripides), Aristophanes, Thucydides, Xenophon, Demosthenes, Theocritus, Dionysius of Halicarnassus.

He provided corrections and additional remarks to the Lexicon of Robert Constantin (Geneva, 1592).

Shortly after his death, his son published many further volumes of his work at Lausanne: Commentarii in Pindari Olympia, Pythia, Nemea, Isthmia (1583); six of his treatises entitled In omnes Sophoclis tragœdias prolegomena, Sophoclis et Euripidis collatio, etc. (1584); and Commentarii in varia Xenophontis opuscula (1586). He also published his Rhetoric of Aristotle at Speyer in 1598.

Portus' son Aemilius Portus (born in Ferrara, 13 August 1553; died in Stadthagen, 1614 or 1615) taught Greek in Geneva alongside his father from 1569, and then at Lausanne from 1581 to 1592, and then at Heidelberg from 1596 to 1608, and published numerous works (including works by his father).

== Modern editions of Portus' work ==
- Paolo Tavonatti (ed.), Francisci Porti Cretensis Commentaria in Aeschyli Tragoedias, doctoral thesis, University of Trento and EHESS, 2010. (Edition of Portus' commentaries on Aeschylus.)

== List of works ==
- 1568: Synesii Cyrenaei ... Hymni ... Gregorii Nazianzeni Odae aliquot ... Utrisque ... latinam interpretationem adiunxit F(ranciscus) P(ortus) C(retensis), Genevae.
- 1569: Oἱ ἐν ῥητορικῇ τέχνῃ κορυφαίοι, Aphthonius, Hermogenes et Dionysius Longinus praestantissimi artis rhetorices magistri, F(rancisci) P(orti) C(retensis) opera industriaque illustrati et expoliti, Genevae.
- 1573: Ad Petri Carpentarii Causidici virulentam epistolam, responsio Francisci Porti ... pro causariorum quos vocat innocentia.
- 1574: Response de François Portus Candiot, aux lettres diffamatoires de Pierre Carpentier, ... pour l'innocence des fidèles serviteurs de Dieu ... massacrez le 24 jour d'aoust 1572, appellez factieux par ce plaidereau, traduite nouvellement de latin en françois.
- 1580: Homeri Ilias, postrema editio ... a F(rancisco) P(orto) C(retense) innumeris in locis emendata, Genevae.
- 1583: Francisci Porti ... Commentarii in Pindari Olympia, Pythia, Nemea, Isthmia, Genevae.
- 1584: Francisci Porti Cretensis in omnes Sophoclis tragoedias προλεγόμενα, ut vulgò vocantur. In quibus Ipsa Poêtæ vita, genùsque dicendi declaratur. De Tragœdia, eiusque origine, et de Tragœdiæ, atque Comœdiæ discrimine paucis agitur. Sophoclis, et Euripidis collatio brevis instituitur, et quibus in rebus vterque potissimùm excellat, apertè demonstratur. Singularum verò Tragœdiarum Argumenta cum artificio Rhetorico separatim exponuntur. His addita ΠΑΡΑΣΚΕΥΗ´ ad orationem Demosthenis περὶ παραπρεσβείας, cui accesserunt Sex Oratiunculæ Latinæ, quas idem F.P. olim in Illustriss. Ducis Ferrariensis Academia Mutinensi Linguæ Græcæ Professor habuit. Singulis Oratiunculis suum argumentum paucis est ascriptum, Morgiis.
- 1586: Francisci Porti ... Commentarii in varia Xenophontis opuscula, Lausannae.
- 1590: Apollonii Alexandrini de syntaxi ... libri IIII. A Francisco Porto ante aliquot annos e manuscripto codice passim & correcti & suppleti, Francofurti.
- 1592: Lexicon graecolatinum R. CONSTANTINI. Secunda hac editione, partim ipsius authoris partim Francisci Porti & aliorum additionibus plurimum auctum, Genevae.
- 1594: Thucydidis, Olori filii, de Bello Peloponnesiaco libri octo. Iidem latine, ex interpretatione Laurentii Vallae, ab Henrico Stephano nuper recognita, quam Aemilius Portus, Francisci Porti Cretensis f., paternos commentarios accurate sequutus, ab infinita ... errorum multitudine ... repurgavit ... in hac postrema editione, Francofurti.
- 1598: Aristotelis Artis rhetoricae, sive de arte dicendi, libri III, a M. Aemilio Porto ... nova interpretatione illustrati; item Francisci Porti ... in eosdem libros perpetui latini commentarii, Spirae.
