= Jean Desjardins =

French royal physician from the 16th century

- Born: Laon, France
- Died: c. 1547–1549
- Other name: Ioannes Hortensius
- Occupations: Royal physician, professor, dean

Academic background
- Influences: Galen

Academic work
- Discipline: Medicine
- Institutions: University of Paris
- Doctoral students: Jean Tagault

Jean Desjardins (in Latin: Ioannes Hortensius; died c. 1547–1549) was a French physician, academic and royal doctor from the 16th century. He was a member of the Faculty of Medicine of the University of Paris, where he acted as a doctor and later on as a dean. He is recorded as having been a royal doctor for King Francis I of France.

== Name ==
Desjardins' Latinized name, Ioannes Hortensius, derives from the French surname "Desjardins", which means "of the gardens". Humanists scholars at the time had the practice of translating their vernacular names to Latin, and often were known by and published under these names.

== Career ==
Jean Desjardins held the position of doctor regent at the Faculty of Medicine of Paris, and then acted as a dean.

He was associated with the royal court as the physician of King Francis I. It is mentioned in The Universal Dictionary of Biography and Mythology:

"(...) became one of the physicians of Francis I., and had so great a reputation that it was believed he could cure all diseases, provided the fatal hour had not arrived. Some punster applied to him this proverb "Contra vim mortis, non est medicamen in hortis." " The proverb can be interpreted as "Against the power of death, there is no remedy in the gardens (even in the hands of Hortensius).", hense why it is considered a rhyming pun with his name.

He was the dean at the Faculty of Medicine of Paris at the time Jean Tagault got his doctorate (1524). He understood Greek perfectly and strongly encouraged his students to study this language, this way they could consult the original texts of Galen. He donated a Greek edition of Galen's work to the faculty library.

== Family ==
His father, also named Jean Desjardins, was captain of the castle of Le Hamel, and his mother was Charlotte Waudin. He was married to Jeanne Bourdin at 1520, with whom he had seven children; and later on with Marie Le Tellier, with whom he had more four children. One of his sons with Jeanne also inherited his name, Jean Desjardins.
