= Tragedy in Ovid's Metamorphoses =

Tragic themes are ever-present in the world of ancient epic. Ancient tragedians often focused on ideas such as mythology, love, passion and violence in their works and these are clearly reflected in epic, especially in Ovid's Metamorphoses. Tragic themes do not simply refer to subject matter however and can also be used in reference to the format of the writing, such as utilizing dramatic monologues, or soliloquies, metatheatre, and emphasizing time and place.

== Tragedy in antiquity ==
The modern idea of tragedy evokes a very different image than it would in the time of Ovid. Today, the word tragic implies a sense of sad, unfortunate, or pitiful. However, the term at its most basic refers to the idea of tragedy as a poetic genre. Greek tragedy at its most basic refers to a form of theatre that was present in Athens in the 5th century BC. There are only three poets whose works have survived the centuries: Aeschylus, Sophocles, and Euripides. Tragic plays most often depicted well known myths of the time and utilized a minimal cast as well as a chorus. One of the most basic ways that we see tragedy in the Metamorphoses is in how Ovid borrows a variety of stories from ancient Greek and Roman tragedy and retells them in a way that is both unique to his style and pays homage to genre itself. Throughout the Metamorphoses Ovid plays with the concept of tragic appropriation, that is, taking themes, motifs, and structure from ancient tragedy and translating them into his own epic. This is not a new concept and has been seen before in the epic work of Virgil, the Aeneid, which is deeply rooted in tragedy and was most likely an important influence on Ovid's works.

== Themes ==
Ovid utilizes a variety of tragic themes throughout the Metamorphoses. Some of these themes simply involve the subject matter, but some involve thematic and narrative devices. Both of these types are equally important to understanding how Ovid connects with and employs the idea of tragedy in his epic.

=== Metatheatre and theatricality ===
Metatheatre refers to when a drama calls attention to the fact that it is a drama. This can be shown through characters realizing they are dramatic characters, narrators blatantly stating that the actions are not real, or a variety of other devices. In the instance of the Metamorphoses tragedy itself is being translated into another genre, which is very metatheatrical in nature. In its classic usage, the success of the metatheatre elements is dependent on whether or not there is an audience. In this line of thought, the success of Ovid's transformations throughout the epic, and of the genre itself, is dependent on whether or not there are readers that understand his references. Though understanding the references made throughout the epic are not necessary for understanding the basic plots and subplots, having a prior knowledge of the myths depicted can help a reader to engage more fully with the text and to see how these connections come together.

==== Actaeon ====
The story of Actaeon is one of the first presented in the Metamorphoses that is very metatheatrical in nature. One of the first known appearances of this myth was in a tragedy written by Aeschylus in the 5th century BC, the Toxotides, or the Female Archers. The myth, as presented in the Metamorphoses shows Actaeon coming across the sight of Diana, or Artemis in the Greek tragedy, bathing herself. Upon being discovered, Actaeon is turned into a deer and eventually killed by his own pack of hunting dogs. Though the full text of Aeschylus' tragedy is lost to modern readers, it would have been known by the audiences of antiquity. Due to this prior knowledge, they would experience a juxtaposition of Actaeon's role in the Metamorphoses versus his role in the Toxotides. Audiences would already be aware of Actaeon's role as a tragic character, which enhances Ovid's telling of the story and lends itself to the metatheatre concept.

==== Hecuba ====
Hecuba is another character which ancient audiences would clearly recognize from the tragic stage. Hecabe is the star of two different tragedies by Euripides, the Trojan Women and the Hecuba itself. The Trojan Women features Hecuba and a variety of other women of Troy lamenting their losses after the city is taken and sacked. The women discuss their fates and the fates of others in Troy as they are divided up as the spoils of war. The action of the Hecuba follows this and shows Hecuba as a captive of the Greeks on their voyage home from Troy. In the Metamorphoses Ovid utilizes both of Hecuba's tragic appearances and combines them into one narrative. Hecuba's departure from Troy at the end of the Trojan Women is her entrance into the Metamorphoses and the action of both plays is touched on through her narrative in the epic. It can be seen here that since ancient audiences would already be well versed in her story, Ovid does not feel the need to go into detail about every piece of her history. This prior knowledge makes Hecuba's character metatheatrical in nature because it would not be possible without an audience.

==== Polyxena ====
Like Actaeon and Hecuba before her, Polyxena is a well known character from the tragic stage, whose story is modified or condensed in order to fit into the realm of Ovid's epic. Polyxena's most famous act is that of her death, depicted in the Trojan Women and discussed in the Hecabe. In both plays, Polyxena must be sacrificed by the Greeks in order to gain the favor of the wind and successfully sail home. In the Metamorphoses, Polyxena's lengthy lamentations from the Hecabe is condensed down to under fifty lines. However, in these fifty lines Polyxena becomes aware of her role as a tragic heroine and delivers her monologue as such. Once Polyxena is brought to the altar she "realized that she would be the victim of this cruel sacrifice, and not even then did she forget herself." In this moment, though the action itself is speaking of Polyxena not forgetting that she is of noble blood, it also speaks to her remembering that this tragic role is the one she is meant to play throughout time. Whereas in Euripides version of her story, Polyxena's final words are retold by another, in this epic, Ovid lets her speak for herself, allowing for the metatheatre concepts to sink in a bit more. Throughout her short speech, Polyxena echoes the sentiments she has previously expressed in her Euripidean appearances, as well as expressing original thoughts and ideas. By expressing these thoughts, that have never been illustrated in tragedy previously, Poyxena takes control of her own narrative and ends her speech the way she would like, instead of through the mouth of another.

=== Dramatic monologue ===
The Metamorphoses places a large emphasis on the narrative device of the extended monologue. The epic features thirteen monologues that are a minimum of fifteen lines and are delivered by a wide variety of characters. The purpose of these monologues is exactly the same as their purpose in ancient tragedy: "to articulate thoughts, laments, questions, plans, and rationales" that would otherwise not be expressed in the action or that must be shown in a first person narration. Monologues in Ovid's epics, as in their tragic predecessors, aim to transform the character in some way by calling attention to their inner workings and emotions and how they affect the dramatic action surrounding them.

==== Medea ====
The speech given by Medea in Book VII of the Metamorphoses can be considered the poem's first fully dramatic monologue. The speech is over sixty lines of text and is the longest full speech in the entire epic given by a man or a woman. In Medea's speech she seems to react to her previous appearances in tragic texts and epic, weaving metatheatrical elements into her monologue as she becomes aware of herself. Medea truly is the narrator of her own story and in her own narration the reader is given a look at the rationale behind the actions of Medea throughout her other dramatic appearances. In the Metamorphoses Ovid continually stresses Medea's use of incantation and magic and her ability to create and destroy. In this vein it seems as though she feels responsible for creating a relationship with Jason and feels as though she must save him. Medea's continual return to incantation and the emphasis on language shows how she is able to use her power to create her own story. Where as in other texts, Medea is consistently able to outwit her opponents and gain victory through rhetoric, the Medea that is shown in the Metamorphosesis overtaken by emotion and cannot seem to accurately verbalize it. This direct contrast between the Medea that ancient audiences would know and the one they are presented with here shows how Ovid is taking, not only themes from tragedy, but characters as well, and translating them into his own version.

==== Hecuba ====
The dramatic speech given by Hecuba in Book XIII of the Metamorphoses is the last full monologue of the epic. Both the first and last full monologues of this epic are delivered by women, which lends itself to analyzing the development of the female portrayal throughout the piece. Medea's speech, previously discussed, is rash and scattered, illustrating her emotional distress, while also showing the beginnings of the female oratory in the poem. In contrast, Hecuba's speech is polished and refined, showing not only the dignity of the fallen queen, even in her darkest times, but also emphasizing the growth of the portrayal of women throughout the epic. Hecuba's lame over her daughters dead body also recalls back to the small speech given by Thisbe in Book IV. Though Thisbe is not given a full monologue, she makes use of the lines she is given to lament over the death of her love Pyramus. Hecuba draws on the tragic themes presented in Thisbe's lamentation and expands upon them, expressing the death of a daughter instead of a lover. Hecuba's speech opens with her asking the gods what else she could possibly lose, after having her family slaughtered, her city sacked, and herself taken as a prisoner. This theme of all being lost to war and death is a common one throughout the world of ancient tragedy. This theme is most clearly illustrated in Aeschylus' great trilogy the Oresteia and in Sophocles' trilogy on Oedipus. As in Hecuba's speech, characters from the works of Aeschylus and Sophocles both lament their great losses and what has led them to this point. One of the best examples of this theme that Ovid so clearly draws upon is the speech given by a messenger in Oedipus Rex that tells of the death of Jocasta and the blinding of Oedipus. This famous speech follows in the same theme of that given by Hecuba, previous actions and the fates that lead characters to destruction and death.

==== Hercules ====
The monologue given by Hercules in Book IX of the Metamorphoses is even more textually related to his previous appearances in tragic works. Whereas Medea and Hecuba spoke in a way that was based on their previous appearances but was fundamentally different in speech, Hercules' soliloquy is very thematically and rhetorically similar to the speech he gives in Sophocles' Women of Trachis. Hercules' speech in Sophocles' tragedy spans an extensive sixty plus lines and discusses not only his current condition after being poisoned by Deianira, but also details the twelve labors he has successfully completed prior to the poisoning and a variety of prayers to Zeus and Hades. The monologue given in Ovid's telling of the story is very similar in structure and content. In the Metamorphoses, Hercules' speech is cut down to under thirty lines, but still details his labors and current condition. However, in contrast to his Sopholcean speech, this Hercules places the blame for his poisoning on Juno and laments about how unfair his current condition is, instead of blaming Deianira and offering up prayers to the gods.

=== Mythology ===
Tragedy as a genre is generally devoted to the telling of Greek and Roman myths and legends, and within the genre of tragedy, individual plays work to retell individual myths or connected stories. At its core, mythology is an interconnected network of symbols, patterns and structures all working together to create a culture of values and ideas. Though mythology examines supernatural events, the subject matter also aims to connect these events to real world ideas and values. We see the myth of Icarus and Daedalus illustrated in the Metamorphoses teaching readers not to fly too close to the sun and let their pride and glory get the best of them. There is the myth of Lycaon's transformation into a wolf, which appears at the beginning of the epic, warning readers of the dangers of impiety and cruelty. We especially see the myths of Medea and Hercules in Ovid's epic, translating their stories from the tragic stage into the written tale. The whole of the Metamorphoses is built on the stories that have been told and retold throughout ancient history, these common knowledge myths that shape the culture of the times. Mythology is the main subject matter within the tragic genre, so it must be included by Ovid in the epic in order to effectively translate their tragic themes into his writing.
