= Benoit Textor =

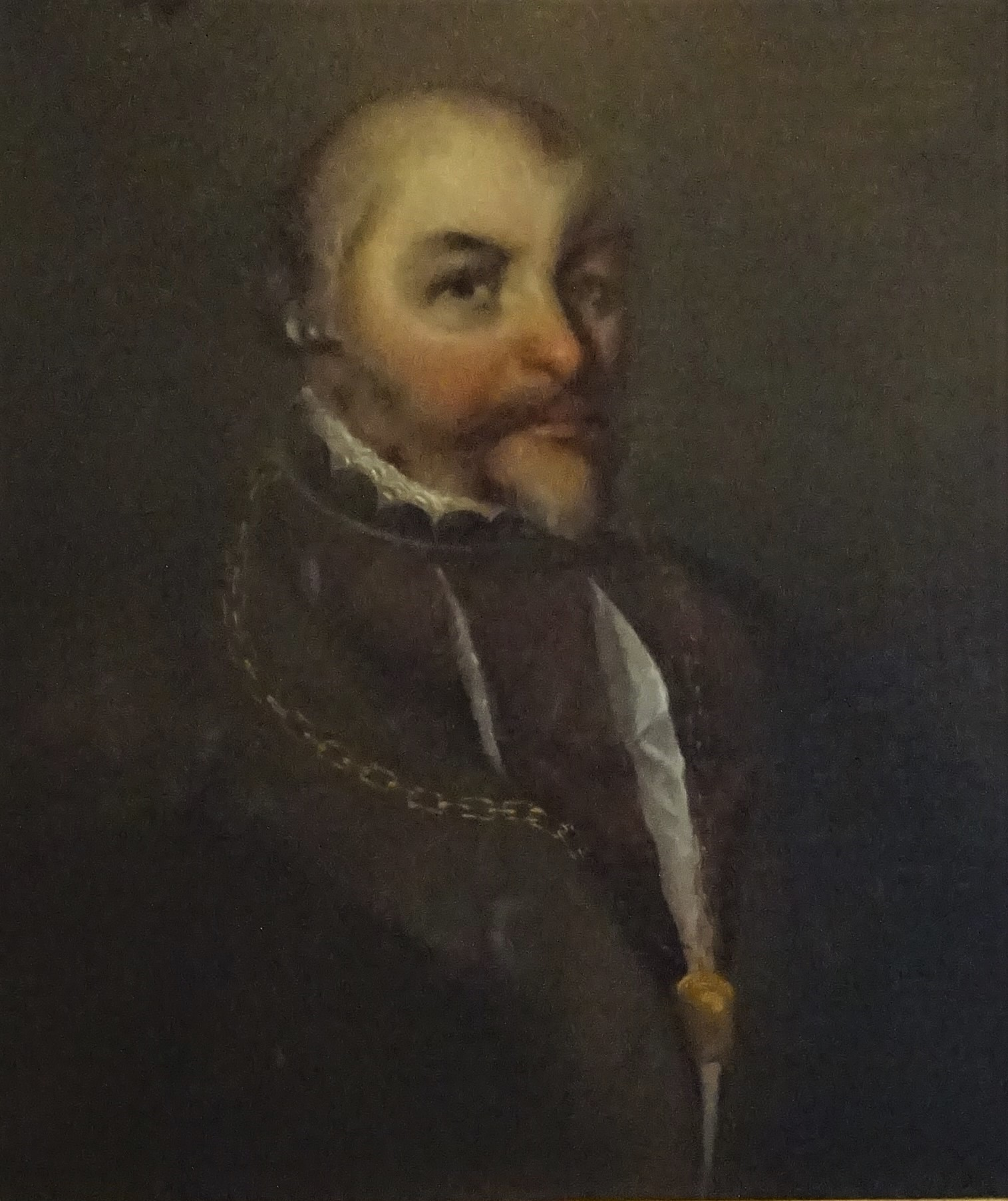
A portrait painting from the Musée Antoine Chintreuil, Pont-de-Vaux

Benoît Textor or Tessier Latinized as Benedictus Textorius Segusianus (c. 1509 – c. 1565) was a French physician and naturalist. He was a friend of John Calvin and Pierre Viret. He took an interest in the study of birds and compiled a work along with his son Claude Textor (1538–c.1576) and Jean Tagaut, the son of his teacher.

== Life and work ==
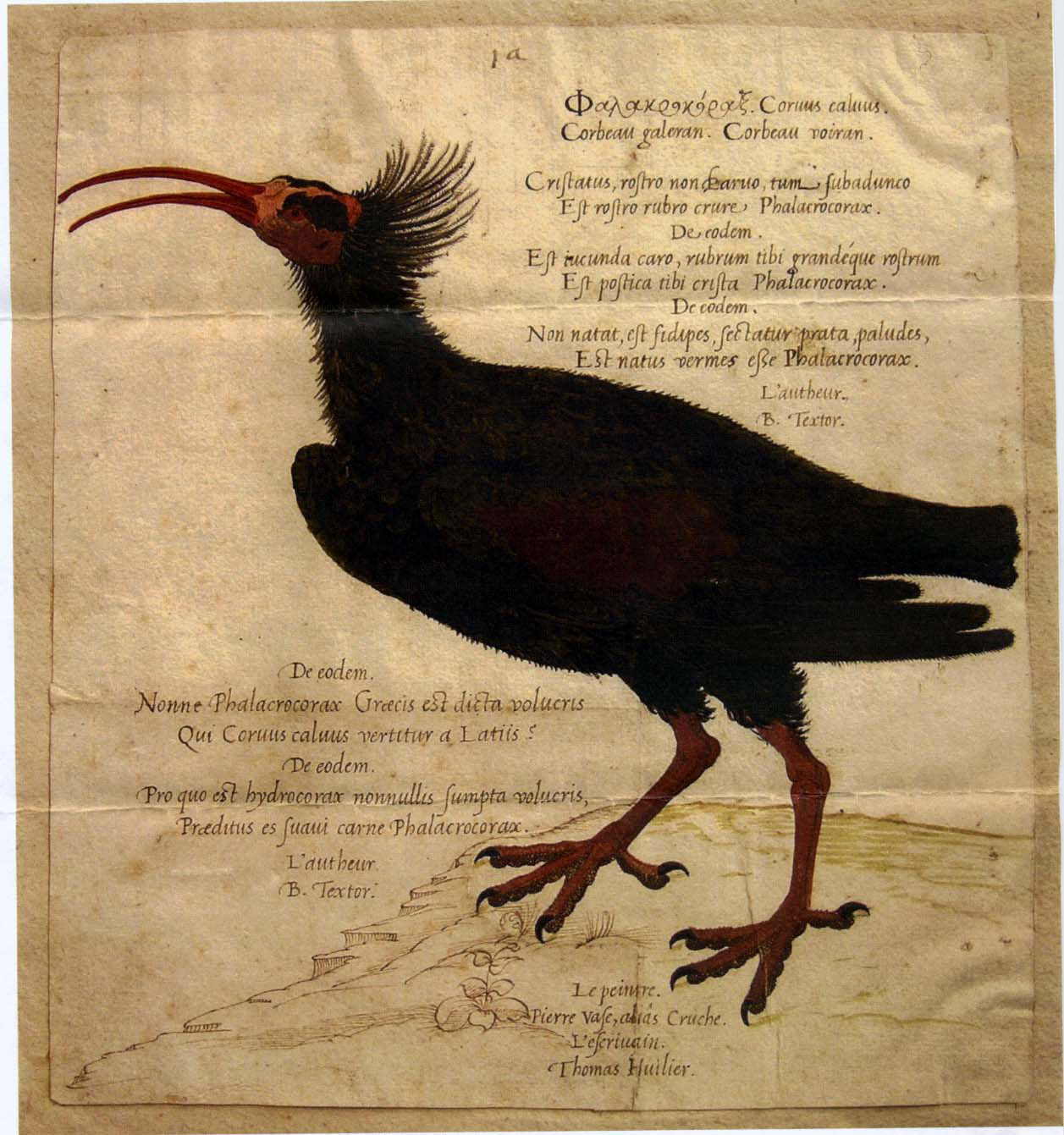
Illustration of a Northern bald ibis attributed to Pierre Eskrich from Textor's manuscript work on birds

Textor was born in Pont de Vaux in the La Bresse region. He studied at Lyon or Macon and was taught by Eloi de Verger. He then lived at the home of his tutor Jean Tagaut in Paris and attended lectures by Jacques Dubois. Tagaut's son Jean fled during the Reformation. Textor was also influenced by humanists and became a friend of Jean Calvin. Textor moved later to Macon, followed by Neuchatel (1542) and Geneva (1543, 1559). In 1536 he married Jeanne de Quincy. He later became a royal physician to Francois I and wrote several books including one on cancer and malignancy (1550) and another on plague (1551). His work on cancer was translated into English, probably by Anthony Hunton, which was then incorporated into a 1588 book by William Clowes. Textor also wrote a 1537 book, Stirpium differentiae ex Dioscoride, on the medicinal plants from Dioscorides. Textor's son Claude became a mathematician and another son, Vincent wrote on wine. Yet another son, David, became an assistant to Nicolas des Gallars, the secretary of Calvin. An illustrated manuscript of a project on birds compiled by Textor along with his sons Claude and Vincent; and Jean Tagaut (junior) was discovered in 2007 in the New York Historical Society collections. It included 219 illustrations of European birds, many made by Pierre Vase (or Eskrich), alias Cruche. Textor died somewhere between 1560 and 1565, possibly during an epidemic of plague.
