= Cipus =

Legendary Roman praetor

Cipus was a legendary Roman praetor famous for his pietas. After receiving a prophecy that he would become king of Rome, he chose voluntary exile instead of the throne. He is mentioned by Ovid in his Metamorphoses, Pliny the Elder in Natural History, and Valerius Maximus.

== In literature ==
Ovid's treatment of Cipus in Book 15 of Metamorphoses is the most thorough. According to Ovid, Cipus notices that he has grown horns on his head after seeing his reflection in a stream. He declares that if the omen is good it should benefit his lands and the inhabitants of Quirinus (i.e., Rome), but if the omen is ill it should fall solely on his shoulders. Cipus then builds new altars and makes sacrifices to the gods. A seer who examined the entrails spilled during the sacrifice prophesies that Cipus would enter Rome and be chosen its king.

Cipus decides that living in exile is preferable to being made king and devises a plan. He hides his horns with a garland of laurel and calls a meeting of the citizens and the Roman Senate. At this gathering, he warns that it has been prophesied that someone with horns on his head will enter Rome, be made its king, and give the citizens laws as if they were slaves. Cipus does not reveal that he is the prophesied king, but, instead, tells the people that he has hindered this king.

At the end of his speech, Cipus removes the garland of laurel and reveals his horns. The people are awe struck by this revelation, but soon place a festive headdress on Cipus' head since they cannot allow him to remain in Rome un-honored. The Senate then grants Cipus lands equal to the amount that oxen could encircle in one day and he leaves the city in exile.

Finally, the image of Cipus' horns is carved on the gates of the city gate and his name is remembered for ages to come.

== Relevant literature ==
- Marks, Raymond. "Of Kings, Crowns, and Boundary Stones: Cipus and the hasta Romuli in" Metamorphoses" 15." In Transactions of the American Philological Association, pp. 107-131. The Johns Hopkins University Press, 2004.
