= Jean Tagault =

French physician and anatomist

- Born: c. 1499; Vimy or more certainly in Cerisy-Buleux, France
- Died: 25 April 1546; Paris, France
- Other name: Joannes Tagaultius
- Education: University of Paris
- Spouse: Jeanne Lourdel
- Children: Jean Tagaut
- Scientific career
- Fields: Surgery
- Workplaces: University of Paris
- Doctoral advisor: Jean Desjardins
- Notable students: Jacques Houllier, Jacobus Sylvius, Benoît Textor

Jean Tagault or Jean Tagaut (in Latin: Joannes Tagaultius; c. 1499 – 25 April 1546) was a French physician and anatomist known for his surgical work and for having fought against Michel Servet who defended judicial astrology and divination as sciences. He is often confused with his son Jean Tagaut, a doctor and poet.

== Biography ==
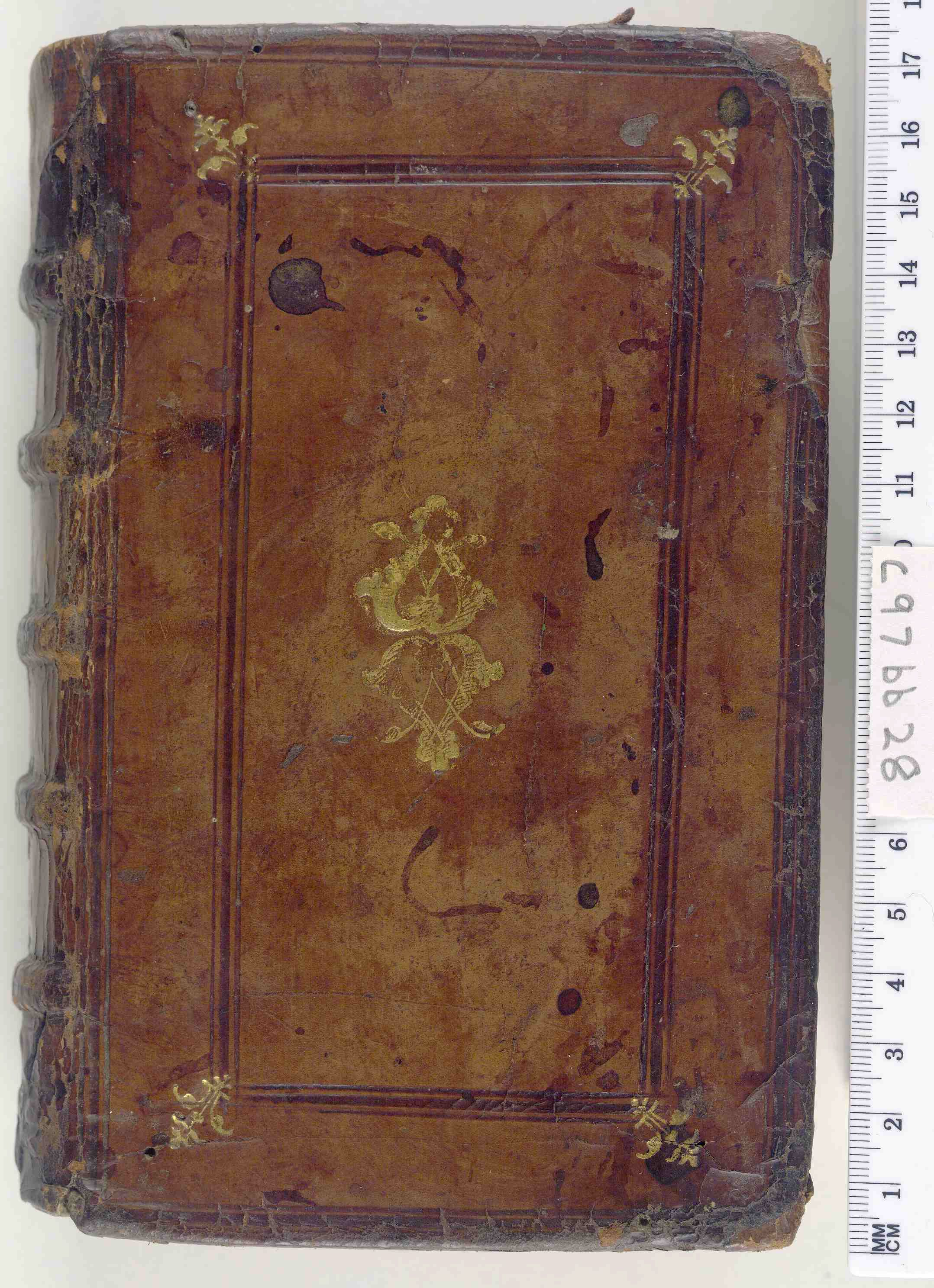
Les Institutions chirurgiques of Jean Tagault

He studied philosophy and literature at the Collège de Chanac Pompadour before becoming a teacher at the same college. Then he studied medicine at the Faculty of Medicine in Paris, where in 1524 he obtained his medical degree and later that year his doctorate, under deanship of Jean Desjardins. He married Jeanne Lourdel and had at least one son, his namesake, Jean Tagaut (ca.1515 - 1560), a poet and friend of Pierre de Ronsard, who is often confused with him. The family lived in rue de la Huchette in Paris. Already by this time, Tagault must have chosen the camp of the Evangelical Lutheran Church, and later he was even consulted by Calvin who was ill (1544). To pay for his studies and feed his family, Tagault taught mathematics at Collège du Cardinal-Lemoine.

On 18 November 1525, he became a medical regent and in 1534 he became dean of the Faculty, a position he held for 4 years.

In this capacity he opposed Michel Servet who had come to Paris to study medicine, then a lecturer in mathematics at the Collège des Lombards, where he taught geometry and astrology. Servet defended astrology as an art capable of becoming a science and thus of participating in medicine against the criticism of Tagault, who was deeply hostile to what he considered to be superstition. In this period there was a hardening of the Faculty's position towards astrological medicine and the deanship of Jean Tagault was marked by a doctrinal and disciplinary firmness well accepted by his contemporaries. The case was brought before the Parlement of Paris, whose sentence was quite lenient: Servet could continue to study medicine if he showed more respect for his teachers. Tagault resigned as dean in 1538 and devoted himself to surgery.

He became the leader of the faculty's anatomical school where he commented on the works of Guy de Chauliac on which he wrote Metaphrasis in guidonem de Caulacio perhaps in the hope of being appointed royal lecturer in surgery by Francis I but the post was awarded in 1542 to Guido Guidi, a Florentine physician and surgeon.

Tagault then completed his book and published five volumes entitled De chirurgica institutione libri quinque in 1543, published by Chrétien Wechel. His collaborator, Jacques Houllier, then added a sixth volume on surgical subjects.

Tagault continued to devote himself to surgery. His students included Benoît Textor, who became Calvin's doctor, Jacobus Sylvius, with whom he later worked. Shortly before his death, Francis I appointed him doctor of the Conciergerie, but he was never the king's first physician.

Before his death, Tagault entrusted the French translation of his book to Jean Bauhin, a collaborator of Guillaume Rouillé, who was responsible for its publication as part of the francization of medicine initiated by Jean Canappe.

== Works ==
- Tagault, Jean (1537). De purgantibus medicamentis simplicibus libri II (in Latin). Prato: apud Galeotum.
- Taguault Jean, (1543) Metaphrasis in Guidonem de Cauliaco
- Tagaut, Jean; Houllier, Jacques (1543). De chirurgica institutione libri quinque (in Latin). Paris: Christian Wechel. (Republished in several languages.)
