= Robert Constantin =

French lexicographer

Robert Constantin (1530 ?, Caen – 27 December 1605, Montauban) was a 16th-century French physician, hellenist, bibliographer, lexicographer and humanist.

== Biography ==
Robert Constantin studied and practiced the art of medicine and was a pupil of Julius Caesar Scaliger (1484–1558), with whose children he worked in publishing his Poetics (Lyon, 1561). He taught at the University of Caen, where he achieved a reputation as a Hellenist and physician and was alderman of Montauban from 1571, where he died in 1605.

Among other works, especially philological (corrections of Dioscorides, Theophrastus and the De re medica by Celsus, an edition of Hippocrates and others of Ausonius), but also of bibliographic character (composed with Conrad Gesner (1516-1565), the first bibliography published in French soil, the Nomenclator insignium scriptorium, 1555). In lexicography, the Lexicon Graeco-Latinum (1562) was, along the Thesaurus Linguae Graecae by Robert Estienne, one of the most popular dictionaries for many centuries, whose composition was helped by Jean Crespin. The monumental second edition, 1592, was extended by Franciscus Portus (1511-1581) with important appendices.

== Works ==
- With Conrad Gesner, Nomenclator insignium scriptorum quorum libri extant vel manuscripti vel impressi ex bibliothecis Galliae et Angliae, indexque totius Bibliothecae atque Pandectarum Paris, André Wechel, 1555.
- Annotationes et correctiones lemmatum in Dioscoridem (1558)
- Annotationes et correctiones in C. Celsum (1566)
- Annotationes in historias Theophrasti (1584)
- Aphorismi Hippocratis versibus Graecis et Latinis
- Tratado de Antigüedades griegas y latinas .
- Lexicon Graeco-Latinum, 1562, 2.ª ed. 1592.
- Commentarii et animadversiones in sex libros Plantarum Theophrasti de Julius Caesar Scaliger, 1566.

== Bibliography ==
- Michel Magnien, "Robert Constantin, éditeur de Jules César Scaliger", Esculape et Dionysos. Mélanges en l'honneur de Jean Céard, Genève, Droz, 2008, p. 1045-1063.
