= R. J. Tarrant =

American classical scholar

Richard Tarrant

Academic background
- Education: Fordham University; Corpus Christi College, Oxford
- Doctoral advisor: Robin Nisbet

Academic work
- Discipline: Latin Literature
- Sub-discipline: Textual Criticism
- Institutions: University of Toronto; Harvard University

Richard John Tarrant is an American classicist and emeritus Pope Professor of Latin at Harvard University. He is an expert on the textual criticism and the transmission of Latin poetry.

== Career ==
A native of Brooklyn, Tarrant was educated at Fordham University, where he obtained a BA in 1966. He then moved to Oxford University and graduated with a DPhil from Corpus Christi College (1972).

From 1970, he taught at the University of Toronto, taking up a position at Harvard University in 1982. In his time at the department, he served as its chairman (1988–94) and as the acting Dean of the Harvard Graduate School of Arts and Sciences (1995–6).

Tarrant has held visiting fellowships at the Institute for Advanced Study and Corpus Christi College, Oxford.

== Selected publications ==
- Seneca: Agamemnon, Cambridge, 1977.
- P. Ovidi Nasonis: Metamorphoses, Oxford, 2004.
- Virgil: Aeneid Book XII, Cambridge, 2012.
- Texts, Editors, and Readers: Methods and Problems in Latin Textual Criticism, Cambridge, 2016.

== Works cited ==
- Oakley, S. P. (2016) Review of Tarrant (2016), Journal of Roman Studies 106, 360–1.
- Tarrant, R. J. (2016) Texts, Editors, and Readers: Methods and Problems in Latin Textual Criticism, Cambridge.
