= John C. Hodges Library =

Main library of the University of Tennessee, Knoxville

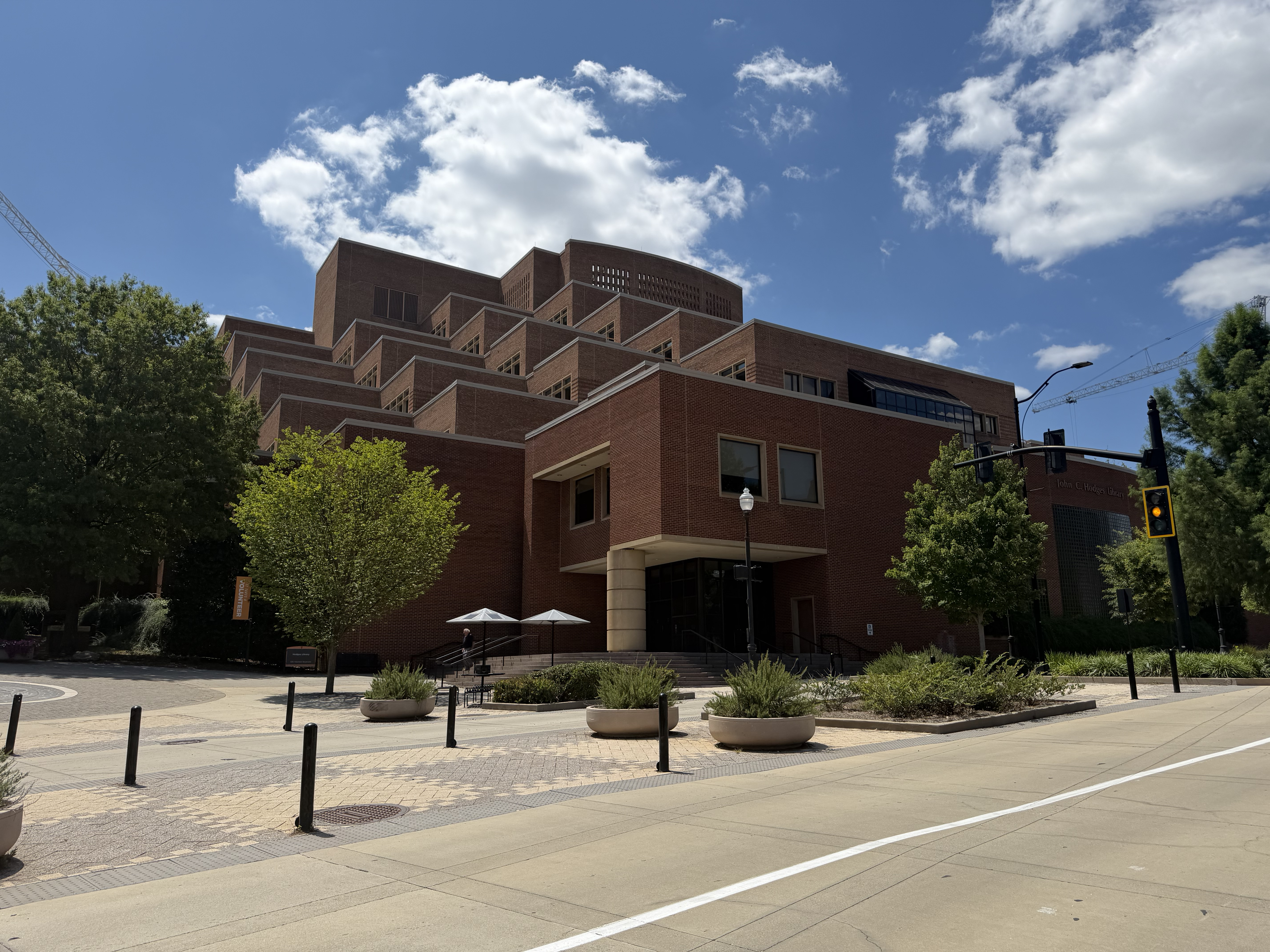
- Southeastern view of John C. Hodges Library, with its ziggurat-like structure, in July 2026.
- 35.95527485968721°N 83.92929143310987°W
- Location: Knoxville, Tennessee, United States
- Type: Academic library
- Established: 1969

Other information
- Affiliation: University of Tennessee
- Website: https://www.lib.utk.edu/

The John C. Hodges Library is the main library of the University of Tennessee. Located at 1015 Volunteer Boulevard, it is one of many libraries the University of Tennessee houses.

== History ==
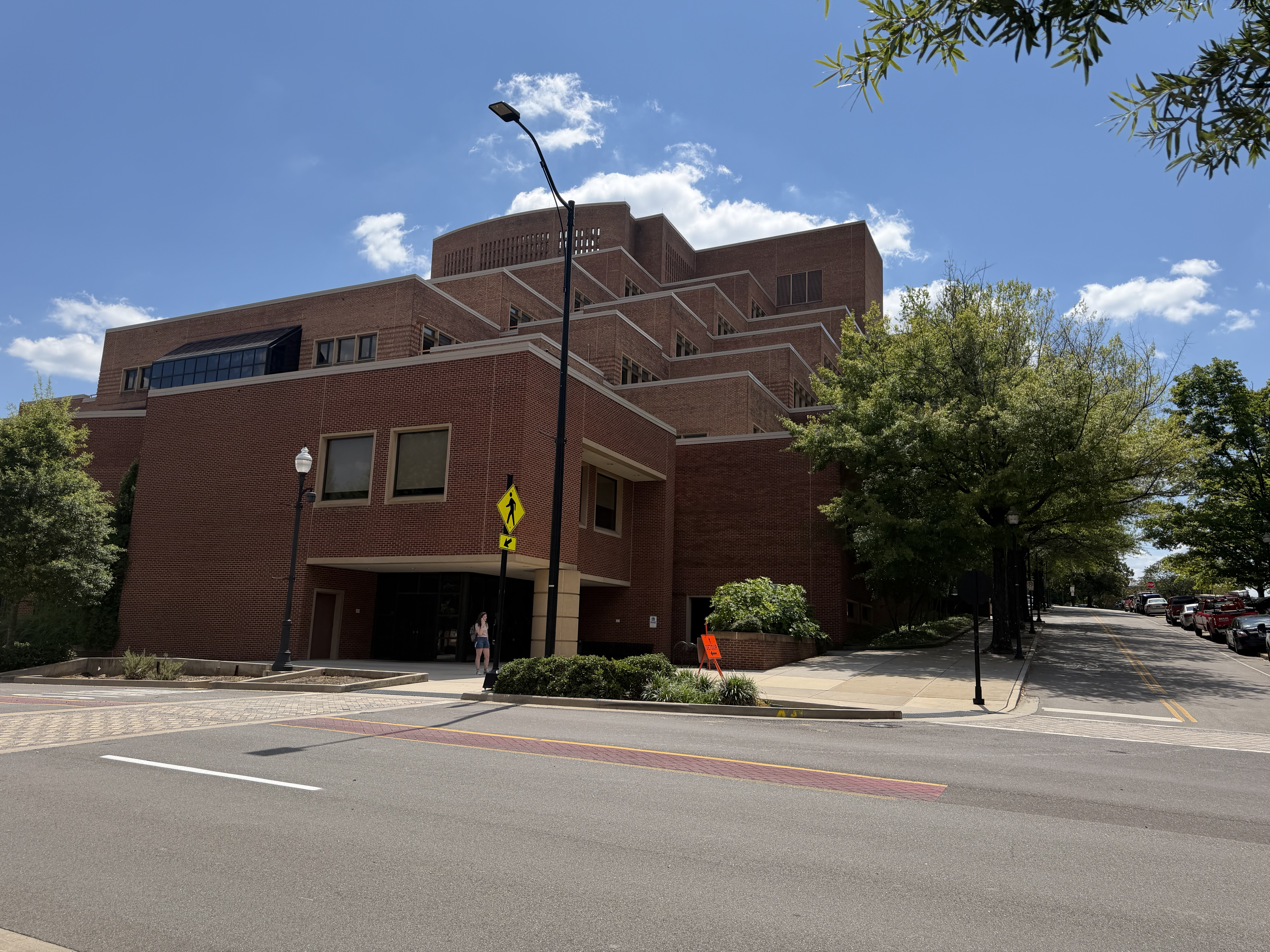
The northeast exterior of the library in July 2026.

Opened in 1969, the library houses 3 million library volumes, periodicals, and computer resources. Its rare book collection numbers about 60,000 items, the oldest dating from 1481 AD. The University of Tennessee Libraries provides books, articles, media, technology, spaces, and research expertise.

In 2010–2011, the library was ranked 48 out of 115 of the top North American research libraries of the United States according to the Chronicle of Higher Education rankings. It ranks 48th among all major academic research libraries in Canada and the U.S. by the Association of Research Libraries.

== Administration ==
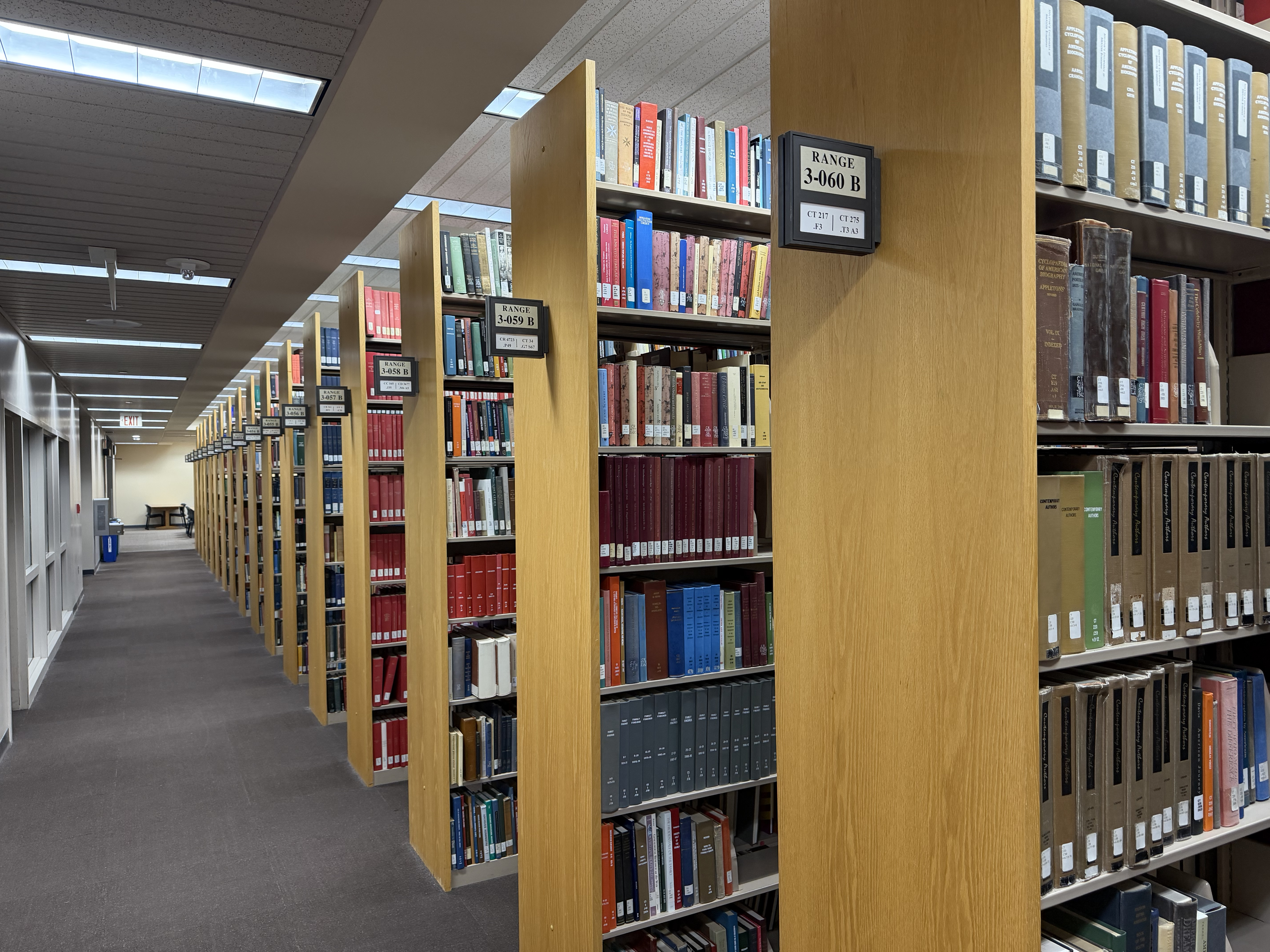
Bookshelves on the library's third floor in July 2026.

The current administration of the John C. Hodges Library consists of:

- Steven Smith, Dean of Libraries
- Rita Smith, Executive Associate Dean (retired)
- Sandy Leach, Associate Dean for Collections (retired)
- Holly Mercer, Associate Dean for Research and Scholarly Communication
- Teresa Walker, Associate Dean for Learning, Research, and Engagement

== Namesake ==
The library's name acknowledges the contributions of Dr. John Cunyus Hodges (b. March 15, 1892 – d. July 7, 1967), a professor of English and a benefactor of the University of Tennessee libraries. Hodges worked at UT for 41 years (1921 – 1962) and was the author of the Harbrace Handbook, often said to be the most widely used college text in the country.

== Collections ==
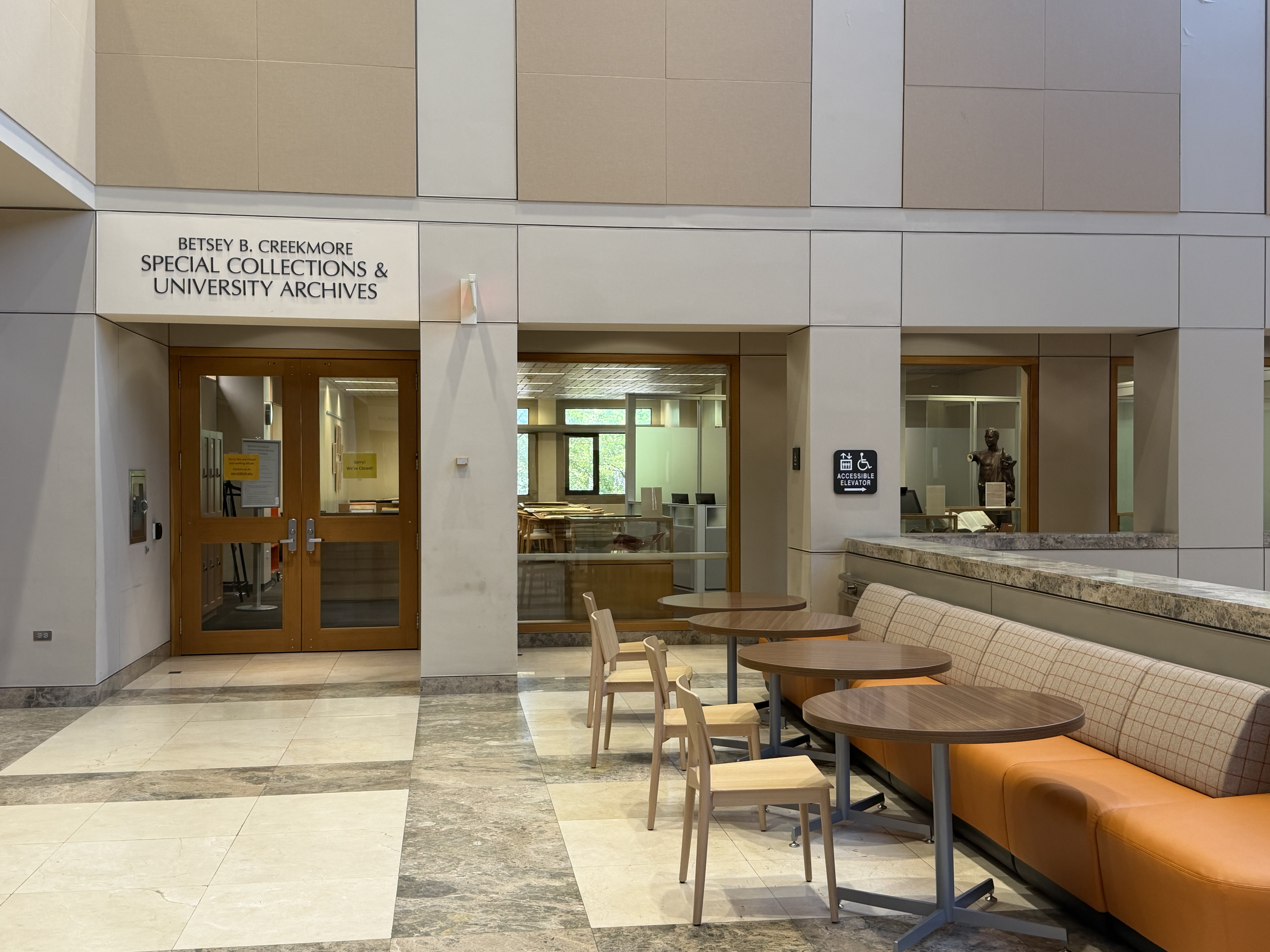
The Betsey B. Creekmore Special Collections and University Archives on the library's first floor in July 2026.

Its special collections department includes notable collections such as the writings of James Agee and Alex Haley, as well as film director Clarence Brown. Materials in the special collections department do not circulate, so researchers wishing to study them must request the materials for viewing in the Special Collections Reading Room. The materials in the special collections department can be found using SCOUT (Special Collections Online at the University of Tennessee) or the library catalog. Renovations for additional space to the Special Collections began in late 2015 and will be completed in 2016.

== Exhibits ==
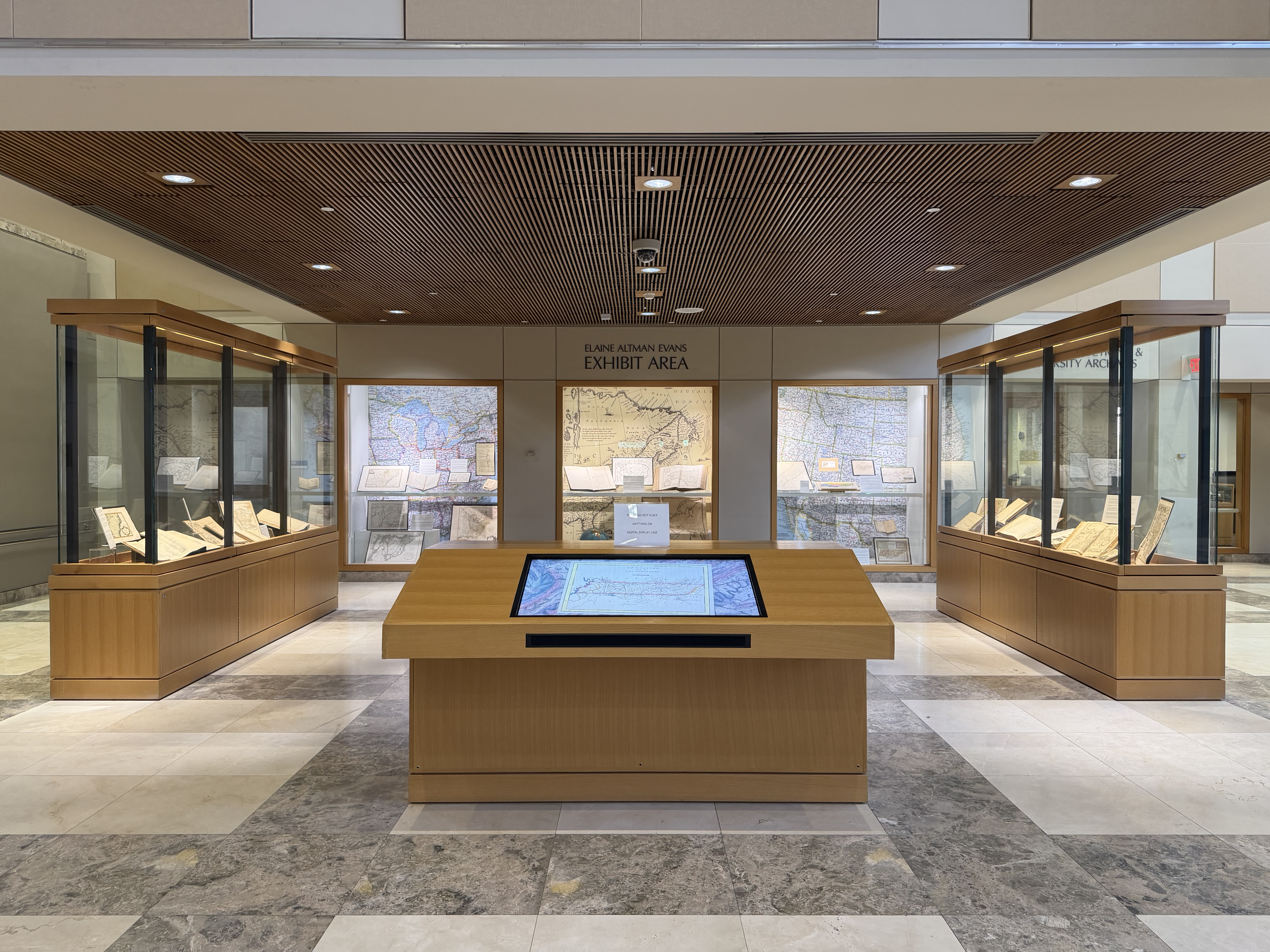
The Elaine Altman Evans Exhibit Area on the library's first floor in July 2026.

The first floor galleria of Hodges Library holds several permanent exhibits of interest, including a bronze bust of the late author Alex Haley and the Alumni Academic Hall of Fame honors UT alumni.

The second floor of John C. Hodges Library houses The Commons. This collaborative space between the Office of Information Technology and the University Libraries provides students with tools which include a media production lab, research assistance, group meeting spaces, and technology services.

The John C. Hodges Library houses a media production lab known as "The Studio." The Studio, located in room 235, is a resource for students, staff, and faculty that wish to work on production and media activities.

The Center for Children's & Young Adult Literature is on the third floor of Hodges. The CCYAL maintains and promotes a non-circulating collection of children's and young adult literature that the community is encouraged to come in and read on-site.

Additionally, the third floor houses the Children's and Young Adult Collection. The items in this collection circulate.

The building of Hodges library is lofty. The interior is designed to admit ample natural light and features Italian and Spanish marble and lightly finished woods. The terraced effect of the library belies the building's massive size. The library was expanded in 1987 using the original 1969 construction and adding almost 250,000 more square feet.

== Gallery ==
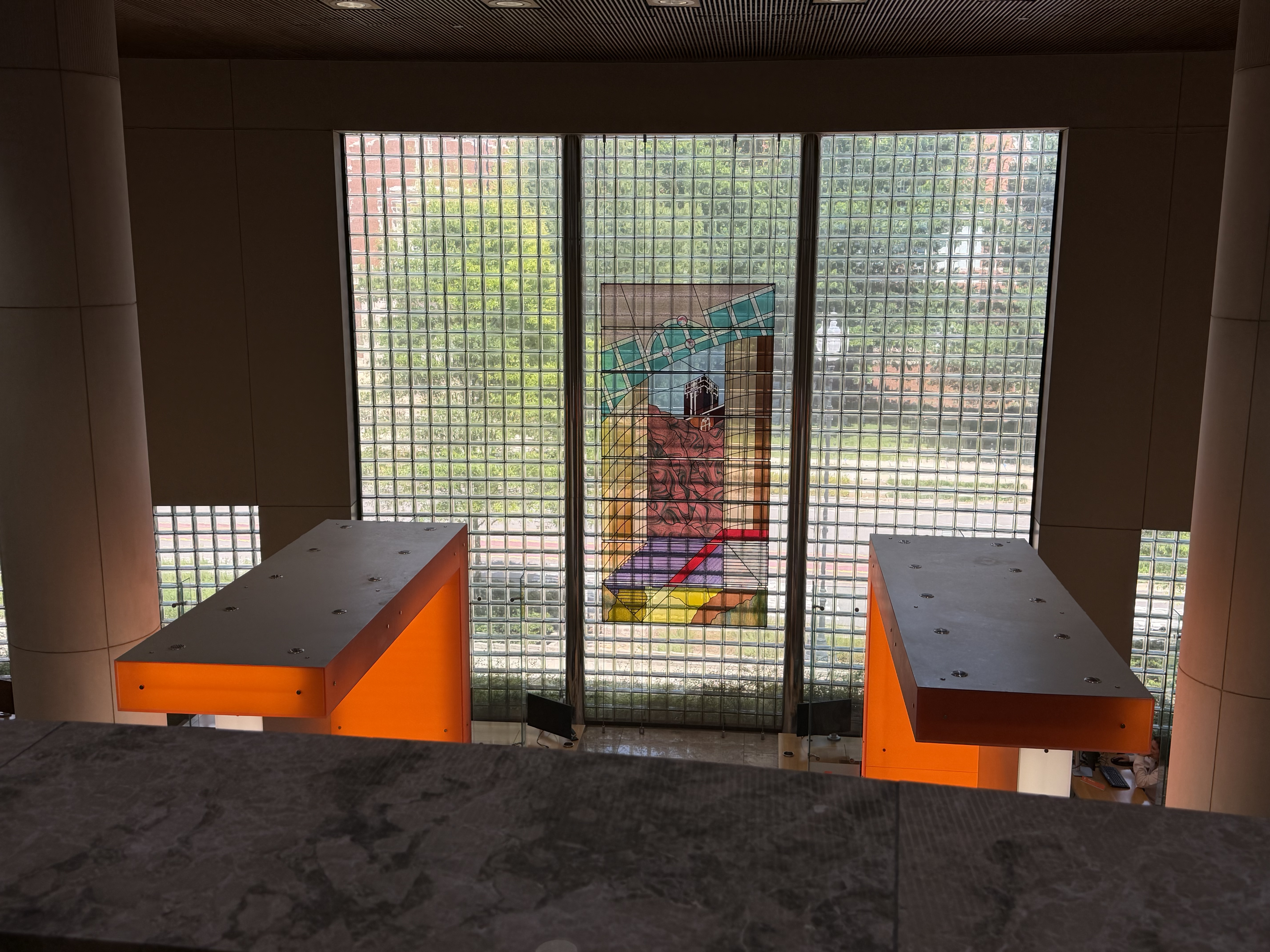
Stained glass in the interior of the library's ground floor in July 2026.

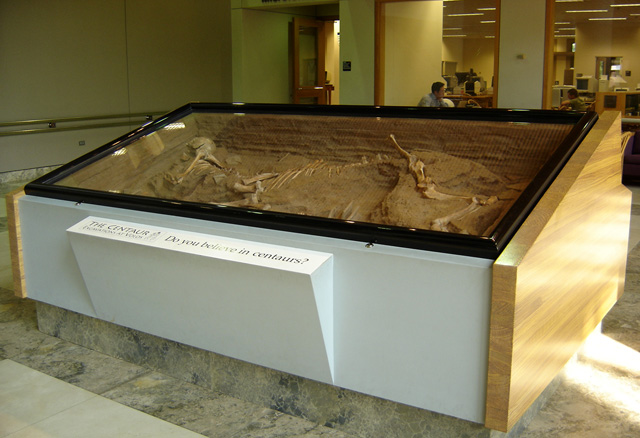
The Centaur from Volos, on display on the library's first floor, in August 2005.
