= Bronze man and centaur (Metropolitan Museum of Art) =

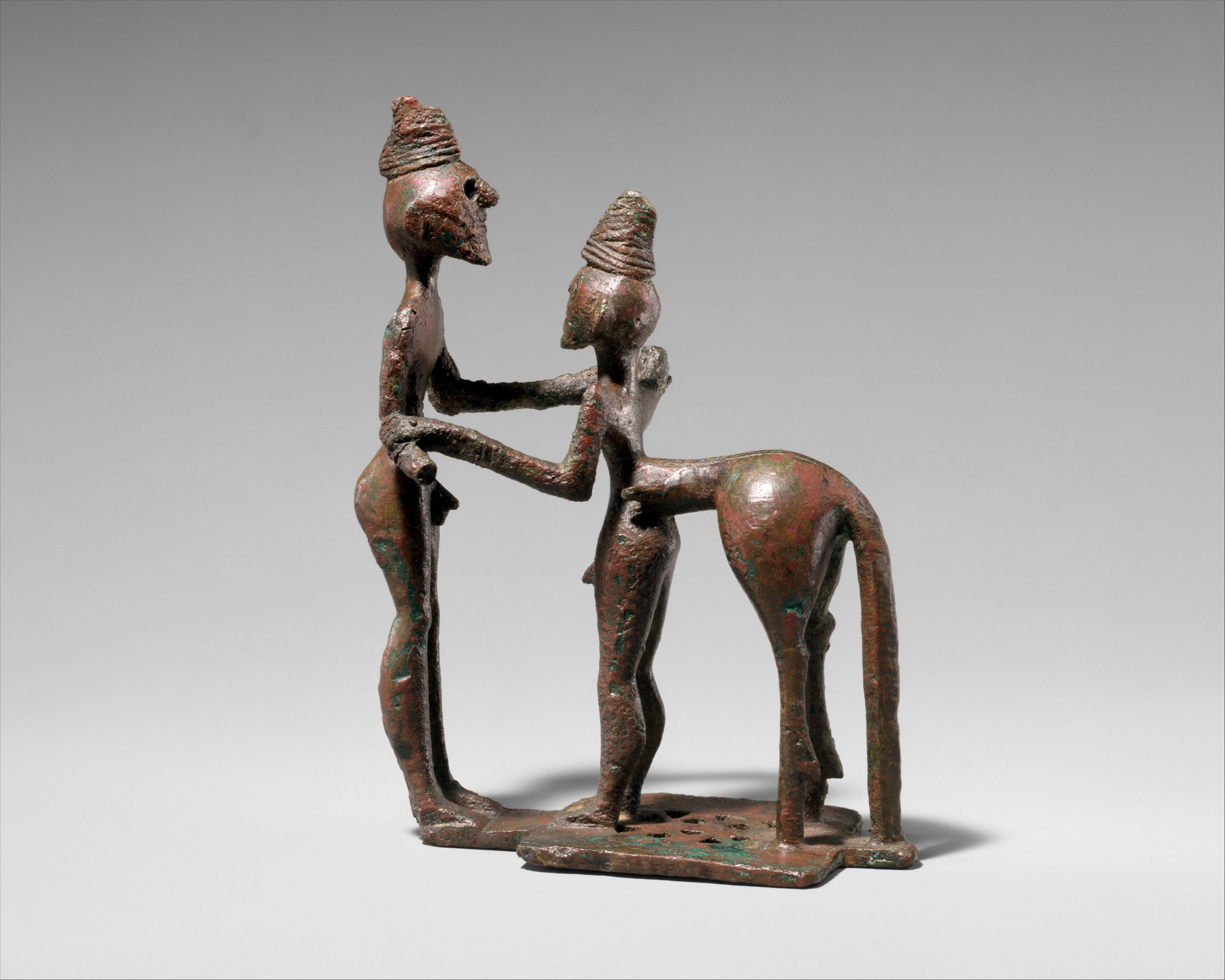
- Year: 8th century BCE (Julian)
- Medium: bronze
- Location: Metropolitan Museum of Art
- Accession: 17.190.2072

Bronze Man and Centaur is an 8th century BC bronze sculpture, created in Greece during the late Geometric Period. It is now in the collection of the Metropolitan Museum of Art.

The sculpture was a posthumous gift of J. Pierpont Morgan given to the Metropolitan Museum in 1917.

== Description ==
This small bronze sculpture depicts a man and centaur stiffly locked in combat, standing on a platform containing a zigzag geometric pattern, possibly representing water. The statue is only 4 3/8 inches tall (11.10 cm) and was made in one piece using the lost-wax casting method. The eye sockets of the figures were each originally inlaid with different metals, (silver for the man and iron for the centaur), but the additional pieces have since been lost.

Zigzag geometric pattern on the base of the sculpture. Possibly represents them standing on or nearby water or a river.

The figures of the man and centaur are made up of very geometric shapes, emphasizing certain commonly represented artistic canons of this period. The man's upside down triangle torso draws contrast between his broad shoulders and thin waist, while his legs swell in cylinders where ideal muscles would be. The man's chin, nose, and other facial features are sharp and stylized. The man fighting only wears a hat and belt, further accentuating the desired simplicity in details of the Geometric style. The centaur's structure is similarly represented with rounded muscles and straight limbs.

== Use and Interpretation ==
It has been suggested that this work was used as a votive offering, said to have been found at Olympia, Greece, where a large sanctuary to the ancient Greek god Zeus was built (this sanctuary includes the Temple of Zeus). During this time, it was possible that many makers and craftsmen had shops located near this religious sanctuary and crafted sculptures and items that could then be sold to the many people who visited for worship. This sculpture was potentially one of the many created and sold to be used in votive practices here.

=== Subject ===
In this combat scene, though pieces have broken off, it can be seen that the man and the centaur are stiffly holding each other. The centaur's left hand strongly grabs the man's right arm and his face is tilted upwards towards his opponent, leaving the two figures at a seemingly equal point in the battle. However, upon closer inspection, a rectangular object can be seen lodged in the centaur's left side, presumably being a spear head or sword from the man's hand. It is possible that the centaur also held his own weapon in his right hand, but this is unconfirmed due to the observed breakage.

While the true identities of the figures are unknown, there is speculation on who this sculpture may be based off. One hypothesis suggests that the dominance asserted by the man aligns with the status of him being a hero, possibly from a popular Greek myth where the hero Heracles is fighting a centaur, Nessus, in a river after his wife was abducted by the creature. Throughout this time period, Greek myths were slowly becoming more and more consistently told, so it is possible that this sculpture is a representation of a common story during the piece's time of creation.

Despite the cloudiness surrounding the figures' true identities, it is clear that the man is likely to be the victor of the battle after delivering a harmful blow to the centaur. The overall message being conveyed through this sculpture is that of the triumph that comes with having a strong civilization. The half-wild beast and brutality of the centaur was a common enemy of all admirable heroes in Greek myths, creating a message to the people that uncivilized nature and societies could easily be taken control of by using the Greek power and cultural advancement. The simplicity of this scene, devoid of any distracting elements, is able to deliver a clear message frequently shown in art during this time period.
