= Centaur =

Greek mythological creature

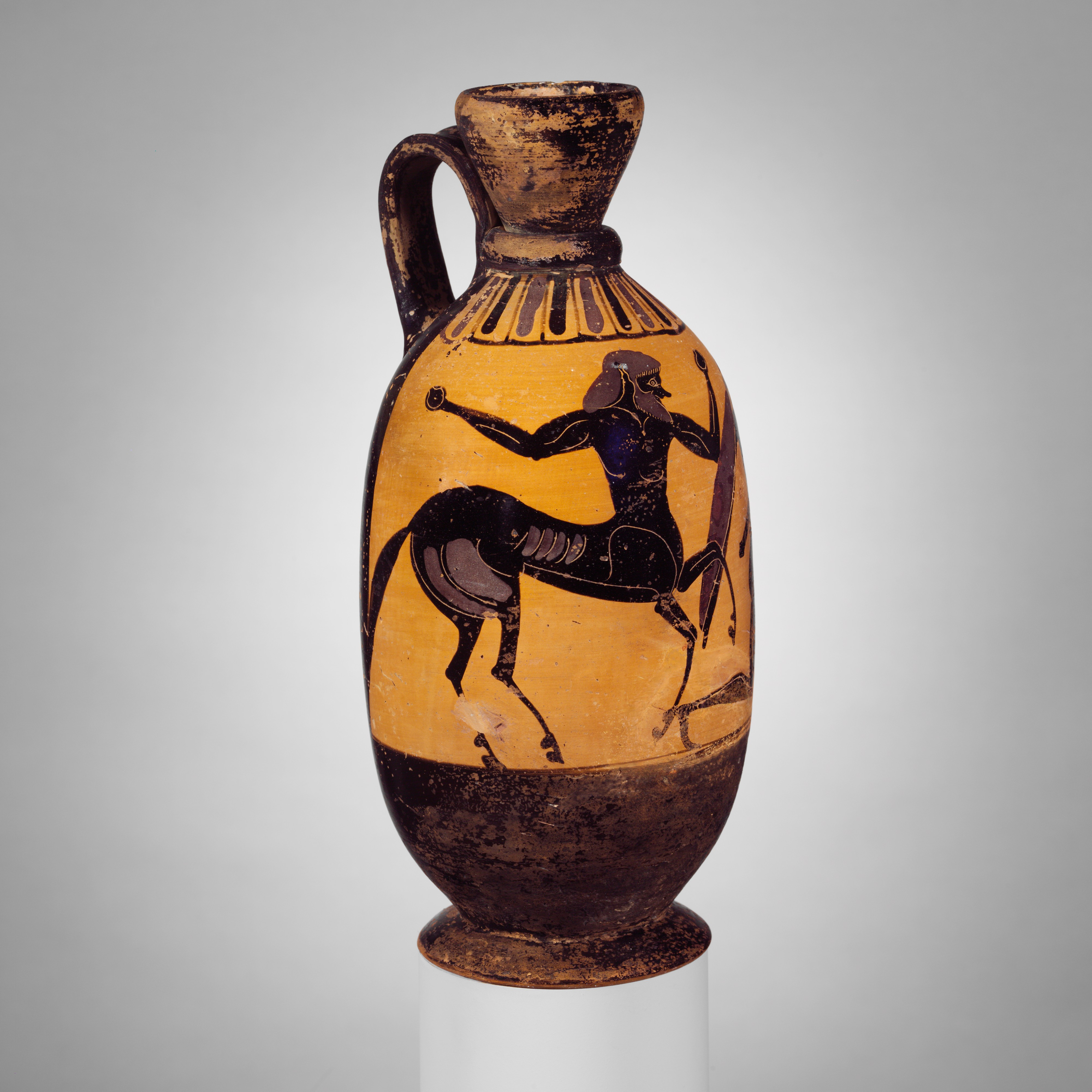
- Centaur in battle, on an Attic terracotta lekythos, c. 575–550 BC

Creature information
- Other name(s): Kentaur, Centaurus, Sagittary
- Grouping: Legendary creature
- Sub grouping: Hybrid
- Similar entities: Minotaur, satyr, harpy
- Folklore: Greek

Origin
- Region: Greece, Cyprus
- Habitat: Land

A centaur (/ˈsɛntɔːr, ˈsɛntɑːr/ SEN-tor, SEN-tar; Ancient Greek: κένταυρος, romanized: kéntauros; Latin: centaurus), occasionally hippocentaur, collectively called the Centaurs or the Ixionidae (Ancient Greek: Ἰξιονίδαι, romanized: Ixionídai, lit. 'sons of Ixion'), is a creature from Greek mythology with the upper body of a human and the lower body and legs of a horse that was said to live in the mountains of Thessaly. In one version of the myth, the centaurs were named after Centaurus, and, through his brother Lapithes, were kin to the legendary tribe of the Lapiths.

Centaurs are thought of in many Greek myths as being as wild as untamed horses, and were said to have inhabited the region of Magnesia and Mount Pelion in Thessaly, the Foloi oak forest in Elis, and the Malean peninsula in southern Laconia. Centaurs are subsequently featured in Roman mythology, and were familiar figures in the medieval bestiary. They remain a staple of modern fantastic literature.

== Etymology ==
The Greek word kentauros is of obscure origin. The etymology from ken + tauros, 'piercing bull', was a euhemerist suggestion in Palaephatus' rationalizing text on Greek mythology, On Incredible Tales (Περὶ ἀπίστων), which included mounted archers from a village called Nephele eliminating a herd of bulls that were the scourge of Ixion's kingdom. Another proposed etymology was "bull-killer". Proposed Semitic etymologies are far-fetched.

== Mythology ==
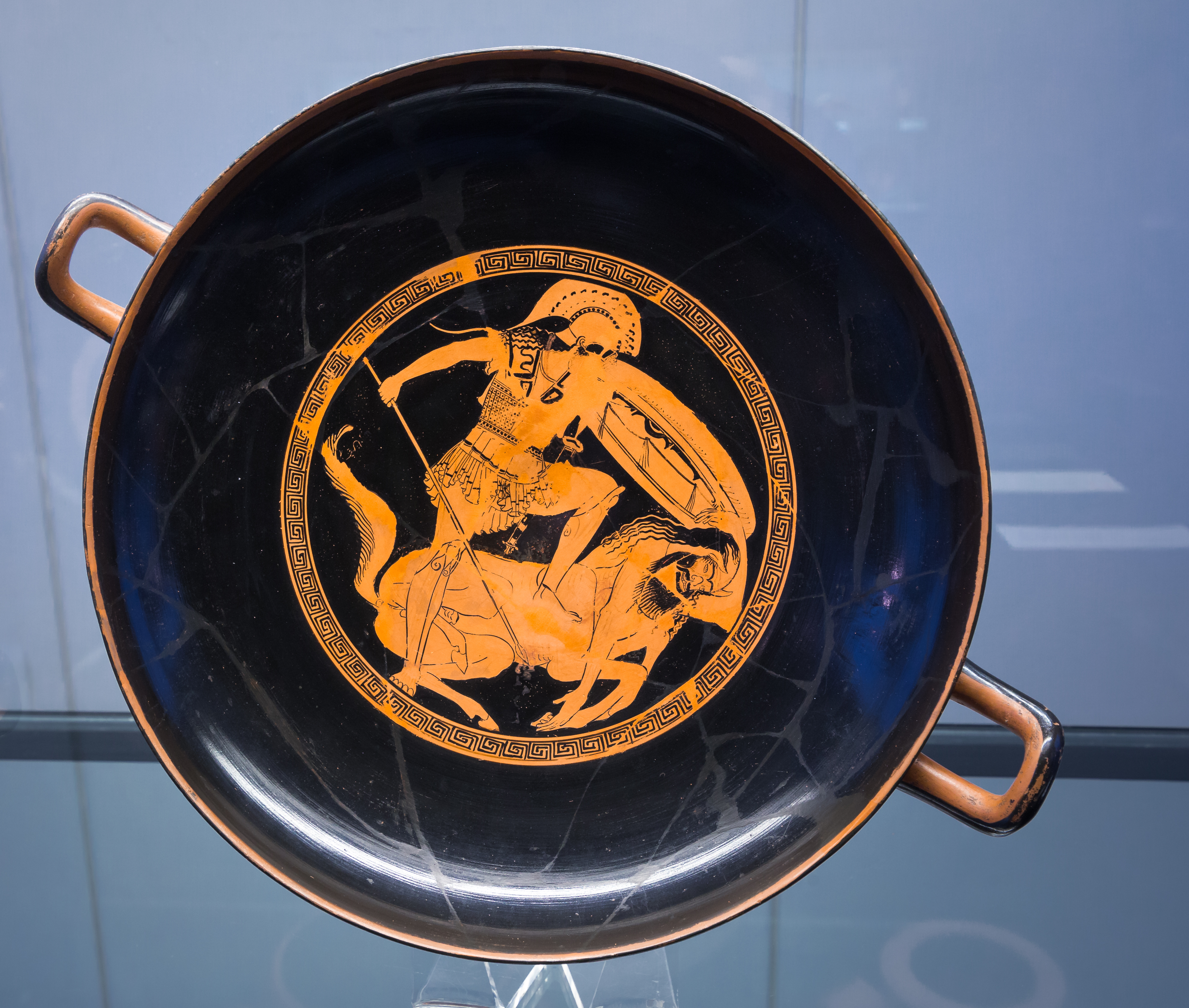
Centauromachy, tondo of an Attic red-figure kylix, c. 480 BC

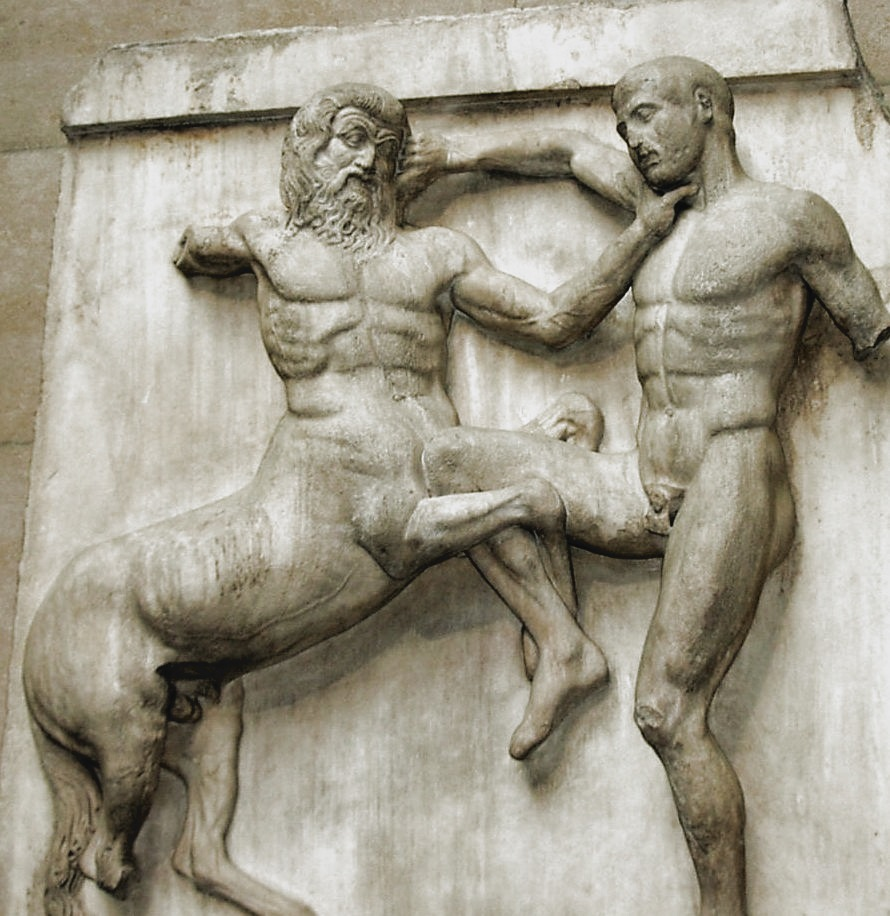
Centaur in battle with a Lapith, on South Metope 31 of the Parthenon, c. 447–438 BC

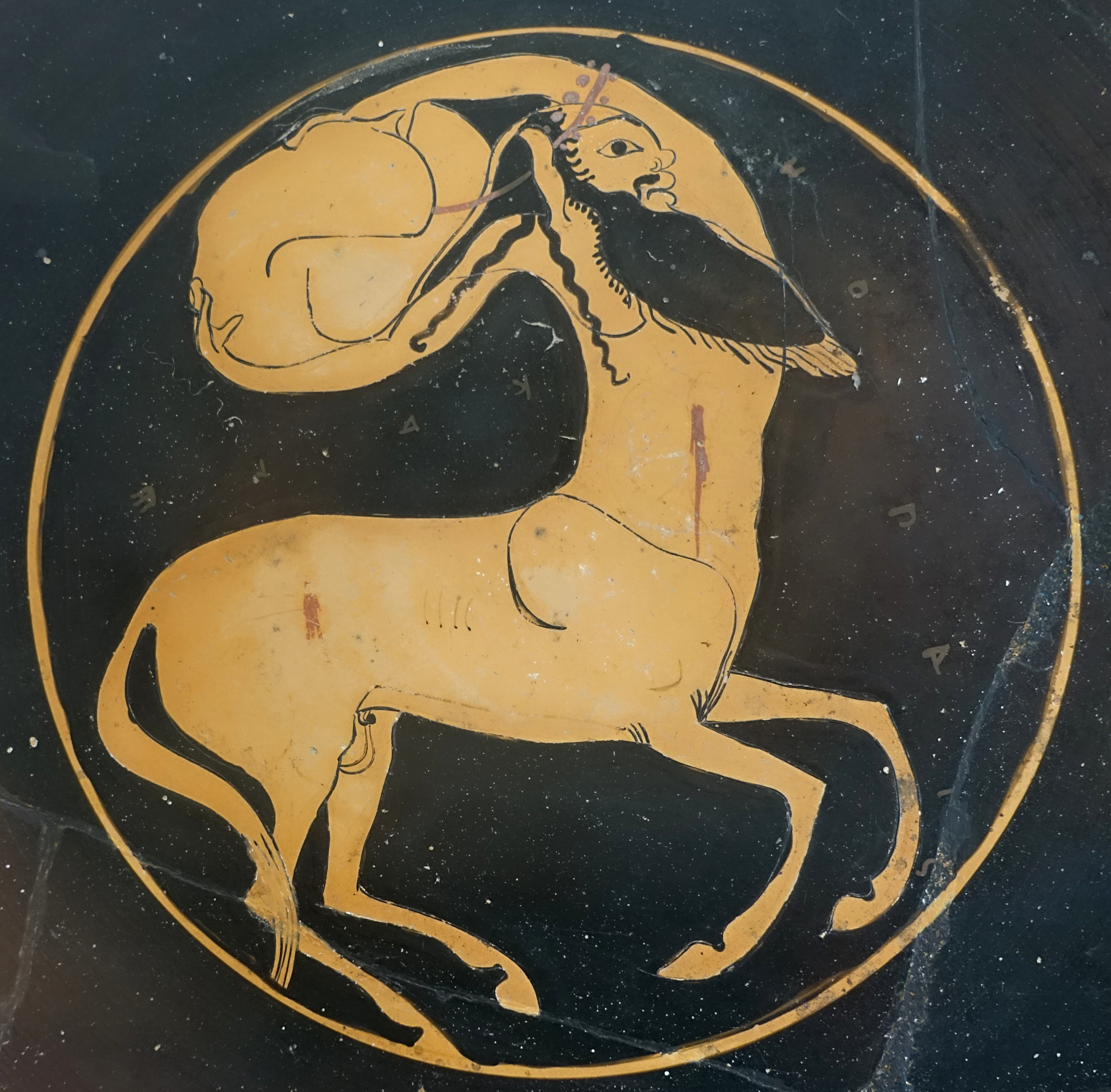
Centaur carrying a boulder, Attic red-figured kylix, c. 510–500 BC

=== Creation of centaurs ===
The centaurs were usually said to have been born of Ixion and Nephele. As the story goes, Nephele was a cloud made into the likeness of Hera in a plot to trick Ixion into revealing his lust for Hera to Zeus. Ixion seduced Nephele and from that relationship centaurs were created. Another version, however, makes them children of Centaurus, a deformed man who mated with the Magnesian mares. Centaurus was either himself the son of Ixion and Nephele (inserting an additional generation) or of Apollo and the nymph Stilbe. In the latter version of the story, Centaurus's twin brother was Lapithes, ancestor of the Lapiths.

Another tribe of centaurs was said to have lived on Cyprus. According to Nonnus, the Cyprian Centaurs were fathered by Zeus, who, in frustration after Aphrodite had eluded him, spilled his seed on the ground of that land. Unlike those of mainland Greece, the Cyprian centaurs were ox-horned.

There were also the Lamian Pheres, twelve rustic daimones (spirits) of the Lamos river. They were set by Zeus to guard the infant Dionysus, protecting him from the machinations of Hera, but the enraged goddess transformed them into ox-horned Centaurs unrelated to the Cyprian Centaurs. The Lamian Pheres later accompanied Dionysus in his campaign against the Indians.

The centaur's half-human, half-horse composition has led many writers to treat them as liminal beings, caught between the two natures they embody in contrasting myths; they are both the embodiment of untamed nature, as in their battle with the Lapiths (their kin), and conversely, teachers like Chiron. They are often depicted as wild, untamed, virile, lascivious, and displaying great feats of strength such as carrying rocks or boulders.

=== Centauromachy ===
The Centaurs are best known for their fight with the Lapiths who, according to one origin myth, would have been cousins to the centaurs. The battle, called the Centauromachy, was caused by the centaurs' attempt to carry off Hippodamia and the rest of the Lapith women on the day of Hippodamia's marriage to Pirithous, who was the king of the Lapithae and a son of Ixion. Theseus, a hero and founder of cities, who happened to be present, threw the balance in favour of the Lapiths by assisting Pirithous in the battle. The Centaurs were driven off or destroyed. Another Lapith hero, Caeneus, who was invulnerable to weapons, was beaten into the earth by Centaurs wielding rocks and the branches of trees. In her article "The Centaur: Its History and Meaning in Human Culture", Elizabeth Lawrence claims that the contests between the centaurs and the Lapiths typify the struggle between civilization and barbarism. The Centauromachy is most famously portrayed in the metopes of the Parthenon by Phidias and in the Battle of the Centaurs, a relief by Michelangelo.

== Origin of the myth ==
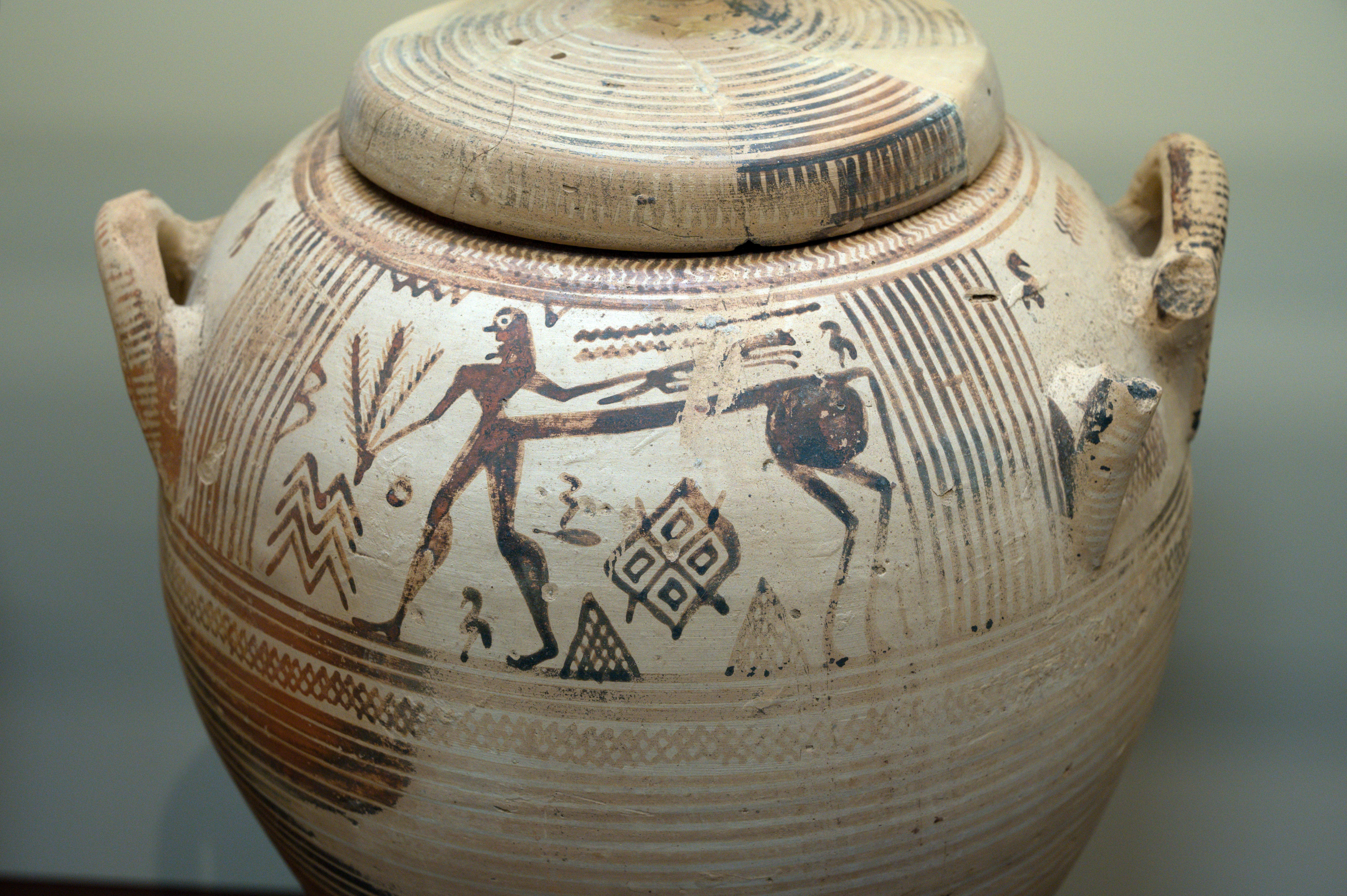
Centaur on Boeotian pottery from the Geometric period (c. 900–700 BC)

The most common theory holds that the idea of centaurs came from the first reaction of a non-riding culture, as in the Minoan Aegean world, to nomads who were mounted on horses. The theory suggests that such riders would appear as half-man, half-animal. Bernal Díaz del Castillo reported that the Aztecs also had this misapprehension about Spanish cavalrymen. The Lapith tribe of Thessaly, who were the kinsmen of the Centaurs in myth, were described as the inventors of horse-riding by Greek writers. The Thessalian tribes also claimed their horse breeds were descended from the centaurs.

Robert Graves (relying on the work of Georges Dumézil, who argued for tracing the centaurs back to the Indian Gandharva), speculated that the centaurs were a dimly remembered, pre-Hellenic fraternal earth cult who had the horse as a totem. A similar theory was incorporated into Mary Renault's The Bull from the Sea.

== Variations ==
=== Female centaurs ===
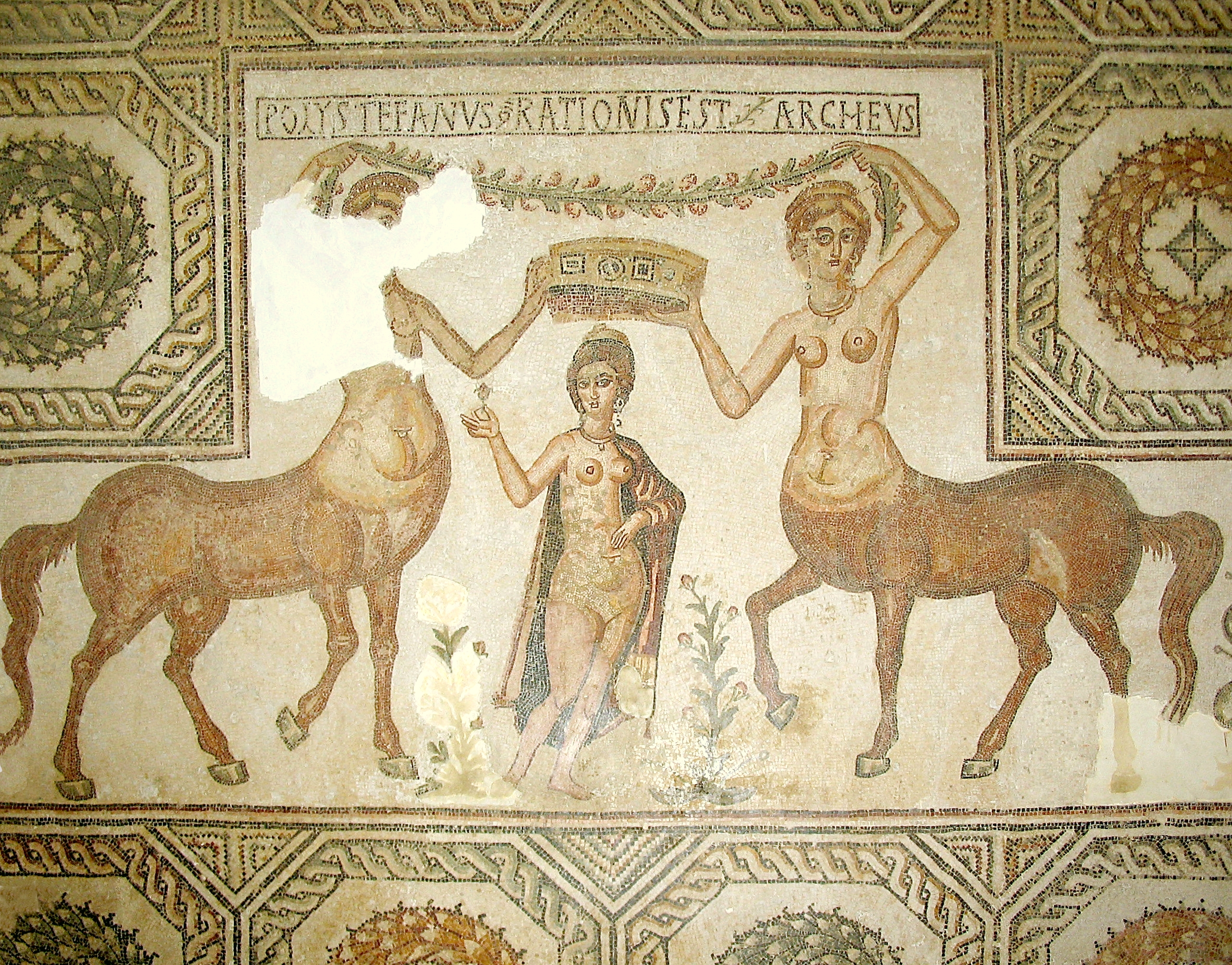
Female centaurs flanking Venus (Mosaic from Roman Tunisia, 2nd century AD)

Though female centaurs, called centaurides or centauresses, are not mentioned in early Greek literature and art, they do appear occasionally in later antiquity. A Macedonian mosaic of the 4th century BC is one of the earliest examples of the centauress in art. Ovid also mentions a centauress named Hylonome (Note: The name Hylonome is Greek, so Ovid may have drawn her story from an earlier Greek writer.) who committed suicide when her husband Cyllarus was killed in the war with the Lapiths.

=== India ===
The Kalibangan cylinder seal, dated to around 2600–1900 BC and found at an archeological site of the Indus Valley civilization shows a battle between men in the presence of centaur-like creatures. Other sources claim the creatures represented are actually half human and half tigers, later evolving into the Hindu Goddess of War. These seals are also evidence of Indus-Mesopotamia relations in the 3rd millennium BC.

In a popular legend associated with Pazhaya Sreekanteswaram Temple in Thiruvananthapuram, the curse of a saintly Brahmin transformed a handsome Yadava prince into a creature having a horse's body and the prince's head, arms, and torso in place of the head and neck of the horse.

Kinnaras, another half-man, half-horse mythical creature from Indian mythology, appeared in various ancient texts, arts, and sculptures from all around India. It is shown as a horse with the torso of a man where the horse's head would be, and is similar to a Greek centaur.

=== Russia ===
A centaur-like half-human, half-equine creature called Polkan appeared in Russian folk art and lubok prints of the 17th–19th centuries. Polkan is originally based on Pulicane, a half-dog from Andrea da Barberino's poem I Reali di Francia, which was once popular in the Slavonic world in prose translations.

== Artistic representations ==
=== Classical art ===
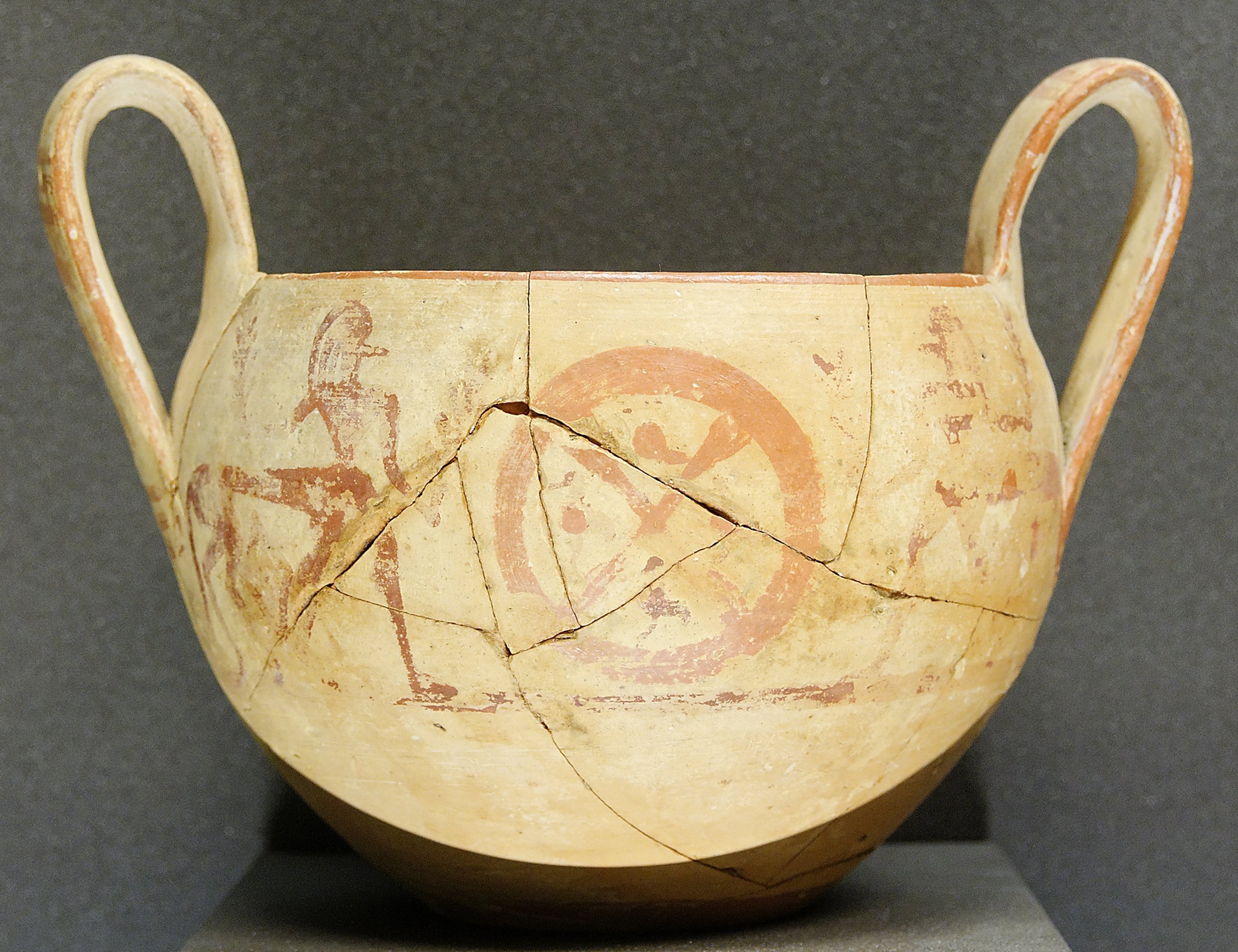
Boeotian kantharos, Late Geometric period

The extensive Mycenaean pottery found at Ugarit included two fragmentary Mycenaean terracotta figures which have been tentatively identified as centaurs. This finding suggests a Bronze Age origin for these creatures of myth. A painted terracotta centaur was found in the "Hero's tomb" at Lefkandi, and by the Geometric period, centaurs figure among the first representational figures painted on Greek pottery. An often-published Geometric period bronze of a warrior face-to-face with a centaur is at the Metropolitan Museum of Art.

In Greek art of the Archaic period, centaurs are depicted in three different forms.

- Some centaurs are depicted with a human torso attached to the body of a horse at the withers, where the horse's neck would be; this form, designated "Class A" by Professor Paul Baur, later became standard.
- "Class B" centaurs are depicted with a human body and legs joined at the waist to the hindquarters of a horse; in some cases centaurs of both Class A and Class B appear together.
- A third type, designated "Class C", depicts centaurs with human forelegs terminating in hooves. Baur describes this as an apparent development of Aeolic art, which never became particularly widespread.

There are also paintings and motifs on amphorae and Dipylon cups which depict winged centaurs.

Centaurs were also frequently depicted in Roman art. One example is the pair of centaurs drawing the chariot of Constantine the Great and his family in the Great Cameo of Constantine (circa AD 314–16), which embodies wholly pagan imagery, and contrasts sharply with the popular image of Constantine as the patron of early Christianity.

=== Medieval art ===
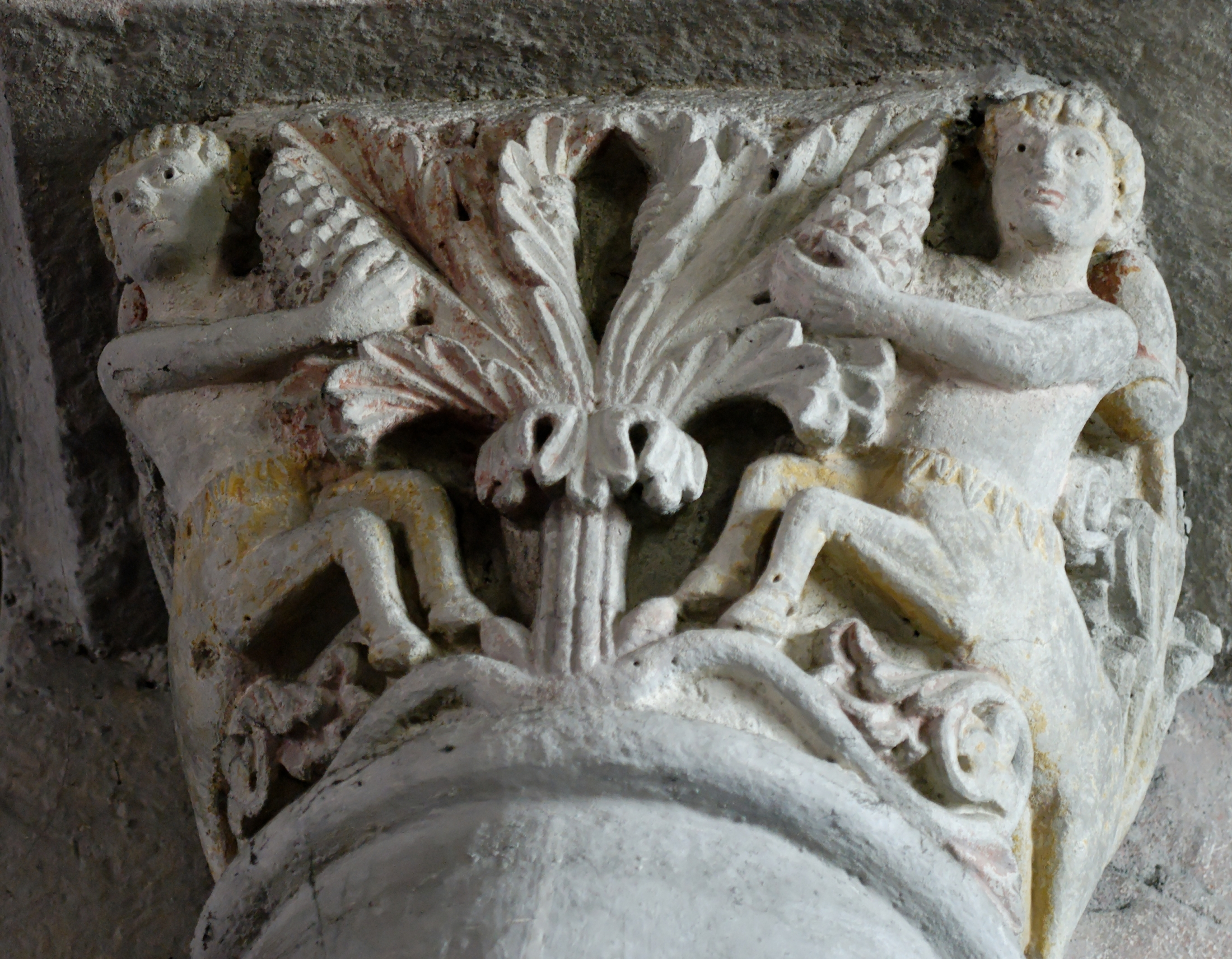
Centaurs harvest grapes on a 12th-century capital from the Mozac Abbey in the Auvergne

Centaurs preserved a Dionysian connection in the 12th-century Romanesque carved capitals of Mozac Abbey in the Auvergne. Other similar capitals depict harvesters, boys riding goats (a further Dionysiac theme), and griffins guarding the chalice that held the wine. Centaurs are also shown on a number of Pictish carved stones from north-east Scotland erected in the 8th–9th centuries AD (e.g., at Meigle, Perthshire). Though outside the limits of the Roman Empire, these depictions appear to be derived from Classical prototypes.

=== Modern art ===
The John C. Hodges library at The University of Tennessee hosts a permanent exhibit of a "Centaur from Volos" in its library. The exhibit, made by sculptor Bill Willers by combining a study human skeleton with the skeleton of a Shetland pony, is entitled "Do you believe in Centaurs?". According to the exhibitors, it was meant to mislead students in order to make them more critically aware.

=== Cartography ===
Depictions of centaurs in a mythical land located south beyond the world's known continents appear on a map by Urbano Monti from 1587, sometimes called Monti's Planisphere.

=== In heraldry ===
Centaurs are common in European heraldry, although more frequent in continental than in British arms. A centaur holding a bow is referred to as a sagittary or sagittarius. The arms attributed to Stephen, King of England featured three lion-centaur sagittaries, and from this depiction he became known as "The Sagittary of London Park."

== Literature ==
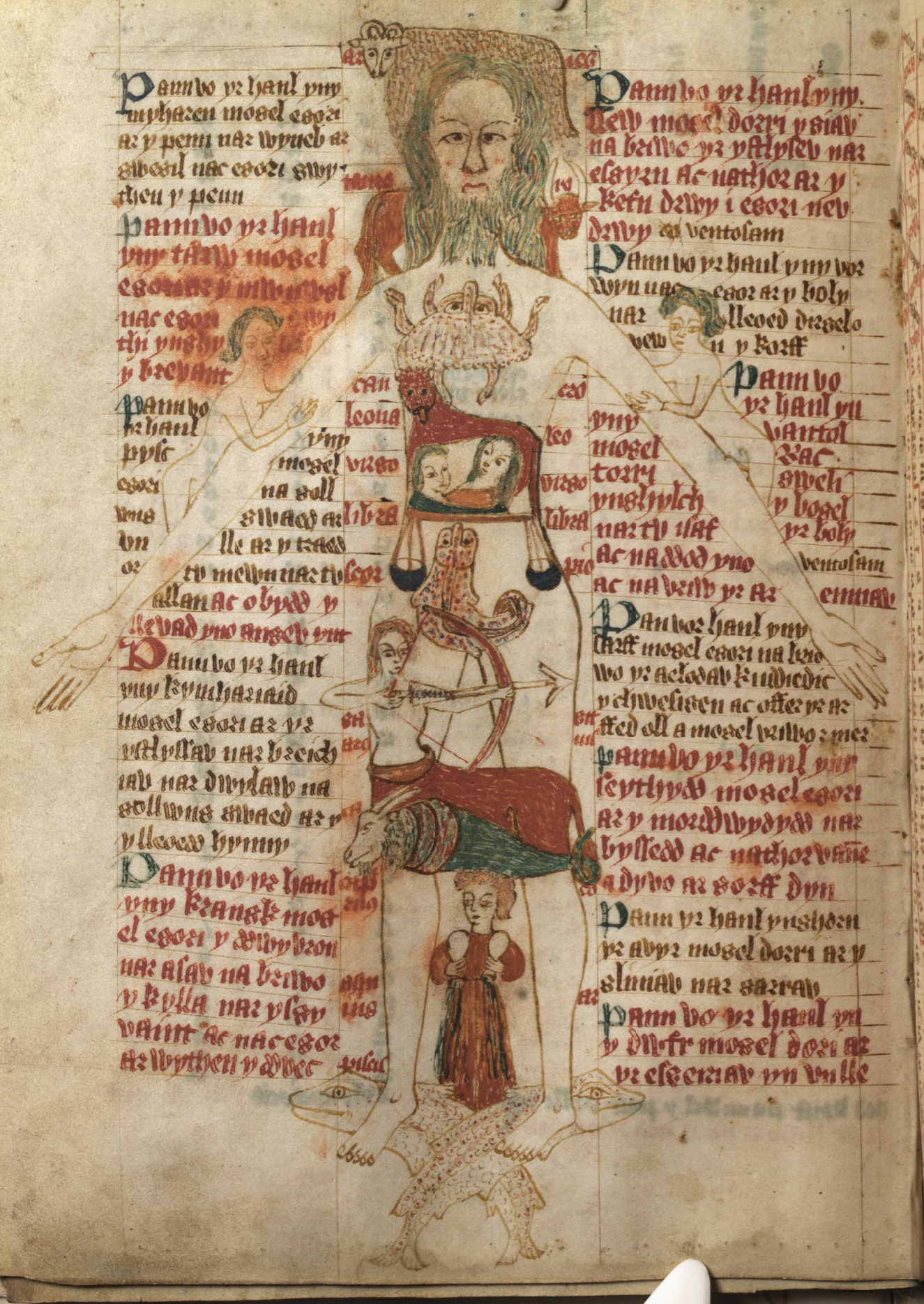
"The Zodiac Man", a 15th-c. diagram of a human body and astrological symbols with instructions in Welsh explaining the importance of astrology from a medical perspective; a centaur is depicted around the thighs as Sagittarius below Scorpio [genitalia] and above Capricorn [knees].

=== Classical literature ===
Jerome's version of the Life of St Anthony the Great, written by Athanasius of Alexandria about the hermit monk of Egypt, was widely disseminated in the Middle Ages; it relates Anthony's encounter with a centaur who challenged the saint, but was forced to admit that the old gods had been overthrown. The episode was often depicted in The Meeting of St Anthony Abbot and St Paul the Hermit by the painter Stefano di Giovanni, who was known as "Sassetta". Of the two episodic depictions of the hermit Anthony's travel to greet the hermit Paul, one is his encounter with the demonic figure of a centaur along the pathway in a wood.

Lucretius, in his first-century BC philosophical poem On the Nature of Things, denied the existence of centaurs, based on the differing rates of growth of human and equine anatomies. Specifically, he states that at the age of three years, horses are in the prime of their life while humans at the same age are still little more than babies, making hybrid animals impossible.

=== Medieval literature ===
Centaurs are among the creatures which 14th-century Italian poet Dante placed as guardians in his Inferno. In Canto XII, Dante and his guide Virgil meet a band led by Chiron and Pholus, guarding the bank of Phlegethon in the seventh circle of Hell, a river of boiling blood in which the violent against their neighbours are immersed, shooting arrows into any who move to a shallower spot than their allotted station. The two poets are treated with courtesy, and Nessus guides them to a ford. In Canto XXIV, in the eighth circle, in Bolgia 7, a ditch where thieves are confined, they meet but do not converse with Cacus (who is a giant in the ancient sources), wreathed in serpents and with a fire-breathing dragon on his shoulders, arriving to punish a sinner who has just cursed God. In his Purgatorio, an unseen spirit on the sixth terrace cites the centaurs ("the drunken double-breasted ones who fought Theseus") as examples of the sin of gluttony.

=== Modern day literature ===
C.S. Lewis's The Chronicles of Narnia series portrays centaurs as wise and courageous creatures, who are gifted in fields such as astronomy and medicine. John Updike's 1963 novel The Centaur contains numerous references to mythological centaurs. The author depicts a rural Pennsylvanian town as seen through the optics of the myth of the centaur. An unknown and marginalized local school teacher, just like the mythological Chiron did for Prometheus, gave up his life for the future of his son who had chosen to be an independent artist in New York.

In J.K. Rowling's Harry Potter series, centaurs inhabit the Forbidden Forest near Hogwarts, and are talented archers and healers; they are also known to their proficiency in astrology. The centaurs in Rick Riordan's Percy Jackson & the Olympians are portrayed as wild party-goers, with the exception of Chiron, who serves as the main director of activities at the series' demigod training facility.

== Gallery ==
Battle of Centaurs and Wild Beasts (120-130 CE), originally for the dining-room of Hadrian's Villa, now Staatliche Museen zu Berlin.

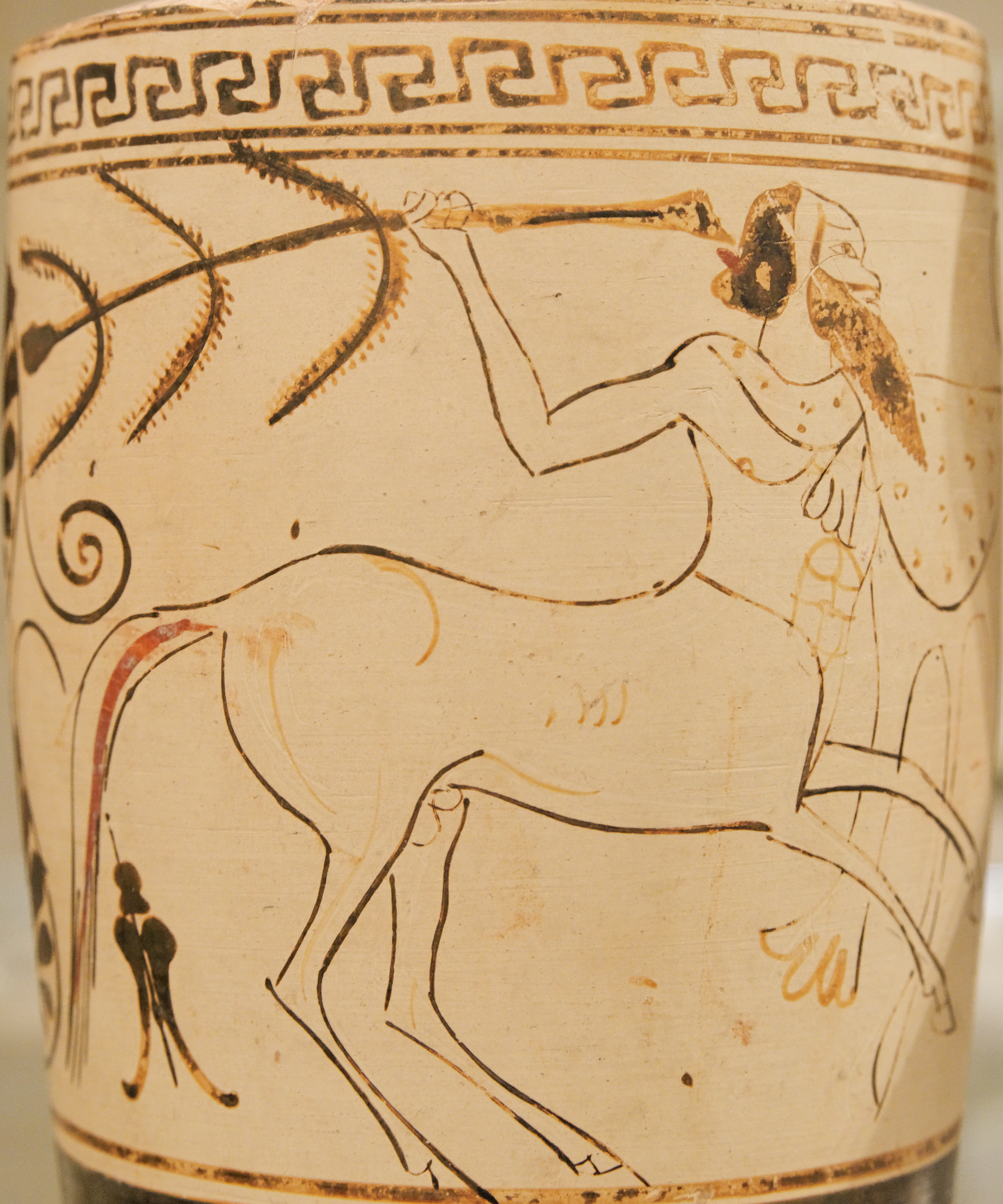
Diosphos Painter, white-ground lekythos (500 BC)

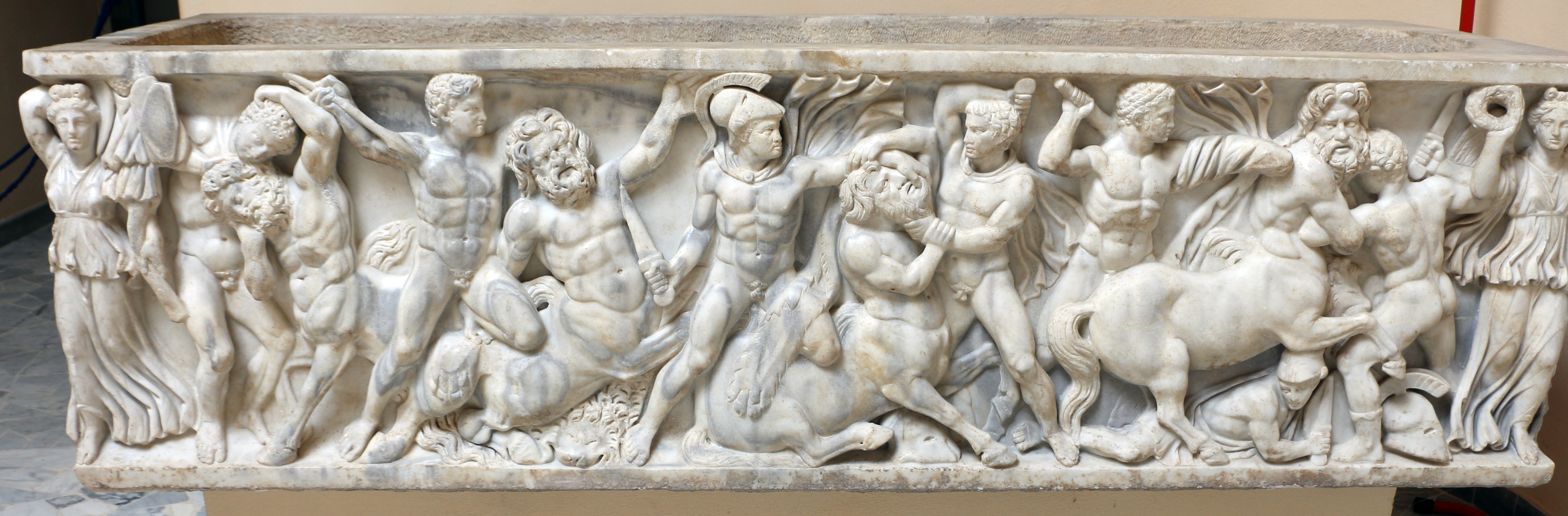
Bas relief from an ancient Roman sarcophagus depicting a Centauromachy

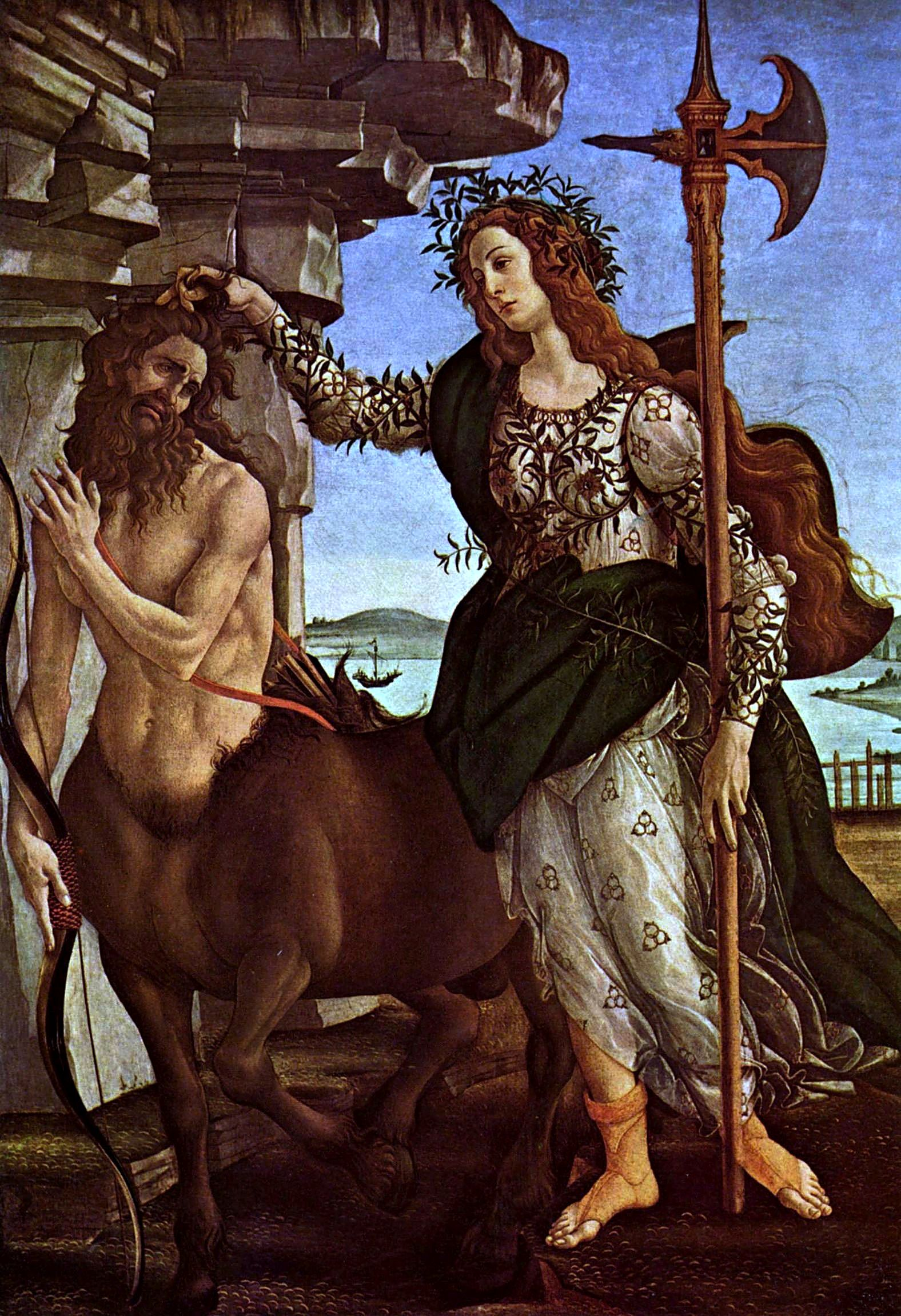
Botticelli, Pallas and Centaur (1482–83)

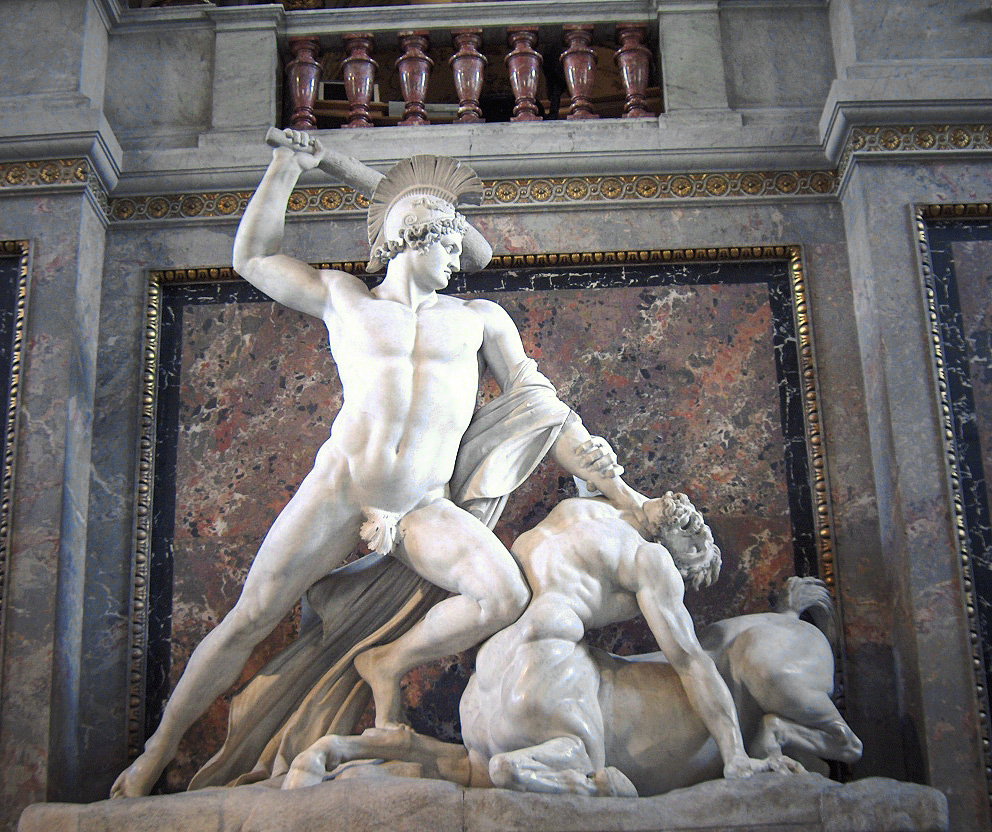
Antonio Canova, Theseus Defeats the Centaur (1805–1819)

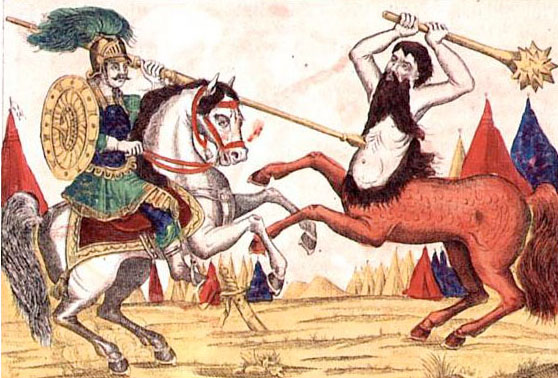
Prince Bova fights Polkan, Russian lubok (1860)

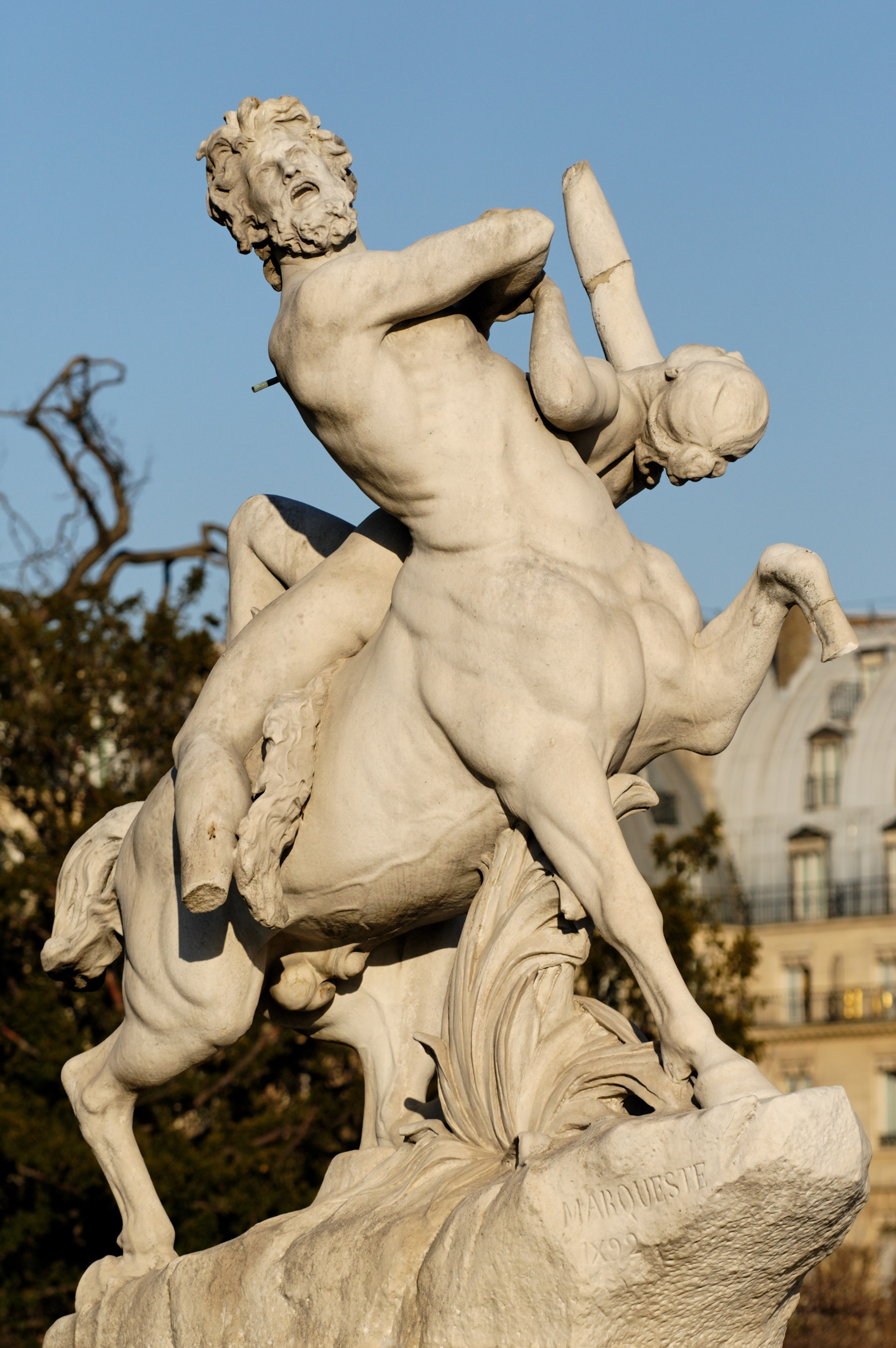
Centaur carrying off a nymph (1892) by Laurent Marqueste (Tuileries Garden, Paris)

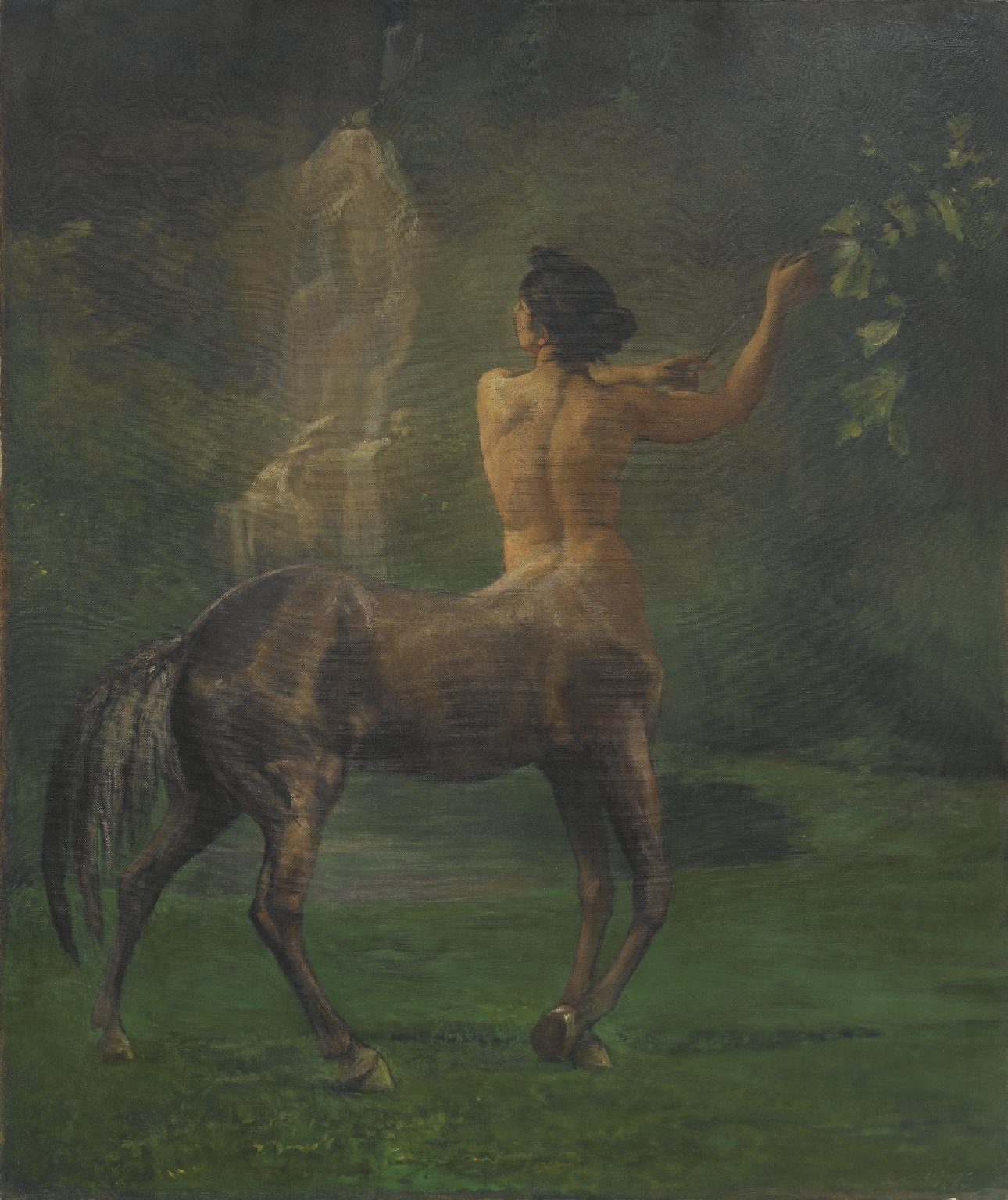
Centauress, by John La Farge

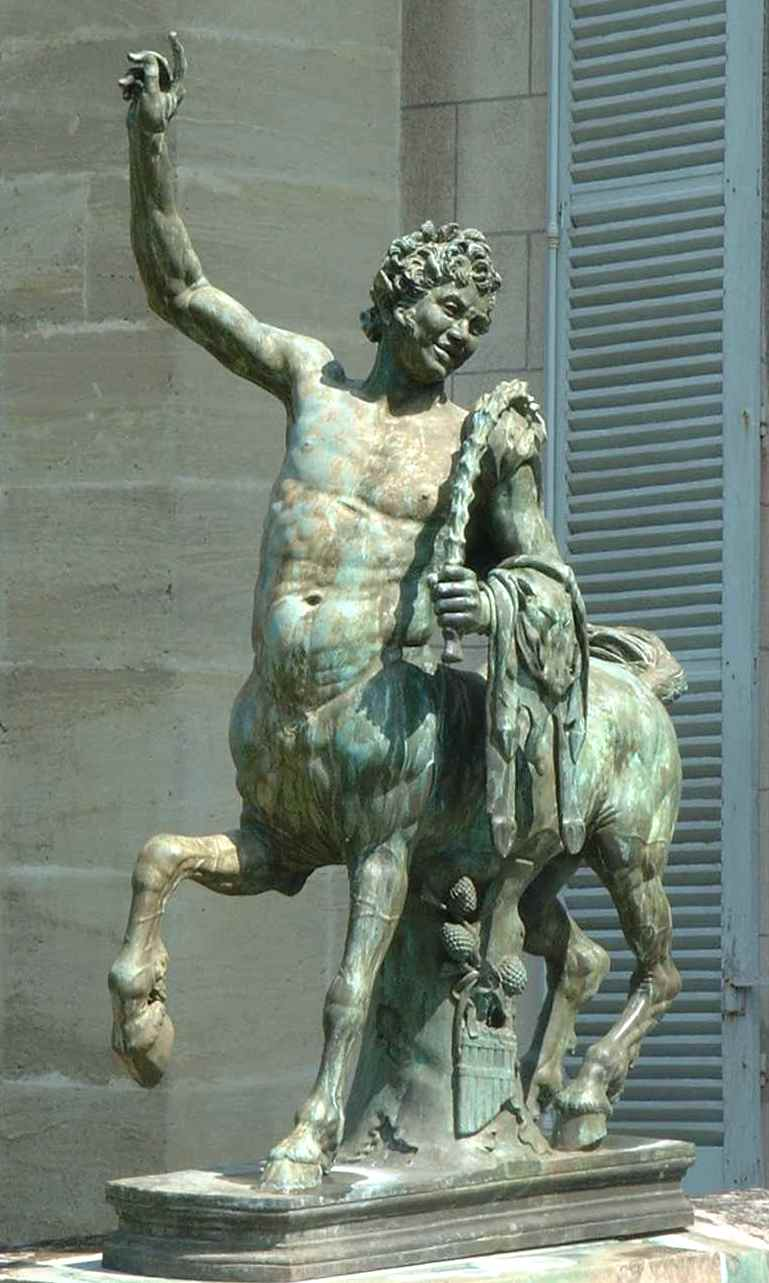
A bronze statue of a centaur, after the Furietti Centaurs

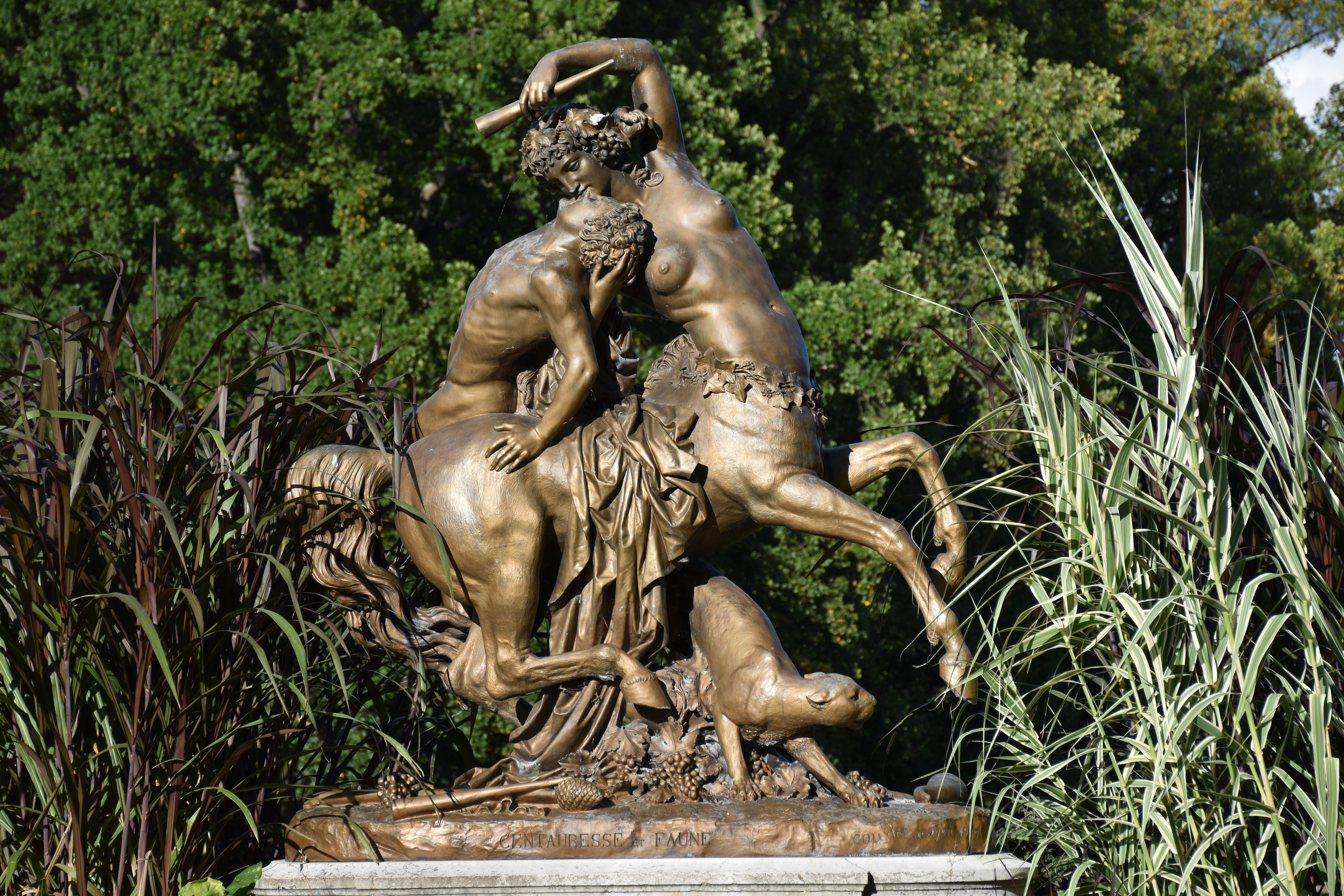
Augustin Courtet, Centauress and Faun (1849), Lyon, Parc de la Tête d'or

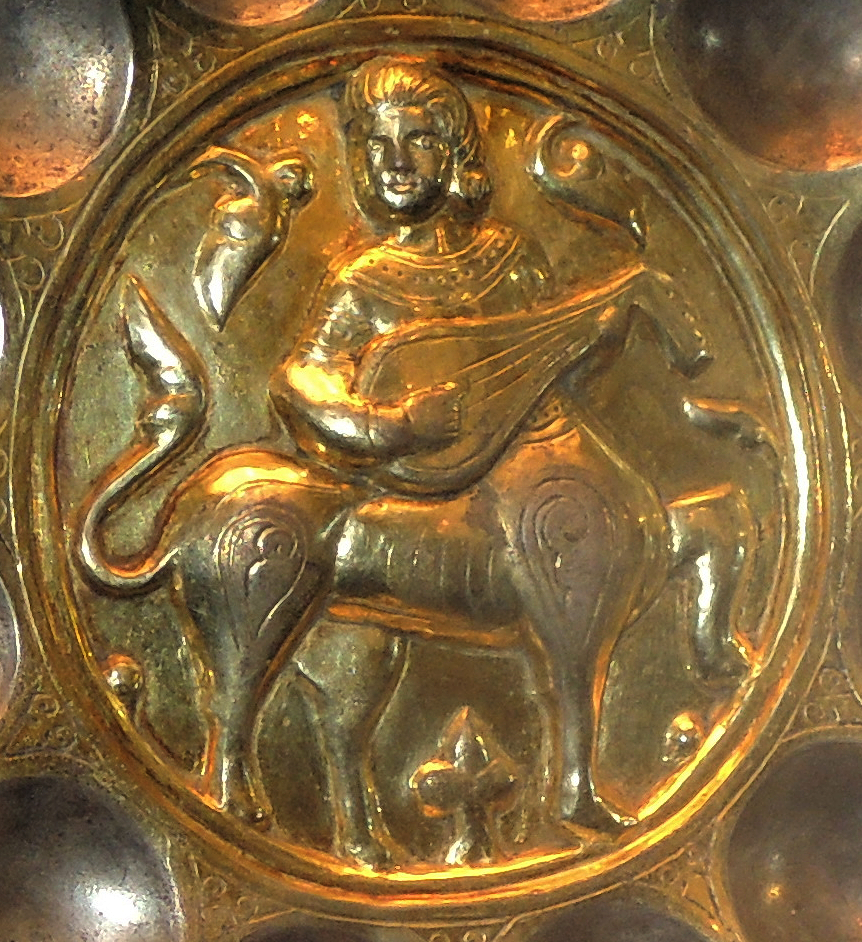
Byzantine Empire, 12th-13th century. Silver artwork from cup, depicting the centaur as a lute-playing musician. Collection of the Kremlin.

== See also ==
- List of centaurs

Other hybrid creatures appear in Greek mythology, always with some liminal connection that links Hellenic culture with archaic or non-Hellenic cultures:

- Centauride — A word for a female centaur.
- Furietti Centaurs – Pair of Hellenistic or Roman statues
- Hippocamp — A half-horse, half-fish creature, sacred to Poseidon.
- Hybrid (mythology) – Mythological creature combining body parts of more than one real species
- Ichthyocentaur – A type of aquatic centaur with a fish tail instead of hindquarters.
- Ipotane – Another half-human half-horse creature.
- Legendary creature – Supernatural animal
- Lists of legendary creatures
- Minotaur – Creature of Greek mythology, A bull-headed humanoid who haunted a labyrinth on Crete.
- Onocentaur – A type of centaur that is part-donkey.
- Sagittarius – Ninth astrological sign of the zodiac
- Sagittarius (constellation) – Zodiac constellation in the southern celestial hemisphere
- Satyr – Male nature spirit with horse or goat features found in Greek mythology

Also,

- Hindu Kamadhenu
- Indian Kinnara which are half-horse and half-man creatures.
- Islamic Buraq, a heavenly steed often portrayed as an equine being with a human face.
- Philippine Tikbalang
- Roman Faun (Satyr-like nature spirits), and the Hippopodes of Pomponius Mela, Pliny the Elder, and later authors.
- Scottish Each uisge and Nuckelavee
- Welsh Ceffyl Dŵr

Additionally, Bucentaur, the name of several historically important Venetian vessels, was linked to a posited ox-centaur or βουκένταυρος (boukentauros) by fanciful and likely spurious folk-etymology.
