= George E. Duckworth =

American classicist

- Born: February 13, 1903; Little York, New Jersey, U.S.
- Died: April 5, 1972 (aged 69); Princeton, New Jersey, U.S.
- Occupation: Classicist
- Title: Giger Professor of Latin
- Spouse: Dorothy Ellwood Atkin
- Awards: Guggenheim Fellowship (1957–58)

Academic background
- Education: Princeton University (AB, AM, PhD)

Academic work
- Discipline: Classics
- Sub-discipline: Latin literature; Roman comedy; Virgil
- Institutions: Princeton University
- Notable works: The Nature of Roman Comedy (1952); Structural Patterns and Proportions in Vergil's Aeneid (1962)

George Eckel Duckworth (February 13, 1903 – April 5, 1972) was an American classicist at Princeton University, serving as the Giger Professor of Latin from 1946 until his retirement in 1971. A scholar of Roman comedy and of Virgil, he is best known for his critical edition of Plautus's Epidicus (1940) and for The Nature of Roman Comedy (1952), long regarded as the standard introduction to the subject, as well as for his controversial argument that Virgil and other Latin poets structured their verse according to the golden ratio. He served as president of the American Philological Association in 1955–56.

== Early life and education ==
George Eckel Duckworth was born on February 13, 1903, in Little York, New Jersey, to Edwin James Duckworth and Eva Eckel Duckworth. He entered Princeton University with the class of 1924, combining majors in English and Classics, and graduated Phi Beta Kappa and summa cum laude with an A.B. He remained at Princeton as an instructor in classics for the following year while beginning graduate study, receiving his A.M. in 1926. He then taught for two years at the University of Nebraska before returning to Princeton around 1928; he was appointed an instructor there in 1929. That same year, on July 8, 1929, he married Dorothy Ellwood Atkin of Rochester, New York; the couple had two children, a daughter and a son. He completed his Ph.D. in 1931 with a dissertation titled Foreshadowing and Suspense in the Epics of Homer, Apollonius, and Vergil, published by Princeton University Press in 1933, which he later credited with sparking a lifelong preoccupation with epic poetry and with Virgil in particular.

== Academic career ==
Duckworth was promoted to assistant professor at Princeton in 1930 and to associate professor in 1940. He served as acting chair of the Department of Classics from 1943 to 1946, when he was appointed to the endowed Giger Professorship of Latin, a position he held until his retirement in 1971. Counting from his undergraduate years, he had by then been associated with Princeton for forty-nine years. According to his student Karl Galinsky, the core of the Princeton classics faculty in the 1960s consisted of four senior professors of the same generation—Duckworth, Francis R. B. Godolphin, John V. A. Fine, and "Mike" Oates—who had not only earned their doctorates at Princeton but had been undergraduates there together.

Duckworth began his teaching career chiefly as an instructor of Greek, later shifting his emphasis to Latin—a change he liked to say was prompted in part by once being introduced to a lecture audience as "a man who knows his Greek from alpha to zeta." In the 1950s he relinquished his teaching of Homer and the Greek lyric poets to younger colleagues in the department in order to concentrate his energy on Latin literature, particularly Virgil and Horace.

== Scholarship on Roman comedy ==
Duckworth's work on Roman comedy began as an act of homage. In 1932, the chair of the Classics Department, Arthur L. Wheeler, died suddenly while planning a badly needed new edition of Plautus's Epidicus, having already obtained photographic reproductions of its four most important manuscripts. At the suggestion of Wheeler's widow and the department's new chairman, Duane Reed Stuart, Duckworth undertook to complete the project, a task that required a thorough study of its manuscript tradition, a review of all earlier editions, and a detailed command of the scholarship on Roman comedy. The result, T. Macci Plauti Epidicus, Edited with Critical Apparatus and Commentary, which incorporated Wheeler's unfinished work, was published by Princeton University Press in 1940 to an enthusiastic scholarly reception. It was later described by his colleagues as one of the first full critical editions, in the tradition of German wissenschaftliche Ausgaben, of an ancient literary text produced by an American scholar.

The competence Duckworth gained in preparing the Epidicus allowed him to teach Roman comedy for years afterward at both the graduate and undergraduate level and to produce numerous articles and reviews on Plautus and Terence, including studies such as "The Structure of the Miles Gloriosus" (1935) and "The Unnamed Characters in the Plays of Plautus" (1938). This body of work culminated in The Nature of Roman Comedy: A Study in Popular Entertainment (Princeton University Press, 1952). Since the late nineteenth century, classical scholars had tended to treat the surviving Roman comedies chiefly as evidence for reconstructing their lost Greek originals, an approach that had left the plays' own humor and appeal poorly understood. Duckworth's synthesis instead treated Plautus and Terence on their own terms, combining a wealth of information with a fair presentation of competing scholarly viewpoints rather than dogmatic argument. The book became, and for decades remained, the standard introduction to Roman comedy. Duckworth also produced The Complete Roman Drama (2 vols., Random House, 1942), an anthology of English translations of the comedies of Plautus and Terence and the tragedies of Seneca, as well as a shorter classroom anthology, Roman Comedies (1963).

== Scholarship on Virgil ==
Duckworth's Virgilian scholarship intensified in the last two decades of his career. A series of articles beginning with "The Architecture of the Aeneid" (1954) examined the craftsmanship underlying Virgil's construction of the epic. His long essay "Animae Dimidium Meae: Two Poets of Rome" (1956), part of which had been delivered the previous year as his presidential address to the American Philological Association, demonstrated a command of Horace to match his knowledge of Virgil and was judged by colleagues to be among his finest pieces of literary criticism. In 1961, he published "Turnus and Duryodhana" in the Transactions of the American Philological Association, an experimental comparative study seeking parallels between the Aeneid and the Sanskrit epic Mahabharata.

=== The golden ratio theory ===
In December 1960, Duckworth presented a paper titled "Mathematical Symmetry in Vergil's Aeneid" at the annual philological meetings in Washington, D.C. The paper argued that Virgil and other Latin poets had deliberately structured their verse according to the golden ratio, and it drew enough attention that The Washington Post ran a feature article on it. Duckworth developed the argument fully in Structural Patterns and Proportions in Vergil's Aeneid (University of Michigan Press, 1962), which traced the ratio through the structure of the entire poem. The theory proved controversial among fellow Latinists, and Duckworth's own students recalled that Princeton classics graduate students in the late 1960s wore T-shirts reading "Altertumswissenschaft = .618" in wry reference to it. His colleagues in the American Philological Association nonetheless judged that the "immense amount of energy and time" behind the demonstration had not been wasted, whatever the ultimate verdict on the theory itself.

To extend the argument, Duckworth undertook the laborious task of manually scanning the whole corpus of extant Latin hexameter poetry for patterns in the use of dactyls and spondees—work that, as his students later observed, a computer could complete far more quickly within a decade. The results appeared in his final book, Vergil and Classical Hexameter Poetry: A Study in Metrical Variety (University of Michigan Press, 1969), described by colleagues as the most comprehensive analysis of the Latin hexameter from Ennius to Corippus then available. One of his last pieces of writing, published posthumously, examined hexameter patterns in the Latin verse of John Milton.

== Teaching and mentorship ==
Colleagues and former students remembered Duckworth as an unusually dedicated and effective teacher, particularly in his final two decades of focus on Virgil and Horace. When he was stricken with his final illness, the students of his last Virgil seminar came as a group to visit him. Many seminar papers written under his direction grew into published journal articles, and several dissertations he supervised were later published as books.

In a 1996 memoir written for volume of faculty reminiscences, classicist Karl Galinsky, who wrote his dissertation under Duckworth's direction in the mid-1960s, described him as a generous, non-dogmatic mentor who gave students room to define their own topics rather than pressing them to adopt his own theories. Galinsky summarized Duckworth's character using the Latin terms auctoritas, humanitas, and magnitudo animi.

== Professional service and honors ==
Duckworth was a trustee of the American Academy in Rome from 1947 to 1959 and served as professor-in-charge of the summer session of the academy's School of Classical Studies from 1952 to 1956. He was a visiting professor of classics at Harvard University in 1955–56 and, in the same period, served as president of the American Philological Association. He held a Guggenheim Fellowship in 1957–58 and was a visiting scholar at the University Center in Virginia, Richmond, in 1958. Outside classics, he served as a trustee of Rider College from 1937 to 1956 and for many years was a member of the Princeton Township Board of Education.

== Personal life and death ==
Duckworth and his wife, Dorothy, hosted an annual spring garden party at their home that colleagues remembered as an epitome of Princeton hospitality. He was diagnosed with cancer and continued to teach and publish through most of a five-year illness before his death on April 5, 1972, at Merwick, the long-term care facility of Princeton Hospital, at the age of 69. A memorial minute in his honor, composed by Henry T. Rowell, was read and adopted by a rising vote at the American Philological Association's annual meeting in December 1972.

== Selected publications ==
- Foreshadowing and Suspense in the Epics of Homer, Apollonius, and Vergil. Princeton: Princeton University Press, 1933.
- T. Macci Plauti Epidicus, Edited with Critical Apparatus and Commentary. Princeton: Princeton University Press, 1940.
- The Complete Roman Drama (2 vols.). New York: Random House, 1942.
- The Nature of Roman Comedy: A Study in Popular Entertainment. Princeton: Princeton University Press, 1952.
- "The Architecture of the Aeneid." American Journal of Philology 75 (1954): 1–15.
- "Animae Dimidium Meae: Two Poets of Rome." Transactions and Proceedings of the American Philological Association 87 (1956): 281–316.
- "Turnus and Duryodhana." Transactions and Proceedings of the American Philological Association 92 (1961): 81–127.
- Structural Patterns and Proportions in Vergil's Aeneid. Ann Arbor: University of Michigan Press, 1962.
- Roman Comedies: An Anthology. New York, 1963.
- Vergil and Classical Hexameter Poetry: A Study in Metrical Variety. Ann Arbor: University of Michigan Press, 1969.
