= Andrew L. Ford =

American classical scholar

- Born: Andrew Laughlin Ford; June 9, 1952 (age 74)
- Employer: Princeton University
- Title: Ewing Professor of Greek Language and Literature

Academic background
- Education: Cornell University (B.A., 1974); Yale University (Ph.D., 1981)

Academic work
- Discipline: Classics
- Sub-discipline: Greek literature, literary criticism, intellectual history

Andrew Laughlin Ford (born 9 June 1952) is an American classical scholar specializing in ancient Greek literature, literary criticism, and intellectual history. He served as Ewing Professor of Greek Language and Literature at Princeton University and is known particularly for his work on Homer, the history of literary criticism in ancient Greece, and the social dimensions of Greek poetic culture.

== Early life and education ==
Ford completed his undergraduate studies at Cornell University in 1974, graduating with distinction. He received his Ph.D. from Yale University in 1981 with a dissertation entitled Early Greek Words for Poetry: aoidê, epos, poiêsis, advised by Heinrich von Staden.

Raised in a Catholic family with seven siblings, Ford later recalled the importance of conversation, performance, and storytelling in his upbringing.

== Academic career ==
Ford began teaching as an instructor at Smith College in 1980. From 1984 to 1986 he was Mellon Postdoctoral Fellow at Cornell University. In 1986 he joined the faculty of Princeton University, where he taught for more than three decades. He later became Ewing Professor of Greek Language and Literature, succeeding Froma Zeitlin. After thirty-five years on the Princeton faculty, Ford transferred to emeritus status in 2021.

Ford’s research has focused on Greek poetry and prose from Homer through the classical period, with particular emphasis on literary criticism, reception, and the social history of literature. His first major monograph, Homer: The Poetry of the Past (1992), examined the ways in which Homeric poetry constructs authority through representations of tradition and memory. The book was named an “Outstanding Academic Book” for 1993 by Choice.

Ford later published The Origins of Criticism: Literary Culture and Poetic Theory in Classical Greece (2002), a major study of the emergence of literary criticism and aesthetic reflection in archaic and classical Greece. The work explored how criticism arose within broader civic, educational, and performative contexts rather than as an isolated philosophical discipline. He has also written extensively on Homeric poetry, Greek drama, rhetoric, sophistic thought, and ancient conceptions of performance and interpretation. His article “Protagoras’ Head,” published in American Journal of Philology in 1994, received the Gildersleeve Prize.

== Personal life ==
While teaching at Smith College, Ford met his wife Martine Gantrel, who taught at Smith as professor of French studies for forty-four years.

== Selected works ==
- Homer: The Poetry of the Past (1992)
- The Origins of Criticism: Literary Culture and Poetic Theory in Classical Greece (2002)
- Aristotle as Poet: The Song for Hermias and Its Contexts (2010)
