= Michael A. Flower =

Classicist and historian of ancient Greece

- Born: Michael Attyah Flower; June 26, 1956 (age 70); Lynwood, California
- Occupations: Classicist; historian of ancient Greece
- Title: David Magie '97 Class of 1897 Professor of Classics, Emeritus
- Spouse: Harriet I. Flower

Academic background
- Education: University of California, Berkeley (BA); University College, Oxford (BA, MA); Brown University (PhD)

Academic work
- Discipline: Classics
- Sub-discipline: Greek history and historiography; Greek religion; Achaemenid Persia
- Institutions: Princeton University; Franklin & Marshall College
- Notable works: Theopompus of Chios (1994); The Seer in Ancient Greece (2008); Xenophon's Anabasis, or The Expedition of Cyrus (2012)

Michael Attyah Flower (born June 26, 1956) is an American classicist and historian of ancient Greece. He was the David Magie '97 Class of 1897 Professor of Classics at Princeton University, where he taught from 2003 until his retirement in 2026. A specialist in Greek historiography and ancient Greek religion, with particular interests in Sparta and Achaemenid Persia, Flower is regarded as a leading contemporary scholar of the historian and soldier Xenophon, and has also published influential studies of Greek divination and of the fragmentary fourth-century BC historian Theopompus.

== Early life and education ==
Michael Attyah Flower was born in Lynwood, California on June 26, 1956. As a teenager, Flower won the Parkes Weber Prize of the Royal Numismatic Society in London for 1975, for an essay on the gold coinage of Tarentum under Alexander I of Epirus and Alexander of Macedonia. He attended the summer session of the American School of Classical Studies at Athens in 1977 and received a Bachelor of Arts in classical languages from the University of California, Berkeley in 1978. He then earned a second BA, followed by an MA, in classics at University College, Oxford, in 1981, choosing the ancient history and philosophy options of Greats. He received a Ph.D. in classics from Brown University in 1986, supported by a University Fellowship (1981–82) and a Michaelides Fellowship (1985); his dissertation formed the basis of his first book, on the Greek historian Theopompus of Chios.

== Academic career ==
Upon receiving his doctorate, Flower joined the classics faculty of Franklin & Marshall College in Lancaster, Pennsylvania, in 1986, rising from assistant to associate professor and serving two terms as department chair, in 2000–01 and 2002–03. He was a visiting associate professor of Greek at Bryn Mawr College in the spring of 1998 and a visiting professor of classics at Princeton University in the spring of 2002, before moving to Princeton permanently in 2003 as a lecturer in classics, the same year his wife, Roman historian Harriet Flower, joined Princeton's faculty.

At Princeton, Flower was appointed senior research scholar with a continuing appointment in 2007, promoted to lecturer with the rank of professor in 2013, and was converted to a full professorship in 2015. He was named the David Magie '97 Class of 1897 Professor of Classics in 2018. He served as director of graduate studies for the classics department from 2015 to 2018 and as department chair from July 2019 to July 2022, and took a lead role in undergraduate residential life while Harriet Flower served as head of Mathey College. During his time as director of graduate studies, he helped develop Princeton's Predoctoral Fellowship, later renamed the Horizon Fellowship, a model for broadening the pool of prospective doctoral students that has since been adopted by other Princeton departments and by other institutions.

Flower held earlier visiting and fellowship appointments as a Junior Fellow at the Center for Hellenic Studies in Washington, D.C. (1990–91) and as a visiting scholar at Wolfson College, Oxford (1993–94), and was later a Loeb Classical Library Foundation Fellow in the fall terms of 2010 and 2022 and an Old Dominion Research Professor at Princeton's Humanities Council in 2018–19.

Flower transferred to emeritus status on July 1, 2026, alongside his wife, marking a combined 46 years of service by the couple to the classics department and the university. That April, the department and the university's Humanities Council sponsored a three-day retirement conference in the couple's honor, titled Floralia, at which former doctoral advisees of the Flowers presented papers, bridged by a keynote address from Flower's longtime collaborator John Marincola.

== Research ==
=== Theopompus, Xenophon, and Greek historiography ===
Flower's first book, Theopompus of Chios: History and Rhetoric in the Fourth Century BC (Oxford University Press, 1994), grew out of his doctoral dissertation and reassessed the fragmentary remains of Theopompus by examining the contexts in which later authors cited them. Reviewers described it as a "must-read" contribution to the study of fourth-century Greek historical writing, praising its clarity and nuance, and it is credited with anticipating a later resurgence of scholarly interest in the fragmentary Greek historians.

Flower has been particularly influential in the modern rehabilitation of Xenophon as a subject of serious historical and literary study. Xenophon's Anabasis, or The Expedition of Cyrus (Oxford University Press, 2012), written for the Oxford Approaches to Classical Literature series, offers a literary and narratological analysis of the work; a review by Vivienne Gray praised the "strong streak of originality" in Flower's analysis alongside his command of existing scholarship, while a notice in the Bryn Mawr Classical Review called the book a "triumph" that illuminated the text on nearly every page. He went on to edit The Cambridge Companion to Xenophon (Cambridge University Press, 2017), which his colleagues would later describe as the most significant product of his Xenophon research and a major contribution to the author's renewed standing in contemporary scholarship.

With his frequent collaborator John Marincola, Flower alsoco-authored an edition with introduction and commentary on Book IX of Herodotus's Histories for Cambridge University Press's Cambridge Greek and Latin Classics series (2002; reprinted with corrections, 2008), designed for classroom use while also modeling how literary, historical, and archaeological evidence can be brought to bear jointly on a single text; it has become one of the series' most widely used volumes.

=== Greek religion and divination ===
The Seer in Ancient Greece (University of California Press, 2008) examines the role, status, and public image of the Greek seer (mantis) and the function of divination in Greek society, combining historiographical analysis with methods drawn from the anthropology of religion and situating Greek practice within the wider context of Near Eastern divination. Flower has continued to work comparatively on Greek religion, drawing on Near Eastern, Tibetan, and Native American traditions, including in the influential article "Understanding Delphi Through Tibet" (Greece & Rome, 2018). His next monograph, Taking Ancient Greek Religion Seriously: An Ontological and Comparative Investigation, is under contract with Cambridge University Press, and he is separately preparing a new commentary on Andocides' On the Mysteries for the Cambridge Greek and Latin Classics series.

== Teaching and mentorship ==
Flower was interviewed, together with fellow Princeton classicist Dan-el Padilla Peralta, about the department's efforts to diversify the discipline of classics. His development of Princeton's Predoctoral (later Horizon) Fellowship program, aimed at broadening the pool of prospective doctoral students, has been adopted as a model by other departments at Princeton and elsewhere.

== Honors and awards ==
- Parkes Weber Prize, Royal Numismatic Society, London (1975)
- Junior Fellow, Center for Hellenic Studies, Washington, D.C. (1990–91)
- National Endowment for the Humanities Fellowship for College Teachers and Independent Scholars (1999–2000)
- Loeb Classical Library Foundation Fellowship (Fall 2010 and Fall 2022)
- Old Dominion Research Professor, Humanities Council, Princeton University (2018–19)

== Personal life ==
Flower is married to classicist Harriet Isabel Flower, a historian of ancient Rome who was the Andrew Fleming West Professor of Classics at Princeton. Harriet Flower joined him on the Franklin & Marshall College faculty in 1994, where the couple shared a single teaching position, and the two moved to Princeton together in 2003. Following their joint transfer to emeritus status in 2026, the couple relocated to Santa Fe, New Mexico.

== Selected publications ==
- Theopompus of Chios: History and Rhetoric in the Fourth Century BC. Oxford: Oxford University Press, 1994; paperback with postscript, 1997.
- Georgica: Greek Studies in Honour of George Cawkwell (co-editor with Mark Toher). London: Institute of Classical Studies, University of London, Bulletin Supplement 58, 1991.
- Herodotus, Histories, Book IX (edited with introduction and commentary, with John Marincola). Cambridge: Cambridge University Press, 2002.
- The Seer in Ancient Greece. Berkeley: University of California Press, 2008.
- Xenophon's Anabasis, or The Expedition of Cyrus. Oxford: Oxford University Press, 2012.
- The Cambridge Companion to Xenophon (editor). Cambridge: Cambridge University Press, 2017.
