= John V. A. Fine =

John V. A. Fine may refer to:

- John V. A. Fine (1903–1987), American classical scholar
- John V. A. Fine Jr. (born 1939), American historian
