= David J. Furley =

British scholar of Greco-Roman philosophy (1922–2010)

David John Furley FBA
- Born: 24 February 1922; Nottingham, England
- Died: 26 January 2010 (aged 87); Banbury Hospital, Banbury, England
- Education: Jesus College, Cambridge (BA, 1947)
- Employer(s): University College London; Princeton University
- Spouse(s): Diana Armstrong (m. 1948; div. 1966); Phyllis Ross (m. 1967; d. 2009)
- Awards: Howard T. Behrman Award for Distinguished Achievement in the Humanities (1984); Fellow of the British Academy (1990)

David John Furley FBA (24 February 1922 – 26 January 2010) was a British scholar of ancient philosophy and a specialist in Greco-Roman cosmology and natural philosophy. He spent the first two decades of his academic career at University College London and the remainder at Princeton University, where he became Ewing Professor of Greek Language and Literature. Furley is best known for Two Studies in the Greek Atomists (1967) and The Greek Cosmologists (1987), and for a body of shorter writings widely admired for their analytical precision and economy. He was elected a Corresponding Fellow of the British Academy in 1990.

== Early life and education ==
David John Furley was born on 24 February 1922 in Nottingham, the son of Athelstan Willis Furley, a hosiery manufacturer. He attended Nottingham High School, where he proved an exceptionally gifted pupil, served as Captain of the School, attained the rank of Company Sergeant Major in the Officers' Training Corps, and was a regular player for the First XI cricket team. In May 1940, shortly before leaving, he was among a group of senior boys who climbed the school's tower and carved their names on a stone window sill.

Furley left Nottingham having won an Open Scholarship and City of Nottingham Scholarship to read Classics at Jesus College, Cambridge. His studies at Cambridge were interrupted by the Second World War, during which he served in the Royal Artillery, seeing active service in Bombay and subsequently in Burma, where he rose to the rank of Captain. After the war he returned to Cambridge to complete his degree, graduating with first-class honours in 1947. He later became an Honorary Fellow of Jesus College.

== Career ==
=== University College London (1947–1966) ===
In 1947 Furley took up an assistant lectureship in the Departments of Greek and Latin at University College London, following promotions up to the level of reader before departing for Princeton. During this period he produced his first major publication, a Loeb Classical Library edition and translation of the pseudo-Aristotelian On the Cosmos (Harvard University Press, 1955). He was a co-founder of the Southern Association for Ancient Philosophy, and in September 2005 was one of few survivors from its inaugural meeting to gather in Oxford for its fiftieth anniversary. It was at UCL that Furley began the work on Epicureanism and atomism that would culminate in his landmark 1967 monograph. A colleague, A. A. Long, ran an influential seminar on Stoicism at the Institute of Classical Studies in 1967–68 that formed the basis for Long's Problems in Stoicism (1971); Long later collaborated with his former UCL doctoral student David Sedley on The Hellenistic Philosophers (1987).

=== Princeton University (1966–1992) ===
In 1966, Furley was appointed professor at Princeton University, where from 1974 he held the Ewing Professorship of Greek Language and Literature, succeeding John V. A. Fine. He directed the Program in Classical Philosophy from 1969 to 1982 and chaired the Department of Classics from 1982 to 1985. He was also editor of the journal Phronesis from 1968 to 1972. In collaboration first with Gregory Vlastos and Terry Penner, and later with Michael Frede, John M. Cooper, and Alexander Nehamas, he helped build Princeton's reputation as a world-leading centre for the study of ancient philosophy.

In 1984, Furley became the first classicist to receive Princeton's Howard T. Behrman Award for Distinguished Achievement in the Humanities. At the award ceremony, President William G. Bowen remarked that Furley had "established an international reputation as a distinguished scholar and earned the wide respect of his students and fellow faculty members at Princeton as an exceptionally fine teacher and colleague."

During his career Furley served as president of the Society for Ancient Greek Philosophy and as chairman of the International Committee of the Symposium Aristotelicum. He was elected a Corresponding Fellow of the British Academy in 1990.

Furley retired from Princeton in 1992, an occasion marked with a conference in his honour at the Institute of Classical Studies. Not long after, he returned to residence in England, settling at Charlbury in Oxfordshire.

== Scholarship ==
Furley was considered one of the twentieth century's outstanding scholars of Greco-Roman philosophy. While his published output was modest by contemporary standards, many became standard references in the field. The most recurrent motif of his work was a systematic contrast between two radically opposed philosophical and scientific worldviews, atomism and Aristotelianism, with his analyses typically shedding equal light on both traditions.

Furley's most celebrated book, Two Studies in the Greek Atomists (Princeton University Press, 1967), took two central themes of Epicurean atomism and reconstructed the origins of each through close study of the relevant texts in relation to their Aristotelian background. Described as a model of lucid and judicious scholarship, the monograph was credited by David Sedley with bringing Epicureanism into the philosophical mainstream.

Furley planned The Greek Cosmologists as a major two-volume synthesis. Volume I (Cambridge University Press, 1987) appeared to wide recognition, but the eagerly awaited second volume never followed. Most of his articles were collected in Cosmic Problems: Essays on Greek and Roman Philosophy of Nature (Cambridge University Press, 1989). He also co-authored with J. S. Wilkie a fully annotated edition, Galen on Respiration and the Arteries (1984), translated parts of John Philoponus's commentary on Aristotle's Physics for the Ancient Commentators on Aristotle series (1991), and edited the second volume of the Routledge History of Philosophy (1997).

== Personal life ==
Furley married Diana Armstrong in 1948; the marriage ended in divorce in 1966. They had two sons, John and William, the latter himself a classical scholar. In 1967 he married Phyllis Ross, who died in 2009. At Princeton, Furley and Phyllis were active figures in and beyond the Classics community, known especially for the play-readings they held at their home in Ringoes, New Jersey over a period of twenty-seven years.

Furley was known among colleagues and students for his wit, modesty, and dry sense of humor. In 1978, while traveling to Greece for ceremonies marking the 2,300th anniversary of Aristotle's death, he reportedly explained his trip to an Olympic Airways ticket agent, who replied: “Oh, yes—Onassis.”

Furley died on 26 January 2010 at Banbury Hospital, Banbury, following a long illness. His funeral was held on 12 February 2010 in Charlbury, near Oxford. Lucretius was among Furley's intellectual heroes, and Lucretius's repudiation of the fear of death was read at Furley's funeral.

== Selected bibliography ==
- Furley, David J. (1955). Aristotle: On the Cosmos. Loeb Classical Library. Harvard University Press.
- Furley, David J. (1967). Two Studies in the Greek Atomists. Princeton University Press.
- Furley, David J.; Wilkie, J. S. (1984). Galen on Respiration and the Arteries. Princeton University Press.
- Furley, David J. (1987). The Greek Cosmologists, Volume I. Cambridge University Press.
- Furley, David J. (1989). Cosmic Problems: Essays on Greek and Roman Philosophy of Nature. Cambridge University Press.
- Furley, David J.; Nehamas, Alexander (1994). Aristotle's "Rhetoric": Philosophical Essays. Princeton University Press.
- Furley, David J. (1997). Routledge History of Philosophy, Volume II: From Aristotle to Augustine. Routledge.
