= Ewing Professor of Greek =

Endowed professorship at Princeton University

The Ewing Professorship of Greek Language and Literature is an endowed chair in the Department of Classics at Princeton University. Established in 1877, it is one of the university’s oldest endowed professorships in the humanities. Its current holder is Barbara Graziosi.

== History ==
The professorship was established in 1877 as Princeton’s sole chair in ancient Greek studies. Following the death of Princeton benefactor John Cleve Green, his residual legatees, including Green's nephew Charles Ewing Green, endowed the professorship as their first gift of the estate. The professorship was named in honor of the latter Green's namesake and grandfather, Charles Ewing, who had served as trustee of the university (then known as the College of New Jersey) from 1820 to 1832 and as Chief Justice of the Supreme Court of New Jersey from 1824 to 1832. Its inaugural occupant was S. Stanhope Orris, who held the chair until his retirement in 1902.

Holders of the professorship have included prominent scholars of Greek language, literature, history, and philosophy.

== List of Ewing Professors of Greek Language and Literature ==
Years	Professor
1877–1902	S. Stanhope Orris
1910–1936	Edmund Yard Robbins
1938–1940	William Kelly Prentice
1946–1949	Whitney J. Oates
1949–1972	John V. A. Fine
1975–1992	David J. Furley
1992–2010	Froma I. Zeitlin
2010–2021	Andrew L. Ford
2022–	Barbara Graziosi

== See also ==
- Andrew Fleming West Chair, Princeton University
- Giger Professor of Latin, Princeton University
- Regius Professor of Greek, University of Cambridge
- Regius Professor of Greek, University of Oxford
- MacDowell Professor of Greek, University of Edinburgh
- Sather Professorship of Classical Literature, University of California, Berkeley
