= Scholar Gu =

Short story by Pu Songling

- Short story by Pu Songling
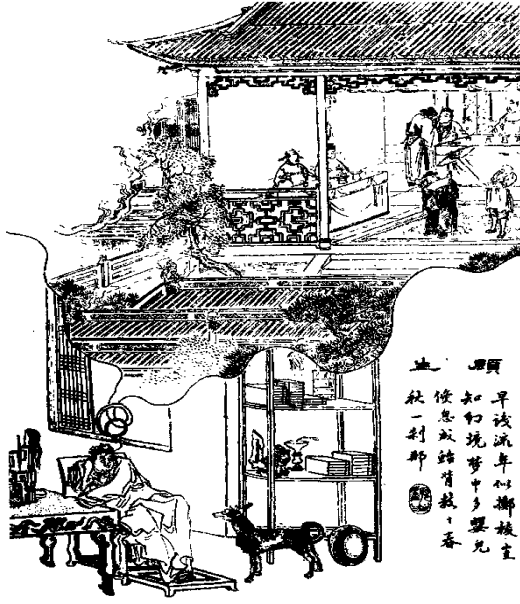
- Illustration from Xiangzhu liaozhai zhiyi tuyong (Liaozhai Zhiyi with commentary and illustrations; 1886)
- Original title: 顧生 (Gu sheng)
- Translator: Herbert Giles (1880)
- Country: China
- Language: Chinese
- Genre(s): Short story

Publication
- Published in: Strange Tales from a Chinese Studio
- Media type: Print (Book)
- Publication date: c. 1740
- Published in English: 1880

Chronology
Shao Shimei (陸押官)	Chen Xijiu (陳錫九)

"Scholar Gu" (traditional Chinese: 顧生; simplified Chinese: 顾生; pinyin: Gù shēng) is a short story by Pu Songling first published in Strange Tales from a Chinese Studio. It follows the titular scholar whose eye infection apparently allows him to another world. The story was first translated into English by Herbert Giles in 1880.

== Plot ==
Jiangnan scholar Gu develops a severe eye infection while staying at an inn. The pain only subsides slightly after ten days, following which he begins to see a sprawling residential estate every time he closes his eyes. One day, while focusing on the same vision, he finds himself seemingly transported to the estate. Gu notices a room filled with crying babies and is invited by a young prince—who had recently recovered from malaria—to watch an opera titled The Blessings of the Borderguard of Hua (華封祝). (Note: According to Judith T. Zeitlin, the title is an allusion to a passage in the Zhuangzi.)

After three acts, however, Gu is awoken by the innkeeper and his servants. Now back in the inn, Gu quickly dismisses them and closes his eyes again. He successfully returns to the estate, but the opera is already into its seventh and final act. There are now at least ten hunchbacked old persons in the audience and they regard Gu with hostility. The prince—now at an advanced age—selects another opera for them to watch, titled Pengzu Takes a Wife (彭祖娶婦).

Halfway into the play, Gu confides to the prince about his eye infection. The prince summons the imperial physician, who applies a greasy substance on the corners of Gu's eyes. Gu takes a nap at the guest chambers and is awoken by what he imagines to be the clanging of opera gongs. Instead, he sees a pack of dogs licking an oil drum in the inn and he realises that his eyes are no longer swollen.

== Publication history ==
Originally titled "Gu sheng" (顧生), the story was first published in Pu Songling's eighteenth-century anthology of nearly five hundred short stories, titled Liaozhai zhiyi or Strange Tales from a Chinese Studio. It was included in the first volume of Strange Stories from a Chinese Studio (1880)—widely regarded as the earliest substantial translation of Liaozhai zhiyi—by British sinologist Herbert Giles, who titled the story "A Singular Case of Opthalmia".

== Themes and analysis ==
The protagonist of the story, Gu, experiences "two phenomena associated with parapsychological research", namely "remote viewing" (or "clairvoyantly visualising a distant site") and "astral projection of his body". Judith T. Zeitlin argues that the story attempts to "dissolve the boundaries separating dream and reality". On one hand, several clues in the story suggest that Gu's trip to the prince's mansion occurred in a dream. The supposed sound of clanging gongs at the end of the second opera, for instance, turns out to be that of dogs licking a container at the inn. On the other hand, Gu's experience does not appear to be entirely imaginary: after he is attended to by the prince's doctor, he awakens to find that his eye inflammation is truly no more.

Contrasting the story to earlier "Chinese dream parables of enlightenment", such as the Tang dynasty Zhenzhong ji or Tale of the Pillow, Zeitlin likens Pu's protagonist to "a spectator at a play ... (witnessing) an allegorized version of Life passing, without really participating in it." She further writes that "what makes this story so arresting is that (Gu's) dream has become independent of the dreamer, and this independence seems above all to prove the reality of the characters in his dream."
