= Harriet Flower =

Classicist and historian of ancient Rome

Harriet I. Flower
- Born: Basel, Switzerland
- Occupations: Classicist; historian of ancient Rome
- Title: Andrew Fleming West Professor of Classics, Emerita
- Spouse: Michael A. Flower
- Awards: Charles J. Goodwin Award of Merit (2018); Howard T. Behrman Award (2018)

Academic background
- Education: University College, Oxford (BA, MA); University of Pennsylvania (PhD)
- Doctoral advisor: Robert E. A. Palmer

Academic work
- Discipline: Classics
- Sub-discipline: Roman history and historiography; epigraphy; Latin literature
- Institutions: Princeton University; Franklin & Marshall College
- Notable works: Ancestor Masks and Aristocratic Power in Roman Culture (1996); Roman Republics (2010); The Dancing Lares and the Serpent in the Garden (2017)

Harriet Isabel Flower (born 1960) is a Swiss-American classicist and historian of ancient Rome. She was the Andrew Fleming West Professor of Classics at Princeton University, where she taught from 2003 until her retirement in 2026. A specialist in Roman history, historiography, and epigraphy, Flower has published on subjects ranging from Roman aristocratic commemorative culture to the periodization of the Roman Republic, local religion, and the lives of educated slaves and freedmen.

A 2022 citation-impact survey of active and retired ancient historians in North America ranked Flower tenth overall and the only woman among the top twenty scholars.

== Early life and education ==
Harriet Isabel Flower was born in Switzerland and moved to the United Kingdom for secondary school. She subsequently attended the University of Oxford as a member of the first cohort of women admitted to University College, where she read ancient history and classical literature (Greats), receiving a Bachelor of Arts in 1983 and a Master of Arts thereafter.

She then moved to the United States, initially teaching at the University of Rhode Island in the spring of 1984 before taking a position as Latin teacher and head of the department at the Lincoln School, an all-girls preparatory school in Providence, Rhode Island, where she taught from 1984 to 1986. She went on to earn a Ph.D. in ancient history from the University of Pennsylvania in 1993, supervised by Roman historian Robert E. A. Palmer, with a dissertation titled Imagines Maiorum: Ancestral Masks as Symbols of Ideology and Power.

== Academic career ==
In 1994, Flower joined the classics faculty of Franklin & Marshall College in Lancaster, Pennsylvania, together with her husband, classicist Michael A. Flower, with whom she initially shared a single teaching position. She was promoted to associate professor and received tenure in 2000, and chaired the college's Women's Studies Program.

Flower moved to Princeton University in 2003 as an associate professor of classics, was promoted to full professor in 2007, and was named to the Andrew Fleming West Chair in 2017. She served as head of Mathey College, one of Princeton's residential colleges, from 2010 to 2018, and as clerk of the university faculty from 2019 to 2025. She has also held a number of visiting appointments, including as an NEH Fellow and member of the Institute for Advanced Study (2001–02), a visiting scholar at the American Academy in Rome (2006), the E. T. Salmon Visiting Professor at McMaster University (2011), a corresponding member of the German Archaeological Institute (elected 2008), a visiting professor at the Paris 1 Panthéon-Sorbonne University (2024), and a visiting instructor at the University of Basel (2025).

Flower transferred to emeritus status in 2026, alongside her husband, Michael Flower, by then the David Magie '97 Class of 1897 Professor of Classics. That April, Princeton sponsored a retirement conference in the couple's honor, titled Floralia, at which sixteen former doctoral advisees of the Flowers from both Princeton and Franklin & Marshall presented papers.

== Research ==
=== Roman commemorative culture and memory ===
Flower's first book, Ancestor Masks and Aristocratic Power in Roman Culture (Clarendon Press, 1996), grew out of her doctoral dissertation and became the standard treatment of the wax portrait masks (imagines) displayed and worn at the funerals of Rome's office-holding elite, tracing their legal, social, and political significance from the third century BC to late antiquity. A reviewer in Choice called the book an important contribution to the study of Roman family history and power politics.

Her second monograph, The Art of Forgetting: Disgrace and Oblivion in Roman Political Culture (University of North Carolina Press, 2006), turned to the opposite phenomenon: Roman efforts to suppress or erase the memory of disgraced individuals, from the destruction of portraits and inscriptions to the condemnation of emperors. The book argued that literary accounts of these memory sanctions needed to be read together with the surviving material and epigraphic record, and traced the practice from the early Republic through the reign of Hadrian.

=== Periodization of the Roman Republic ===
Roman Republics (Princeton University Press, 2010) has been described by Flower's colleagues as a turning point in her career. Rejecting the conventional model of a single continuous Roman Republic lasting from the traditional expulsion of the kings around 509 BC to the rise of one-man rule under Augustus, Flower argued that Roman republican government is better understood as a sequence of several distinct "republics," each with its own institutions and characteristic problems, punctuated by the reforms of the dictator Sulla and by the periods of triumviral and one-person rule in the 60s to 30s BC. Reviewing the book for the Journal of Roman Studies, John Rich credited Flower with challenging traditional approaches to republican chronology, while a Bryn Mawr Classical Review notice deemed the book likely to revitalize study of the period.

=== Non-elite Roman religion and life ===
Beginning her term as head of Mathey College in the same year that Roman Republics appeared, Flower spent the following years researching and writing The Dancing Lares and the Serpent in the Garden: Religion at the Roman Street Corner (Princeton University Press, 2017), a study of the cult of the Lares and the Genius, household and neighborhood divinities whose nature was debated by the Romans themselves. Drawing on literary, epigraphic, and archaeological evidence, the book emphasized the central role played by ordinary Romans—including slaves and freedpersons—in maintaining local cult practice. The book received the Society for Classical Studies' Charles J. Goodwin Award of Merit in 2018.

The Dancing Lares also marked the beginning of a sustained interest in the lives of non-elite Romans, which Flower pursued in several articles culminating in her fifth monograph, Intellectual Property: Learned Slaves and Educated Freedmen in Republican Rome (Princeton University Press, 2025). The book examines the careers of enslaved and formerly enslaved intellectuals in Rome during the second and first centuries BC—including tutors, secretaries, and scholars such as the grammarian Tyrannion of Amisus—arguing for their central, if largely uncredited, role in the literary and rhetorical culture of the late Republic's political elite.

== Teaching and mentorship ==
Flower received Princeton's Graduate Mentoring Award from the McGraw Center for Teaching and Learning in 2016. Her doctoral students at Princeton and Franklin & Marshall have gone on to faculty positions at institutions including the University of Victoria, the University of California, Santa Barbara, Indiana University, Hunter College, and the University of Delaware, among others. Her mentorship of younger scholars was highlighted at the 2026 Floralia conference marking her retirement, where former advisees from across her career presented research in her honor.

== Professional service ==
Within the Society for Classical Studies (formerly the American Philological Association), Flower served on the Program Committee (2004–06) and on the Charles J. Goodwin Award Committee (2020–23). She has served on the advisory board of the journal Klio: Beiträge zur Alten Geschichte since 2018, and in 2013 was a juror for the Rome Prize. She has also served on the advisory board of an ERC-funded research project on the fragmentary Republican Roman orators (University of Glasgow) and, in 2023, on an external review committee for the Corpus Inscriptionum Latinarum convened by the Berlin-Brandenburg Academy of Sciences.

== Honors and awards ==
- National Endowment for the Humanities Fellowship and Membership, Institute for Advanced Study (2001–02)
- Visiting Scholar, American Academy in Rome (2006)
- Corresponding Member, German Archaeological Institute (elected 2008)
- Graduate Mentoring Award, Princeton University (2016)
- Charles J. Goodwin Award of Merit, Society for Classical Studies, for The Dancing Lares and the Serpent in the Garden (2018)
- Howard T. Behrman Award for Distinguished Achievement in the Humanities, Princeton University (2018)

== Personal life ==
Flower is married to fellow classicist Michael A. Flower, a historian of ancient Greece and the David Magie '97 Class of 1897 Professor of Classics at Princeton, whom she met before the two joined Franklin & Marshall College together in 1994. Following their joint transfer to emeritus status in 2026, the couple relocated to Santa Fe, New Mexico.

== Selected publications ==
- Ancestor Masks and Aristocratic Power in Roman Culture. Oxford: Clarendon Press, 1996.
- The Art of Forgetting: Disgrace and Oblivion in Roman Political Culture. Chapel Hill: University of North Carolina Press, 2006.
- The Cambridge Companion to the Roman Republic (editor). Cambridge: Cambridge University Press, 2004; expanded ed. 2014.
- East and West: Papers in Ancient History Presented to Glen W. Bowersock (co-editor with T. Corey Brennan). Cambridge, MA: Department of the Classics, Harvard University, 2008.
- Roman Republics. Princeton: Princeton University Press, 2010.
- The Dancing Lares and the Serpent in the Garden: Religion at the Roman Street Corner. Princeton: Princeton University Press, 2017.
- Empire and Religion in the Roman World (editor). Cambridge: Cambridge University Press, 2021.
- Intellectual Property: Learned Slaves and Educated Freedmen in Republican Rome. Princeton: Princeton University Press, 2025.
