= Esther Eidinow =

British classical historian and academic (born 1970)

Esther Eidinow FBA
- Born: 1970 (age 55–56)

Academic background
- Education: University of Oxford
- Thesis: Exploring risk among the ancient Greeks: prolegomena and two case studies (2003)
- Doctoral advisor: Robert Parker

Academic work
- Discipline: Ancient History
- Sub-discipline: Ancient Greek religion; Magic in the Graeco-Roman world
- Institutions: University of Nottingham; University of Bristol

Esther Eidinow FBA (born 1970) is a British ancient historian and academic. She specialises in ancient Greece, particularly ancient Greek religion and magic. She has been Professor of Ancient History at the University of Bristol since 2017.

== Career ==
Before becoming an academic, Eidinow spent a decade working as a scenario planning writer. In 2003, Eidinow was awarded a Doctor of Philosophy (DPhil) for a thesis entitled Exploring risk among the ancient Greeks: prolegomena and two case studies. Her doctoral research was completed at the University of Oxford under the supervision of Robert Parker. A monograph based on the thesis, Oracles, Curses and Risk Among the Ancient Greeks, was published in 2007. It was described by reviewer Aaron Kachuck as accessible and filled with "analytic rigor".

From 2011 to 2012, Eidinow was a Solmsen Fellow at the Institute for Research in the Humanities of the University of Wisconsin–Madison. Between 2017 and 2018 she was a visiting fellow at the Davis Center for Historical Studies of Princeton University. Since 2017, she has held the Chair in Ancient History at the University of Bristol. She was previously a lecturer at Newman University College and at the University of Nottingham. She was awarded a Philip Leverhulme Prize in 2015, and was described as "an original and powerful new voice in the field of ancient Greek history". From 2020 to 2023, she led the Virtual Reality Oracle Project, funded by the Arts and Humanities Research Council, using virtual reality to recreate the experience of visiting Dodona, an ancient Greek oracle of Zeus. In July 2024 she was elected as a Fellow of the British Academy.

== Selected works ==
- Eidinow, Esther (2007). Oracles, Curses, and Risk Among the Ancient Greeks. Oxford: Oxford University Press. ISBN 978-0199277780.
- Eidinow, Esther (2011). Luck, Fate, and Fortune: Antiquity and its Legacy. Oxford: Oxford University Press. ISBN 978-0195380798.
- Hornblower, Simon; Spawforth, Antony; Eidinow, Esther, eds. (2012). The Oxford Classical Dictionary (4th ed.). Oxford: Oxford University Press. ISBN 978-0199545568.
- Hornblower, Simon; Spawforth, Antony; Eidinow, Esther, eds. (2014). The Oxford Companion to Classical Civilization (2nd ed.). Oxford: Oxford University Press. ISBN 978-0198706779.
- Eidinow, Esther (2015). Envy, Poison, and Death: Women on Trial in Classical Athens. Oxford: Oxford University Press. ISBN 978-0199562602.
- Eidinow, Esther; Kindt, Julia, eds. (2015). The Oxford Handbook of Ancient Greek Religion. Oxford: Oxford University Press. ISBN 978-0199642038.
- Eidinow, Esther; Kindt, Julia; Osborne, Robin, eds. (2016). Theologies of Ancient Greek Religion. Cambridge: Cambridge University Press. ISBN 978-1107153479.
- Dillon, Matthew; Eidinow, Esther; Maurizio, Lisa, eds. (2016). Women's Ritual Competence in the Greco-Roman Mediterranean. London: Routledge. ISBN 978-1472478900.
- Driediger-Murphy, Lindsay; Eidinow, Esther, eds. (2019). Ancient Divination and Experience. Oxford: Oxford University Press. ISBN 978-0198844549.
- Eidinow, Esther, and Lisa Maurizio, eds. (2020) Narratives of Time and Gender in Antiquity London: Routledge.
- Eidinow, Esther; Geertz, Armin W.; North, John, eds. (2022). Cognitive Approaches to Ancient Religious Experience. Cambridge: Cambridge University Press. ISBN 978-1-316-51533-4. doi:10.1017/9781009019927.
- Eidinow, Esther; Schliephake, Christopher, eds. (2024). Conversing with Chaos: Writing and Reading Environmental Disorder in Ancient Texts. London: Bloomsbury. ISBN 978-1-350-34419-8.
- Eidinow, Esther; Gordon, Richard, eds. (2025). A Cultural History of Ancient Magic. Volume 1: Antiquity. London: Bloomsbury. ISBN 978-1-350-12379-3.
- Eidinow, Esther (2025). Metamorphosis, Landscape, and Trauma in Greco-Roman Myth. Oxford: Oxford University Press. ISBN 978-0-19-880773-5. doi:10.1093/9780191845550.001.0001.
- Eidinow, Esther; Bowden, Hugh, eds. (2026). Visiting the Oracle at Dodona: Contexts of Unknowing in Ancient Greek Religion. Cambridge: Cambridge University Press. ISBN 978-1-009-63224-9. doi:10.1017/9781009632218.
