= Barbara Graziosi =

Italian classicist and academic

- Born: Trieste, Italy

Academic background
- Education: University of Oxford; University of Cambridge
- Thesis: Inventing the poet: a study of the early reception of the Homeric poems (1999)
- Doctoral advisor: P. E. Easterling

Academic work
- Discipline: Classical studies
- Sub-discipline: Ancient Greek literature
- Institutions: New College, Oxford; University of Reading; Durham University; Princeton University

Barbara Graziosi is an Italian classicist and academic. She is Ewing Professor of Greek at Princeton University. Her interests lie in ancient Greek literature, and the way in which readers make it their own. She has written extensively on the subject of Homeric literature, in particular the Iliad, and more generally on the transition of the Twelve Olympians from antiquity to the Renaissance. Her most recent research was a project entitled 'Living Poets: A New Approach to Ancient Poetry, which was funded by the European Research Council.

== Early life and education ==
Barbara was born in Trieste, Italy, and lived there until she was 17. She attended a local liceo classico, and then the United World College of the Adriatic. Having been granted a local government scholarship, she studied Literae Humaniores at Corpus Christi College, Oxford in England. She graduated from the University of Oxford with a first class Bachelor of Arts (BA) degree in 1995. She remained at Oxford and completed a Master of Studies (MSt) degree in 1996.

Having been granted a graduate scholarship, Graziosi moved to the University of Cambridge to undertake postgraduate research at Magdalene College. She completed her Doctor of Philosophy (PhD) degree in 1999. Her doctoral supervisor was P. E. Easterling, and her thesis was titled "Inventing the poet: a study of the early reception of the Homeric poems".

== Career ==
After a brief spell back in Oxford, as a Cox Junior Research Fellow at New College, and then in Reading, as a lecturer in Greek Literature, she settled in Durham in 2001, first as a Lecturer, and then as a Senior Lecturer in Classics. She is also a doctorate supervisor for the university.

In 2003, she was awarded a National Teaching Fellowship. Also in 2003, she was a Summer Fellow at the Center for Hellenic Studies, Washington, D.C. (under the umbrella of Harvard University).

In 2018 she joined the classics faculty at Princeton University.

She has also been consulted on her work on a number of popular radio stations and television shows, including: discussing the Iliad with poets Carol Ann Duffy and Ruth Padel (BBC Radio 3, Proms Interval Talks), assessing the discovery of the Oxyrhynchus Papyri together with a team of classicists, scientists and journalists (on BBC Channel 4 and Channel 2); arguing about the location of Ithaca with Quentin Cooper and John Underhill (Material World, BBC Radio 4), discussing her work with Bill Buschel on US Public Radio, and talking about Homer and Sappho on BBC Radio 3 (The Essay: Greek and Latin Voices).

== Publications ==
=== Author ===
- Homer. (Oxford University Press: 2016).
- The Gods of Olympus: A History. (Profile Books: 2013).
- (with Johannes Haubold) Homer: Iliad Book VI. Cambridge University Press: 2010).
- (with Johannes Haubold) Homer: The Resonance of Epic. (Duckworth: 2005)
- Inventing Homer: The Early Reception of Epic. Cambridge University Press: 2002)

=== Chapter in book ===
- 'Theologies of the family in Homer and Hesiod', Theologies of Ancient Greek Religion. Eidinow, Esther, Kindt, Julia & Osborne, Robin Cambridge: Cambridge University Press. 35–61 (2016).
- Vivere da poeti. In L'esilio della bellezza. Camerotto, A. & Pontani, F. Mimesis. 125-38 (2014).
- 'The poet in the Iliad'. In The author's voice in classical and late antiquity. Hill, J. & Marmodoro, A. Oxford: Oxford University Press. 9–38 (2013).
- 'Hesiod in Classical Athens: Orators and Platonic Discourse'. In Plato and Hesiod. Boys-Stones, G. & Haubold, J. H. Oxford: 111–132 (2010).
- 'Commentaries'. In The Oxford Handbook of Hellenic Studies. Oxford: Oxford University Press. 788–801 (2009).
- 'Horace, Suetonius and the Lives of the Greek Poets'. In Perceptions of Horace: A Roman Poet and His Readers. Houghton, L. & Wyke, M. Cambridge: Cambridge University Press. 140–160 (2009).
- (with Johannes Haubold) . 'Greek Lyric and Early Greek Literary History'. In The Cambridge Companion to Greek Lyric Poetry. Budelmann, F. Cambridge University Press. 95–113 (2007).
- 'Homer in Albania: the geography of literature'. In Homer in the Twentieth Century: Between World Literature and the Western Canon. Graziosi, Barbara & Greenwood, Emily Oxford: Oxford University Press (2007).
- 'The ancient reception of Homer'. In The Blackwell Companion to Classical Receptions. Hardwick, L. & Stray, C. Oxford (2007).
- 'L'autore e l'opera nella tradizione biografica greca'. In L'autore e l'opera nella Grecia antica. Lanza, D. & Roscalla, F. Pavia (2006).
- 'Homer: Die Erfindung des Authors'. In Mythen Europas: Schluesselfigurern der Imagination. Hartmann, A. & Neumann, M. Regensburg: Pusted Verlag. 44–65 (2004).
- 'La definizione dell'opera omerica nel periodo arcaico e classico'. In Momenti della ricezione omerica: poesia arcaica e teatro. Zanetto, G., Canavero, D., Capra, A. & Sgobbi, A. Milan: Cisalpino. 2–17 (2004).
- 'Competition in Wisdom'. In Homer, tragedy and beyond essays in honour of P.E. Easterling. Budelmann, F. & Michelakis, P. London: Society for the Promotion of Hellenic Studies. 57–74 (2001).

=== Edited book ===
- Boystones, George, Graziosi, Barbara & Vasunia, Phiroze. The Oxford Handbook of Hellenic Studies. (Oxford University Press: 2009).
- Graziosi, Barbara & Greenwood, Emily. Homer in the Twentieth Century: Between World Literature and the Western Canon. Classical Presences. (Oxford University Press: 2007).

=== Journal articles ===
- ‘On Seeing the poet: Arabic, Italian and Byzantine portraits of Homer’. Scandinavian Journal of Byzantine and Modern Greek Studies 1: 25–47 (2015).
- ‘Homer: from reception to composition’. Letras Clássicas 14: 21–33 (2014).
- (With Carol Ann Duffy) Homeric encounters. Omnibus 6–8 (2005).
- (With Johannes Haubold) 'Homeric Masculinity: ΗΝΟΡΕΗ and ΑΓΗΝΟΡΙΗ'. Journal of Hellenic Studies 123: 60–76 (2003).
- Gods and poets in the Odyssey. Omnibus 43: 4–6 (2002).
- Homer, espionage and Albanian complexities. Omnibus 41: 6 (2001).
- P.Oxy.4569. 'Demosthenes XIX 1–7, 9–13, 208–22, 309–10, 314–15'. Papyri of Oxyrhynchus 67: 66–80 (2001).
- Per uno studio di Omero tra il sesto e il quarto secolo. Posthomerica 3: 7–22 (2001).
