= Gregory Vlastos =

Greek scholar of ancient philosophy (1907–1991)

- Born: July 27, 1907; Constantinople, Ottoman Empire (present-day Istanbul, Turkey)
- Died: October 12, 1991 (aged 84); Berkeley, California, U.S.

Education
- Education: Chicago Theological Seminary; Harvard University
- Doctoral advisor: Alfred North Whitehead

Philosophical work
- Era: Contemporary philosophy
- Region: Western philosophy
- School: Analytic philosophy
- Doctoral students: Terence Irwin, Richard Kraut, Alexander Nehamas, Paul Woodruff, Gerasimos Santas
- Main interests: Ancient Philosophy Ethics
- Notable ideas: Socratic philosophy as distinct from what is commonly known as Platonism

Gregory Vlastos (/ˈvlæstoʊs/; Greek: Γρηγόριος Βλαστός; July 27, 1907 – October 12, 1991) was a preeminent scholar of ancient philosophy, and author of many works on Plato and Socrates. He transformed the analysis of classical philosophy by applying techniques of modern analytic philosophy to restate and evaluate the views of Socrates and Plato.

== Biography ==
=== Early life and education ===
Vlastos was born in Istanbul (then Constantinople), to a Scottish mother and a Greek father, Kimon Vlastos (his parents later moved to Brussels, Belgium). His father was associated with the Imperial Ottoman Bank in Instanbul before the revolution. In Istanbul his parents belonged to a small sect of Greek Protestants and he received a Presbyterian Church upbringing. After graduating from Istanbul's American-sponsored school, Robert College, in 1925, he enrolled in the Chicago Theological Seminary, where he earned a Bachelor of Divinity in 1929. He was ordained a minister in the Congregational Church, but he never became a pastor. He attended graduate school in philosophy at Harvard University where he received a PhD in 1931. His dissertation, "God as a Metaphysical Concept," was supervised by Alfred North Whitehead. His teachers included Whitehead and Raphael Demos.

=== Career ===
Vlastos accepted a position at Queen's University in Kingston, Ontario, Canada in 1931. While there, he wrote two books and edited a third book, all concerning Christianity. In 1938 he had completed a manuscript of 30,000 words on "Religion and the State in Plato," which he never published. His first articles were for the journal Christendom ("What Is Love?" (1935) and "Jesus's Conflict with the Pharisees" (1937)). He also published "Organic Categories in Whitehead" in the Journal of Philosophy (1937).

His first articles in ancient philosophy were published during these years. They included “The Disorderly Motion in the Timaeus” (1939) in Classical Quarterly and “Slavery in Plato’s Thought,” in the Philosophical Review (1941). He published more articles in ancient philosophy after the war, including “Ethics and Physics in Democritus I” and “Ethics and Physics in Democritus II” in the Philosophical Review (1945 and 1946) and "Equality and Justice in Early Greek Cosmologies" in Classical Philology (1947).

In 1948, Vlastos moved to Cornell University. His publications included "The Physical Theory of Anaxagoras" (Philosophical Review (1950)) and "Theology and Philosophy in Early Greek Thought" (Philosophical Quarterly (1952). While there he produced his first book-length study of Socrates, which, like his earlier book on Plato, he withheld from publication.

In 1954–1955 he was a fellow at the Institute for Advanced Study at Princeton. While there he published “The Third Man Argument in the Parmenides” in the Philosophical Review in 1954. According to Alexander Phoebus Dionysiou Mourelatos, the middle and late 1950s saw a revolution in the study of ancient Greek philosophy: “The techniques of rigorous analysis and formal modeling that philosophers had applied ahistorically to the study of philosophical concepts and arguments came to be applied to the analysis of Greek philosophical texts. . . . In North America, the revolution had a single precipitating event and a single instigator: the publication in July 1954 in the Philosophical Review of ‘The Third Man Argument in the Parmenides’ by Gregory Vlastos.” Vlastos himself said that his 1954 paper "was to prove the most relentlessly rebutted monograph of the fifties in its field." About his transformation of the analysis of classical philosophy Terence Irwin (who wrote his dissertation on Plato under Vlastos at Princeton) has written: "He always insisted on close linguistic and philological analysis, and emphasised the importance of close examination of the logical structure of particular arguments. But he didn't do this out of some partisan allegiance to (so-called) 'analytic' philosophy, or because he was uninterested in the broader ethical philosophical and religious questions that arouse our interest in Plato in the first place. On the contrary, Vlastos's work shows that the demand for rigour and clarity need not result in narrowness or pedantry; that historical and philosophical reflection can illuminate questions of immediate ethical interest, both personal and social; and that scholarly writing need not appear inaccessible or unattractive to the non-specialised reader."

In 1955 he became the Stuart Professor of Philosophy at Princeton University, a position which he held until 1976. He was twice chair of the Department of Philosophy and was a member of the "Committee of Three" for tenure and promotion at Princeton. He cofounded the Princeton Program in Classical Philosophy with Whitney J. Oates. He also helped created the National Humanities Center and the Council for Philosophical Studies. He participated in negotiations leading to the creation of the National Endowment for the Humanities. During his time at Princeton he edited the translation Plato's "Protagoras" by Benjamin Jowett (1956) and published "The Paradox of Socrates" (Queen's Quarterly, 1958) as well as the edited collection The Philosophy of Socrates (1971). He also published the much-anthologized essay, "Justice and Equality" (1962). In 1975 he published Plato's Universe.

Upon his retirement from Princeton in 1976, Vlastos taught as Mills Professor of Philosophy at University of California, Berkeley until 1987. He was a visiting faculty member at the University of Toronto in 1978 and at the University of Cambridge in 1983-1984. He gave the Gifford Lectures at St. Andrews University in 1981. In 1986 he gave the Prescott W. Townsend Memorial Lectures at Cornell which were later published in the Cornell Studies in Classical Philology series as Socrates, Ironist and Moral Philosopher, in 1991, months before he passed away. In 1988 he gave the British Academy's Master-Mind Lecture. He received a MacArthur Foundation Fellowship in 1990. At the time, he was the oldest person to win a MacArthur award. He was twice awarded a Guggenheim Fellowship, was a fellow of the American Academy of Arts and Sciences, a corresponding fellow of the British Academy, and a member of the American Philosophical Society. At the time of his death, he was finishing a new compilation of essays on Socratic philosophy, Socratic Studies, which was published posthumously in 1994, edited by Myles Burnyeat.

=== Personal life ===
Vlastos married Vernon Abbott Ladd ('Val' to family and friends) on December 16, 1932. She made her debut in 1927 when she became a member of the Vincent Club and the Junior League. She graduated from Vassar College in 1930 and won a fellowship to study the philosophy of religion at the University of Chicago and Radcliffe College. At their wedding, Vlastos's best man was Morris B. Storer, instructor in philosophy at Dartmouth College. According to the New York Times, for their honeymoon the bridal couple "will tour the mountains by motor and will also attend the conference in philosophy at Bryn Mawr, to which they have been invited."

While in Ontario, Canada, the couple became active in causes on the political left, especially through the movement of Christian Socialism. During World War II Vlastos served in the Canadian Air Force. In 1971 he gave up his Canadian citizenship to become a U.S. citizen and protest against the Vietnam War.

They had two children: Stephen Vlastos and Margaret Vlastos.

He died in 1991, aged 84, from bone cancer.

== Philosophical work ==
Vlastos is credited with bringing about a renaissance of interest in Plato among philosophers throughout the world. Many of his students have become important scholars of ancient philosophy, including Terence Irwin, Richard Kraut, Paul Woodruff, and Alexander Nehamas.

=== Theory of Socratic philosophy ===
In his work The Philosophy of Socrates: a Collection of Critical Essays (UNDP 1971), Vlastos advanced the idea "that one can identify in certain Platonic dialogues a philosophical method and a collection of philosophical theses which may properly be attributed to Socrates." He suggested a plausible modern analytic framework for Socratic philosophy as a pursuit distinct from Platonic philosophy. The dialogues of Plato’s Socratic period, called "elenctic dialogues" for Socrates’s preferred method of questioning, are Apology, Charmides, Crito, Euthyphro, Gorgias, Hippias Minor, Ion, Laches, Protagoras and book 1 of the Republic. The idea remains controversial and those who agree with his position are referred to as Vlastosians.

== Works ==
- The Religious Way, Woman's Press, 1934.
- Christian Faith and Democracy, Association Press, 1939.
- The Philosophy of Socrates: A Collection of Critical Essays, University of Notre Dame Press, 1971.
- Platonic Studies, Princeton University Press, 1973, ISBN 978-0-691-07162-6 ISBN 0691071624; 1981, 2nd edition, pbk
- Plato's Universe, Claredon Press, 1975.
- Socrates, Ironist and Moral Philosopher, Cornell University Press, 1991, ISBN 978-0-8014-9787-2 ISBN 0801497876
- Socratic Studies, Cambridge University Press, 1994, ISBN 978-0-521-44735-5 ISBN 0521447356; 1995 pbk reprint
- Studies in Greek Philosophy Volume I: the Presocratics, Princeton University Press, 1995, ISBN 978-0-691-03310-5 ISBN 0691033102
- Studies in Greek Philosophy; Volume II: Socrates, Plato, and Their Tradition, Princeton University Press, 1995, ISBN 978-0-691-03311-2 ISBN 0691033110

=== Edited ===
- Towards the Christian Revolution - with R.B.Y. Scott, Willett, Clark & Company, 1936.
- Plato, a Collection of Critical Essays: I, Metaphysics and Epistemology; II, Ethics, Politics, and Philosophy of Art and Religion. Anchor Books / Doubleday and Company, 1971
- The Philosophy of Socrates: a Collection of Critical Essays, Anchor, 1971. New ed., (Modern Studies in Philosophy), University of Notre Dame Press, 1980, ISBN 978-0-268-01537-4 ISBN 0268015376

== See also ==
- Harold F. Cherniss, for the Cherniss-Vlastos critique of the Tübingen School
