= The Ethereal Rock =

- Short story by Pu Songling
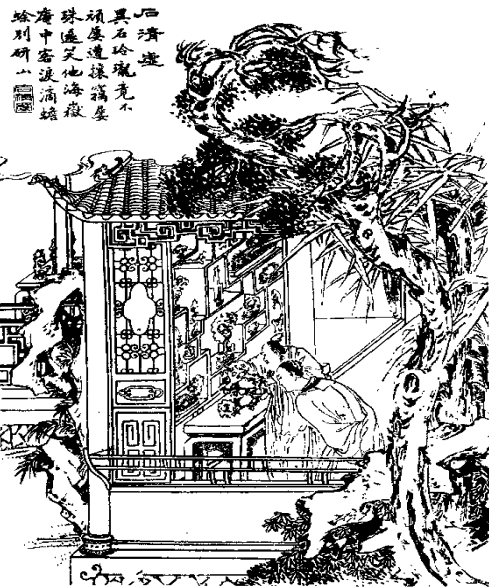
- 19th-century illustration from Xiangzhu liaozhai zhiyi tuyong (Liaozhai Zhiyi with commentary and illustrations; 1886)
- Original title: 石清虛 (Shi Qingxu)
- Translator: Herbert Giles (1880); Judith T. Zeitlin (1993)
- Country: Qing China
- Language: Chinese
- Genre(s): Chuanqi

Publication
- Published in: Strange Stories from a Chinese Studio
- Publication type: Anthology
- Publication date: c. 1740

Chronology
Young Master Wei (韋公子)	Zeng Youyu (曾友於)

"The Ethereal Rock" (traditional Chinese: 石清虛; simplified Chinese: 石清虚; pinyin: Shí Qīngxū) is a short story by Pu Songling first published in his eighteenth-century anthology Strange Tales from a Chinese Studio. Revolving around the life of a rock collector after he acquires an extraordinary rock, the story was first translated into English by Herbert Giles in 1880.

== Plot ==
Shuntian native Xing Yunfei (邢雲飛) is an avid rock collector who discovers a mountain-shaped rock while fishing. He returns home and displays the rock—which emits mist whenever it is about to rain—on his desk. An unnamed wealthy individual orders his servant to rob Xing of his rock. Xing is unable to stop the servant, who in turn accidentally drops the rock into a river while fleeing from Xing. Many people, including trained swimmers hired by the rich man, unsuccessfully attempt to find the rock.

Some time later, Xing passes by the same river. The water suddenly turns transparent, allowing Xing to pinpoint the location of the rock. After retrieving the rock, Xing decides that he will lock it up for safekeeping, instead of displaying it on his desk like before.

One day, he is visited by an old man, who asks to see the rock. Xing lies that the rock has gone missing for a long time and invites the old man into his study to see for himself, only to find that the rock has somehow materialised on his desk. The old man explains that the rock belongs to his family and that it has 92 cavities, the largest of which bears the inscription Qingxu tianshi gong (清虛天石供). (Note: Translated into English as "Offered in Worship: Ethereal, the Celestial Rock" or "Offered by Pure Emptiness Celestial Rock".)

Xing declines to return the rock to the old man, but it disappears from his study as soon as he leaves. Xing races after the old man—whom he deduces to be a deity—and begs him to grant him ownership of the rock. The old man tells Xing that the rock "was in a hurry to display itself" and "emerged too early so that his demonic power has not yet been eradicated". However, Xing may keep the rock by forfeiting three years of his own life.

Xing agrees and the old man closes three of the rock's cavities with his hand, before informing Xing that the remaining number of cavities—89—represents the years of his life. Slightly more than a year later, Xing's house is looted while he is away on a business trip, although only the rock is taken. Years go by without any news of the rock's whereabouts, until Xing serendipitously discovers it at a rock booth at Baoguo Temple (報國寺). A dispute over the rock's ownership ensues and the matter is taken to court. The rock merchant insists that the rock belongs to him but he is only able to say how many cavities it has. On the other hand, Xing points out both the inscription on the rock's largest cavity as well as the three fingerprints left behind by the old man.

After the county magistrate grants him custody of the rock, Xing wraps it in brocade and hides it in a box. From then on, Xing only occasionally takes the rock out to admire—even then, he must burn some rare incense first. A certain minister offers to buy Xing's rock for a hundred pieces of gold, but Xing maintains that he would not sell it even for ten thousand pieces of gold. The minister subsequently orchestrates Xing's arrest on trumped-up charges; Xing is only released from prison after his wife and son hand over the rock to the minister without Xing's consent.

Xing becomes suicidal but is visited by a certain Shi Qingxu (石清虛) in his dreams. Shi urges him not to despair and instructs him to "redeem me for two strings of cash" at the Haidai Gate (海岱門) on the twentieth day of the eight month of the following year. In the meantime, the rock—now at the minister's household—has ceased to emit mist. A year passes and the minister is sentenced to death after being found guilty of corruption. Xing arrives at the appointed place, where he finds a member of the minister's household selling the rock for two strings of cash.

Xing dies aged 89 and is buried with the rock. Around half a year later, the rock is stolen by tomb raiders. However, after apparently being haunted by Xing's ghost, they turn themselves in some two or three months afterwards. The county magistrate in charge of their case confiscates the rock and orders it to be displayed at his study. As his servants are lifting it up, the rock plummets to the ground and disintegrates into innumerable pieces. The tomb raiders are sentenced to death and Xing's son deposits the rock fragments into his father's tomb.

The Historian of the Strange (Note: Yishi shi (異史氏), Pu Songling's nom-de-plume.) remarks in his postscript: "Unearthly beauty in a thing makes it the site of calamity. In this man's desire to sacrifice his life for the rock, wasn't his folly extreme! But in the end, man and rock were together in death, so who can say the rock was 'unfeeling'? There's an old saying, 'A knight will die for a true friend.' This is no lie. If it is true even for a rock, can it be any less true for men?" (Note: In Chinese: 物之尤者禍之府。至欲以身殉石，亦癡甚矣！而卒之石與人相終始，誰謂石無情哉？古人云士為知己者死，非過也，石猶如此，而況人乎!)

== Publication ==
Originally titled Shi Qingxu (石清虛), the story was first published in Pu Songling's 18th-century anthology of nearly five hundred short stories, titled Liaozhai zhiyi or Strange Tales from a Chinese Studio. In addition to Shi Qingxu, Pu also authored several rock-themed poems and a catalogue of rocks.

The story was included in the first volume of Strange Stories from a Chinese Studio (1880) — widely regarded as the earliest substantial translation of Liaozhai zhiyi—by British sinologist Herbert Giles, who titled the story "The Wonderful Stone". Judith T. Zeitlin, whose own English translation of the story, titled The Ethereal Rock, was published in 1993, comments that "it is extremely interesting ... that Giles, writing for a turn-of-the-century English audience, tried to make sense of the Chinese obsession with rocks in terms of a scientific passion."

== Analysis ==
The story, which "details the reciprocal love between a collector of rocks and a prized rock that takes on another incarnation as a young man", draws heavily on the concept of pi (癖), "an important Chinese cultural construct that underwent a long development and reached its height of influence during the late Ming and early Qing dynasties." The term pi originally referred to "an obstruction within the digestive track"; according to the mid-eighth century medical manual Waitai biyao, a pi could even become stone-like. In the Ming dynasty, however, the term pi became more popularly understood to refer to obsession or addiction. Attempting to reconcile both uses of the term pi, Li Shizhen wrote in his Bencao gangmu, "There are people who concentrate on something until it becomes an obsession (pi). When this develops into an illness, knots in their bowels will solidify and form a stone..."

Echoing Qing dynasty critic Feng Zhenluan's description of the story's protagonist as shichi (石癡, literally "rock-crazy"), Aude Lucas contends that Xing Yunfei "presents symptoms that are analogous to a case of psychosis." Sophie Volpp remarks that the story "beautifully encapsulates the psychology of obsession that underlies the affective bonds between connoisseur." According to Judith T. Zeitlin, "the most obvious inspiration behind Pu Songling's rock-loving hero is the Song painter and calligrapher Mi Fu, whose obsession with rocks had become proverbial."
