= William Kelly Prentice =

American classicist (1871–19643)

William K. Prentice
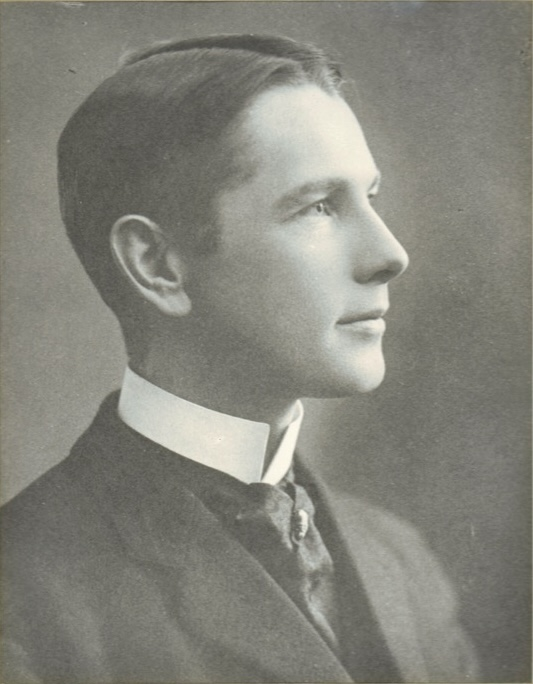
- Born: October 28, 1871; New York City, New York, U.S.
- Died: December 13, 1964 (aged 93); Princeton, New Jersey, U.S.

Academic background
- Education: Princeton University (A.B., A.M.); University of Halle (Ph.D.)
- Thesis: De Bacchylide Pindari artis socio et imitatore

Academic work
- Institutions: Princeton University

William Kelly Prentice (October 28, 1871 – December 13, 1964) was an American classical philologist. An expert on classical inscriptions, he served as Ewing Professor of Greek at Princeton University.

== Biography ==
William Kelly Prentice was born in New York City in 1871, the son of Florence Kelly and lawyer William Packer Prentice, a Civil War veteran who had served as chief of staff to General Ormsby M. Mitchel. His paternal grandfather, Ezra P. Prentice, was president of the National Commercial Bank in Albany and the Albany and Susquehanna Railroad.

Enrolling at Princeton University at age sixteen, Prentice graduated with a bachelor's degree in Classics in 1892 as valedictorian of his class. He then taught for a year at the Lawrenceville School, before furthering his studies at Princeton Theological Seminary and the University of Marburg. In 1894, he was appointed a lecturer at Princeton University, where he earned his master's degree in 1895.

From 1897 to 1899, Prentice undertook a period of study at the University of Halle, where he received his doctorate in 1900. While in Halle, he befriended the German orientalist Enno Littmann, a collaboration that led to their joint participation in Princeton's first archaeological expedition to Syria in 1900, led by Howard Crosby Butler. They also took part in Butler's second Syrian expedition, from 1904 to 1905. Prentice's epigraphic publications from the American Archaeological Expeditions to Syria are considered his most important works.

Prentice returned to Princeton as a professor of Greek in 1900, a post he would occupy for the next forty years. He served as Visiting Professor at the American School of Classical Studies in Athens in 1908–1909, and as the seventh Sather Professor at the University of California, Berkeley. For his final two years at Princeton, Prentice occupied the Ewing Professorship of Greek Language and Literature, succeeding Edmund Yard Robbins.

== Personal life and death ==
After retiring in 1940, Prentice continued his research, publishing books on Greek tragedy and the genealogy of the Prentice family, which he traced back some eight generations. At the time of his death in 1963, he was the last surviving member of his undergraduate class.

Twice a widower, Prentice first married Aline B. Glenny, with whom he had one daughter. After her death in 1909, he married Maria B. Hamill, who died in 1952. He was survived by his younger brother, Ezra P. Prentice, a New York State Assemblyman. The Princeton University Classics Department's annual Prentice Lecture is held in his honor.

== Publications ==
- De Bacchylide Pindari artis socio et imitatore. Dissertation, Universität Halle 1900.
- Greek and Latin inscriptions (= Publications of an American Archaeological Expedition to Syria in 1899–1900. volume 3). Century, New York 1908.
- Greek and Latin Inscriptions. Section B: Northern Syria (= Syria. Publications of the Princeton University Archaeological Expeditions to Syria in 1904–5 and 1909. Division III, Section B). 6 volumes, Brill, Leiden 1908–1922 (Digitial Version).
- The Ancient Greeks. Studies toward a Better Understanding of the Ancient World. Princeton University Press, Princeton 1940.
- Those Ancient Dramas Called Tragedies. Princeton University Press, Princeton 1942.
- Eight Generations. The Ancestry, Education and Life of William Packer Prentice. Princeton 1947 (Digital Version).
