= Henry W. Prescott =

American classical scholar (1874–1943)

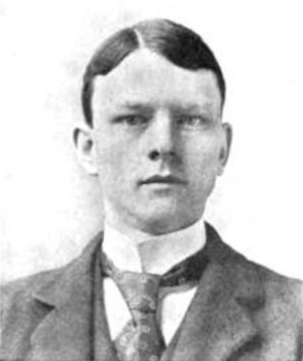
- Born: July 30, 1874; Boston, Massachusetts, U.S.
- Died: June 13, 1943 (aged 68); Berkeley, California, U.S.

Academic background
- Education: Harvard University (A.B., A.M., Ph.D.)
- Thesis: De Daphnide Commentatio

Academic work
- Institutions: University of California, Berkeley; University of Chicago; Princeton University

Henry Washington Prescott (July 30, 1874 – June 13, 1943) was an American classical philologist and professor of Latin, known for his contributions to the study of Hellenistic literature, Roman comedy, and Virgil. Over a long career at the University of Chicago and other institutions, he became a widely respected teacher, scholar, and mentor, and was regarded as an influential figure in twentieth-century classical studies.

== Early life and education ==
Prescott was born in Boston on July 30, 1874. He entered Harvard College in 1892, receiving his A.B. in 1895. After several years of teaching—one year at Trinity College in Hartford and two at Harvard—he completed his Ph.D. in 1901, also at Harvard.

== Academic career ==
Prescott joined the faculty of the University of California, Berkeley in 1901, moving in 1909 to the University of Chicago, where he taught for thirty-one years until his partial retirement in 1940. His career was marked by precocious advancement; as the second scholar appointed to the prestigious Sather Professorship of Classical Literature in 1915, Prescott had the distinction of being the first American named to the position, and the youngest of its first fifty appointees.

His early research focused on Plautus and Hellenistic Greek literature, work that culminated in his influential series of articles on the antecedents of Hellenistic comedy that overturned widely accepted views Prescott then turned toward Augustan poetry, especially Virgil, producing The Development of Virgil's Art, a book intended to deepen the appreciation of nonspecialist readers for Virgil's poetic technique. Later publications returned to Roman comedy, a field in which he produced a substantial body of work. Prescott also wrote on issues of general education, including the widely noted paper "General Education: Its Nature, Scope, and Essential Elements" (1934), in which he reflected on the purposes and methods of liberal education. By the time of his retirement in 1940 he had become one of the leading scholars in Hellenistic and Roman comedy.

Upon retiring from Chicago, Prescott was appointed visiting professor at the American Academy in Rome, but was prevented from assuming the post by the outbreak of World War II. Prescott instead spent the final two years of his life as the visiting Andrew Fleming West Professor at Princeton University.

== Personal life and death ==
Prescott and his wife had three sons, all of whom were serving in the armed forces during the Second World War at the time of his death. He died on June 13, 1943 .
