= Parkes Weber Prize =

Award for numismatics

The Parkes Weber Prize is a prize awarded annually by the Royal Numismatic Society in London, England, for original research relating to numismatics by a young scholar under the age of thirty.

== History ==
The prize is named after the British numismatist Frederick Parkes Weber. It was instituted in 1954, and in 1988 the award comprised a cash prize of £30 as well as a small bronze medal bearing a portrait of Weber by Frank Bowcher. At that time, the prize was limited to entrants under the age of 23 by the end of the calendar year.

By 1998, the cash prize had increased to £150, but entrants were restricted to those under 23 by the end of August.

== Description ==
The Parkes Weber Prize is under the administration of the Council of the Royal Numismatic Society. It is awarded for an original essay of not more than 5,000 words on any subject relating to coins, medals, medallions, tokens or paper money. Entrants of any nationality, under the age of 30 by the end of the calendar year, are eligible for the prize As of 2026 it is worth £150.

== Prizewinners ==
The prizewinners include:

- 1954 D.W. Dykes - "Some local tokens and their issuers in early nineteenth century Swansea"
  - Highly commended: I. H. Stewart - "Aspects of coinage and currency in medieval Scotland"
- 1955 D. M. Metcalf*
- 1956 I. Stewart
- 1959 D. Nugus and D.E. Hanson
- 1965 P. O’Shea
- 1966 C.M. Hake
- 1967 S. Leggett
- 1968 I.C. Thomson
- 1969 M.R. Curry
- 1970 H. Emary
- 1971 M.A. Guilding
- 1972 M.A.S. Blackburn and S. Cope
- 1974 G.C. Kumpikevicius
- 1975 Michael A. Flower and Andrew Wager
- 1976 K. Costello
- 1977 R. Macpherson
- 1978 M.B. Pearson
- 1979 R.B. Sampson
- 1982 M.J. Druck
- 1983 N. Summerton - Ancient British Coins
- 1991 M. Rockman
- 1992 Henry S. Kim
- 1993 E. Theran
- 1994 John Orna-Ornstein
- 1997 S. Armstrong, T.C. Crafter and P. Kiernan
- 2000 E.L. Cheung
- 2002 P. Kiernan
- 2003 S. Skaltsa
- 2004 N. Elkins
- 2005 Rory Naismith
- 2006 Di Hu
- 2008 Rebecca Day [Darley]
- 2011 Lauren Proctor
- 2012 Tom Waldwyn
- 2013 Matthew Naiman and Victoria Collins
- 2014 Murray Andrews and Supratik Baralay
- 2015 Michael Economou
- 2018a George Green - "The relationship between the Romans and their gold coinage A.D. 64−A.D. 200"
- 2018b Charlotte Mann - "The circulation of Festival coins struck for the Eleusinian Mysteries"
- 2021 Bridget McClean
- 2022 Annika Ester Maresia
- 2024 Bradley Hopper
- 2025 James Hua

*Metcalf went on to donate his prize to the Heberden Coin Room of the Ashmolean (HCR165991).
