= Froma Zeitlin =

American classics teacher (born 1933)

Froma I. Zeitlin
- Born: May 9, 1933 (age 93); New York City, New York, United States
- Children: Jonathan, Judith, and Ariel
- Awards: Howard T. Berhman Award for Distinguished Achievement in the Humanities; Guggenheim Fellowship, 1984

Academic background
- Education: Radcliffe College (BA); The Catholic University of America (MA); Columbia University
- Thesis: (1970)

Academic work
- Discipline: Classics
- Sub-discipline: Greek Literature
- Institutions: Rutgers University; Princeton University

Froma I. Zeitlin (born 9 May 1933) is an American Classics scholar. She specializes in ancient Greek literature, with particular interests in epic, drama and prose fiction, along with work in gender criticism, and the relationship between art and text in the context of the visual culture of antiquity. Zeitlin's work on establishing new approaches to Greek tragedy has been considered particularly influential.

== Career ==
Froma Zeitlin was born in New York, and grew up on the Upper West Side, where she was educated in a public girls' high school. In 1951, she began her studies at Radcliffe College (BA 1954) and at the Catholic University of America (MA 1965). After a nine-year break, she returned to graduate school, and was awarded her PhD by Columbia University in 1970. Her thesis was entitled The Ritual World of Greek Tragedy.

During the final year of writing her dissertation, she started her first job at Brooklyn College. From 1970 to 1976, she was an assistant professor at Rutgers University, and she became an associate professor in 1967. In 1965, during her time at Rutgers, she was awarded a grant from the National Endowment for the Humanities.

Zeitlin joined the faculty of Princeton University in 1976, where she taught Greek Literature, Greek Mythology and Gender studies. She joined Princeton at a time when there were other influential women in the department, notably Ann Bergren, Janet Marion Martin and Lois Hinckley, although Bergren and Hinckley left shortly afterwards. She became Professor of Classics in 1983, and of Comparative Literature in 1989. From 1992 Zeitlin served as Ewing Professor of Greek Language and Literature, succeeding David J. Furley. In 1996, Zeitlin founded the Judaic Studies program at Princeton, and directed it until 2005. In 1995/6 she was the Sather Professor of Classical Literature at the University of California, Berkeley. Among other honors, she has been Directeur d’Études Associé at both the Collège de France and the École Pratique des Hautes Études; she is an honorary fellow of Newnham College, and in 2001 was elected a member of the American Academy of Arts and Sciences.

== Influence ==
Froma Zeitlin was one of the first Classicists to apply methods from Structuralism, Semiotics, and Gender Studies to Ancient Literature. She describes her interest in Gender Studies as being related to its value as a tool, through which the events of Greek Tragedy could be understood. She has also been considered particularly influential for her role in creating links between European theorists (such as Jean-Pierre Vernant) and the field of Classics in America. She has written numerous essays and monographs dealing with overarching cultural themes, many of which have influenced the creation of significant new approaches or debates. Zeitlin has supervised PhD dissertations throughout her career, including the classicist Rosa Andújar.

== Personal life ==
Zeitlin is the mother of the economic historian Jonathan Zeitlin, the scholar of Chinese literature Judith Zeitlin and programming librarian Ariel Zeitlin. She is the mother-in-law of art historian Wu Hung. Her granddaughter is the media scholar Lida Zeitlin-Wu, and her nephew is the theoretical chemist David Tannor.

== Selected works ==
Single-authored books

- The Ritual World of Greek Tragedy. Ann Arbor 1973
- Under the Sign of the Shield: Semiotics and Aeschylus’ Seven against Thebes. Lanham 1982. 2nd Ed, Lanham 2009. ISBN 9780739125892
- Playing the Other. Gender and Society in Classical Greek Literature. Chicago 1996. ISBN 0-22697922-9

Co-edited volumes

- Nothing to do with Dionysos? Athenian Drama in Its Social Context. Princeton 1990. ISBN 0-691-06814-3
- Jean-Pierre Vernant: Mortals and Immortals. Collected Essays. Princeton 1991. ISBN 0-691-06831-3
- Before Sexuality: The Construction of Erotic Experience in the Ancient Greek World. Princeton 1991. ISBN 9780691002217
