= Brent Shaw =

Canadian historian (born 1947)

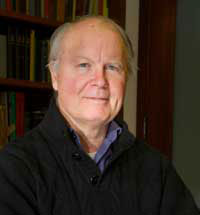
- Shaw in 2012
- Born: Brent Donald Shaw; May 27, 1947 (age 79); Edmonton, Alberta, Canada
- Occupation: Professor of Classics (Emeritus)
- Spouse: Shauna Shaw (m. 1969)

Academic background
- Education: BA in Classics and Anthropology (University of Alberta, 1968); MA in Classics and Ancient History (University of Alberta, 1971); PhD in Classics and Ancient History (Cambridge University, 1978)
- Doctoral advisor: Joyce Reynolds
- Website: classics.princeton.edu/people/brent-shaw

Brent Donald Shaw (born May 27, 1947) is a Canadian historian and Andrew Fleming West Professor (Emeritus) in Classics at Princeton University. His principal contributions center on the regional history of the Roman world with special emphasis on the African provinces of the Roman Empire, the demographic and social history of the Roman family, and problems of violence and social order.

== Education and career ==
Shaw received his B.A. and M.A. from the University of Alberta in 1968 and 1971 respectively. He later acquired his Ph.D. from Cambridge University in 1978, completing his dissertation research on pastoral nomadism and state regulation under the supervision of Joyce Reynolds.

After an initial post at the University of Birmingham, Shaw taught at the University of Lethbridge in western Canada from 1977–1996, spending a fellowship year at the Institute for Advanced Study in 1994, and two years as a visiting professor at Princeton University in 1989 and 1995. Shaw then took up a professorship at the University of Pennsylvania in 1996, which he held until taking up the Andrew Fleming West Chair in Classics at Princeton University in 2004. In 2012, Shaw was elected a resident member of the American Philosophical Society. Shaw entered emeritus status (retired) in 2017.

== Work ==
Shaw has written extensively on problems of violence in establishing conditions of peace and order throughout the Roman world, in particular on bandits and brigands, and on sectarian violence. In a series of articles published through the 1980s and 1990s, Shaw provided a novel interpretation of the phenomenon of banditry and of the relationship of autonomy and violence to sustaining state power and force, drawing on Josephus, and engaging critically with the work of British Marxist Eric Hobsbawm. Shaw later shifted his focus to understanding how early Christians produced sectarian or religious violence by the popularization of images of ideological enemies, and through the mobilization of sentiment using both the idea and the practice of martyrdom. His book on the subject, Sacred Violence, was awarded the Wallace K. Ferguson Prize of the Canadian Historical Association for best book in history for 2011, and the PROSE Award for best book in Classics and Ancient History of 2011.

Shaw has also made significant contributions to the understanding of the economic and political integration of North Africa into the Roman Empire, exploring the problem of urbanization, and the economic role of pastoral nomads, as part of this process of integration. More broadly, Shaw has used historical contexts to explore how economic actions relate to ways in which human populations develop modes of thinking. In Bringing in the Sheaves, Shaw explores the relationship between the reaping of cereal crops in the Roman Empire and the ways in which people began thinking about death and vengeance in their social relations.

Shaw has also brought his historical knowledge to a wider audience through publications in History Today, The New Republic, the New Left Review, and The New York Review of Books.

=== The Neronian persecution ===
Shaw created controversy in 2015, when an article he published on the Journal of Roman Studies argued that Emperor Nero had not, as it is generally believed, persecuted Christians following the Great Fire of Rome. While Shaw accepted the authenticity of the passage of Tacitus about Christians in the Annals, he argued that Tacitus was using legendary and apocalyptic Christian sources to write his work; he also argued that the term "Christians" was not in use during Nero's reign and that Christians in Rome weren't so numerous to be persecuted.

Shaw's views have received strong criticism and have generally not been accepted by the scholarly consensus: writing on New Testament Studies, Christopher P. Jones (Harvard University) answered to Shaw and challenged his arguments, noting that Tacitus's anti-Christian stance makes it unlikely that he was using Christian sources; he also noted that the Epistle to the Romans of Paul the Apostle clearly points to the fact that there was indeed a clear and distinct Christian community in Rome in the 50s and that the persecution is also mentioned by Suetonius in The Twelve Caesars. Shaw responded to Jones in an article in the same journal. Larry Hurtado (University of Edinburgh) was also critical of Shaw's argument, dismissing it as "vague and hazy".

Writing on Eirene: Studia Graeca et Latina, Brigit van der Lans and Jan N. Bremmer (University of Groningen) also dismissed Shaw's argument, noting that the Neronian persecution is recorded in many 1st-century Christian writings, such as the Epistle to the Hebrews, the Book of Revelation, the apocryphal Ascension of Isaiah, the First Epistle of Peter, the Gospel of John and the First Epistle of Clement, although these texts, while referring to fires or punishments, do not explicitly relate these events to the Neronian fire. Van der Lans and Bremmer also argued that Chrestianus, Christianus, and Χριστιανός were probably terms invented by the Romans in the 50s and then adopted by Christians themselves.

In an article for Vigiliae Christianae, John Granger Cook (LaGrange College) also rebuked Shaw's thesis, arguing that Chrestianus, Christianus, and Χριστιανός are not creations of the second century and that Roman officials were probably aware of the Chrestiani in the 60s.

In his book Ten Caesars: Roman Emperors from Augustus to Costantine, Barry S. Strauss (Cornell University) rejects Shaw's argument.

== Selected publications ==
=== Books ===
- Spartacus and the Slave Wars: A Brief History with Documents (2001). Bedford/St. Martin's. ISBN 0-312-23703-0
- Sacred Violence: African Christians and Sectarian Hatred in the Age of Augustine (2011). Cambridge University Press. ISBN 0-521-12725-4
- Bringing in the Sheaves: Economy and Metaphor in the Roman World (2013). University of Toronto Press. ISBN 1-442-64479-6

=== Edited and co-authored ===
- Finley, Moses I. (1983). Economy and Society in Ancient Greece (Saller, Richard P. and Shaw, Brent D. eds.). Penguin (Pelican). ISBN 0-140-22520-X
- Finley, Moses I. (1998). Ancient Slavery and Modern Ideology (Shaw, Brent D., ed. Reprinting of 1980 edition). Markus Wiener Publishers. ISBN 1-558-76171-3
- Shaw, Brent D., et. al. (2008). Worlds Together, Worlds Apart 2nd edition. W. W. Norton. ISBN 0-393-93493-4

=== Collected papers ===
- Environment and Society in Roman North Africa (1995). Variorum. ISBN 0-860-78479-7
- Rulers, Nomads, and Christians in Roman North Africa (1995). Variorum. ISBN 0-860-78490-8

=== Articles ===
- "Eaters of Flesh, Drinkers of Milk: the Ancient Mediterranean Ideology of the Pastoral Nomad". Ancient Society. 13: 5–31. December 1982.
- "Bandits in the Roman Empire". Past & Present (105): 326–374. 1984.

Revised with addendum on recent research in: Shaw, Brent (2003), "Bandits in the Roman Empire", in Osborne, R. (ed.), Studies in Ancient Greek and Roman Society, Cambridge University Press, pp. 326–374.

- Shaw, Brent D. (1987). "The Family in Late Antiquity: The Experience of Augustine". Past & Present (115): 3–51. doi:10.1093/past/115.1.3. ISSN 0031-2746. JSTOR 650838.
- Shaw, Brent D. (1987). "The Age of Roman Girls at Marriage: Some Reconsiderations". Journal of Roman Studies. 77: 30–46. doi:10.2307/300573. JSTOR 300573.
- Shaw, Brent D. (1993). "The Passion of Perpetua". Past and Present (139): 3–45. doi:10.1093/past/139.1.3.

Revised with addendum on recent research in: Shaw, Brent (2003), "The Passion of Perpetua", in Osborne, R. (ed.), Studies in Ancient Greek and Roman Society, Cambridge University Press, pp. 286–325.

- Shaw, Brent D. (1996). "Seasons of Death: Aspects of Mortality in Imperial Rome". The Journal of Roman Studies. 86: 100–138. doi:10.1017/s0075435800057452.
- Shaw, Brent (2003), "Climate, Environment, and History: the Case of Roman North Africa", in Wigley, T.M.L.; Ingram, M.; Farmer, G. (eds.), Climate and History: Studies in Past Climates and their Impact on Man, Cambridge University Press, pp. 379–403.
- Shaw, Brent D. (2015). "The Myth of the Neronian Persecution". Journal of Roman Studies. 105: 73–100. doi:10.1017/S0075435815000982. S2CID 162564651.
