= Ezra P. Prentice =

American politician

Ezra Parmelee Prentice (August 19, 1877 – July 19, 1966) was an American lawyer and politician from New York.

== Life ==
Prentice was born on August 19, 1877, in Albany, New York, the son of William Packer Prentice and Florence Kelly. His father was Chief of Staff for General O. M. Mitchell during the American Civil War and counsel for the New York City Health Department from 1873 to 1892. His paternal grandfather, Ezra P. Prentice, was president of the National Commercial Bank in Albany and the Albany and Susquehanna Railroad. His maternal grandfather, Robert Kelly, was City Chamberlain of New York in 1856. His brother was William Kelly Prentice, a classics professor at Princeton University.

Prentice attended Halsey Collegiate School in New York City. He then went to Princeton University, graduating from there with a B.A. in 1898. He also received an M.A. there in 1903. In 1899, he enlisted in Squadron A of the New York National Guard. He later re-enlisted and served in the National Guard until 1910. He graduated from the New York Law School with an LL.B. in 1900 and was admitted to the bar later that year. He initially worked in the law office of his father and brother, W. P. & R. K. Prentice. During 1901, he became a law clerk in the office of Parsons, Shepard & Ogden. During 1903, he opened a law office at 52 Broadway.

In 1903, Prentice was elected to the New York State Assembly as a Republican, representing the New York County 25th District. He served in the Assembly in 1904, 1905, 1906, and 1907. While in the Assembly, he was a member of the Armstrong Committee. He was a delegate to the 1908 and 1912 Republican National Conventions. He was Deputy Attorney General of New York from 1909 to 1910, was a member of the New York Republican State Committee, and in October 1910 he was elected Chairman of the Committee after Theodore Roosevelt ousted the Party's Old Guard. He resigned as chairman after Henry L. Stimson lost the governor's election to John Alden Dix.

In 1910, Prentice became a member of the law company Hall, Hawkes & Prentice. In 1913, the company was dissolved after the senior partner died, and he formed the company McClure & Prentice. In 1915, he became a member of the law company Clark, Prentice & Roulstone. The company was later dissolved, and by 1923 he was with the law company Prentice, Collins & Dwight at 55 Liberty Street. During World War I, he served on the War Committee of the Bar of the City of New York, which provided assistance for the government and gave free legal service for people serving with the military as well as their family and dependents, and was Assistant to the Legal Committee of the Home Service Section of the American Red Cross and aided with issues related to the War Risk Insurance Act. He was a director of the Spicer Manufacturing Corporation, the Salisbury Axle Company, the Hartford Auto Parts Corporation, the Corralitos Company, the Cuba Development Company, the Lanman Company, and the Rogers Peet Company.

Prentice attended the First Presbyterian Church of New York. He was president of the New York Young Republican Club and a member of the University Cottage Club, Phi Beta Kappa, the Sons of the American Revolution, the New York City Bar Association, the New York State Bar Association, the New York County Lawyers' Association, the New York Law Institute, the Academy of Political Science, the American Bar Association, the National Security League, the Civil Service Reform Association, and the Legal Aid Society. In 1914, he married Mary Prentice Russell; they had a son, Ezra Parmalee Jr.

Prentice died in Beacon, New York on July 19, 1966. He was buried in the Albany Rural Cemetery.

New York State Assembly
Preceded by Howard Conkling	New York State Assembly; New York County, 25th District; 1904–1907	Succeeded by Artemas Ward Jr.
Party political offices
Preceded by Timothy L. Woodruff	Chairman of the New York Republican State Committee; 1910–1911	Succeeded by William Barnes Jr.
