= Giger Professor of Latin =

Chair at Princeton University

The Giger Professorship of Latin is an endowed chair for the teaching of Latin at Princeton University.

Established by the gift of George Musgrave Giger, who served as Professor of Greek and Latin at Princeton from 1847–1865, the chair has been held by a senior Latinist at Princeton intermittently since 1883, when University president James McCosh invited Andrew Fleming West to fill the newly founded position.

== List of Giger Professors ==
- Andrew Fleming West (1883–1928)
- George E. Duckworth (1940–1971)
- J. Arthur Hanson (1981–1985)
- R. Elaine Fantham (1988–1999)
- Denis Feeney (2000–2022)
- Andrew Feldherr (2022–)

== See also ==
- Andrew Fleming West Chair, Princeton University
- Ewing Professor of Greek, Princeton University
- Corpus Christi Professor of Latin, University of Oxford
- Kennedy Professor of Latin, University of Cambridge
- Professor of Latin, University College London
- Sather Professorship of Classical Literature, University of California, Berkeley
