= Andrew Feldherr =

Andrew Feldherr is professor of classics at Princeton University from where he also earned his bachelor's degree. He received his PhD from the University of California at Berkeley. He was appointed Giger Professor of Latin in 2022.

== Selected publications ==
- Spectacle and Society in Livy's History. University of California Press, 1998.
- The Cambridge Companion to the Roman Historians. (Cambridge Companions to Literature) Cambridge University Press, 2009.
- Playing Gods: Ovid's Metamorphoses and the Politics of Fiction. Princeton University Press, 2010.
- The Oxford History of Historical Writing: Volume 1: Beginnings to AD 600. Oxford University Press, 2011. (Editor with Grant Hardy)
