= Edmund Yard Robbins =

American philologist (1867–1942)

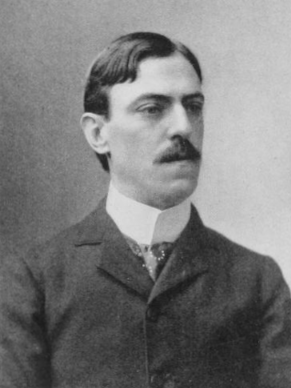
- Born: October 3, 1867; Windsor, New Jersey, US
- Died: May 30, 1942 (aged 74); Princeton, New Jersey, US
- Education: Princeton University
- Occupation: Philologist
- Employer: Princeton University

Edmund Yard Robbins (October 3, 1867 – May 30, 1942) was an American philologist. He was Ewing Professor of the Greek Language and Literature at Princeton University.

== Biography ==
Edmund Yard Robbins was born on October 3, 1867, in the Windsor section of Robbinsville Township, New Jersey.

In 1889, he obtained a bachelor's, and in 1890 a master's degree from Princeton. From 1891 to 1894, he furthered his studies at the University of Leipzig. On his return he was as an instructor at Princeton University in Greek. In 1897, he was appointed assistant professor. After his graduation to Doctor of Letters with unpublished work of the Greek orator Isaeus (1901), he was appointed full professor in 1902. In 1910, he succeeded S. Stanhope Orris in the Ewing Professorship of Greek Language and Literature. From 1921 to 1922, he was professor at the Annual American School of Classical Studies at Athens. In 1936 he became professor emeritus.

He was a member of the American Philological Association in 1899.

He died at his home in Princeton on May 30, 1942. In his honor in 1949, the Edmund Y. Robbins Fellowships were established in Classics.
