= Heinrich von Staden (historian) =

German-born American classical philologist and historian of science and medicine

Heinrich von Staden (born 1939) is a South African historian and classical scholar who has written several books and hundreds of articles and encyclopedia entries on ancient medicine, ancient philosophy, the history of science, and comparative literature. He is one of the world's foremost authorities on ancient science and medicine and has contributed to the transformation of the history of the subject in the period from the fifth century B.C. to the fifth century A.D. His monumental book Herophilus: The Art of Medicine in Early Alexandria is considered the standard in the field.

== Education and career ==
Von Staden is a 1961 graduate of Yale College and received his Ph.D. from the University of Tübingen in 1968. He was a Professor of Classics and Comparative Literature at Yale University from 1968 to 1998 and a Professor of Classical Literature at the University of California, Berkeley in 2009–10. He has also held visiting professorships at the University of Calabria in Italy, the California Institute of Technology, and the University of Texas at Austin. He is a Corresponding Fellow of the British Academy, a member of the Académie des Inscriptions et Belles-Lettres in France, a Foreign Member of the Finnish Academy of Science and Letters, a Göttingen Academy Corresponding Fellow, and a Member of the American Philosophical Society. He is a Fellow of the British Academy and a former president of the Society for Ancient Medicine

Since 1998 von Staden has been a Professor in the School of Historical Studies at the Institute for Advanced Study in Princeton, New Jersey.

== Works ==
- Herophilus: The Art of Medicine in Early Alexandria (1989). Cambridge University Press, ISBN 0521236460
- Western Literature, Volume 1: The Ancient World (1971). New York, Harcourt Brace Jovanovich, ISBN 0155952765
