= Alexander Phoebus Dionysiou Mourelatos =

American philosopher

Alexander Phoebus Dionysiou Mourelatos (born 1936) is an American philosopher. He is a recipient of a Guggenheim Fellowship.

== Works ==
- The Route of Parmenides. Yale UP, 1974.
- (Ed.) The Pre-Socratics: A Collection of Critical Essays. Doubleday 1974, ND Princeton University Press 1993.
