= Little York, Hunterdon County, New Jersey =

Populated place in Hunterdon County, New Jersey, US

Little York, New Jersey
- Unincorporated community
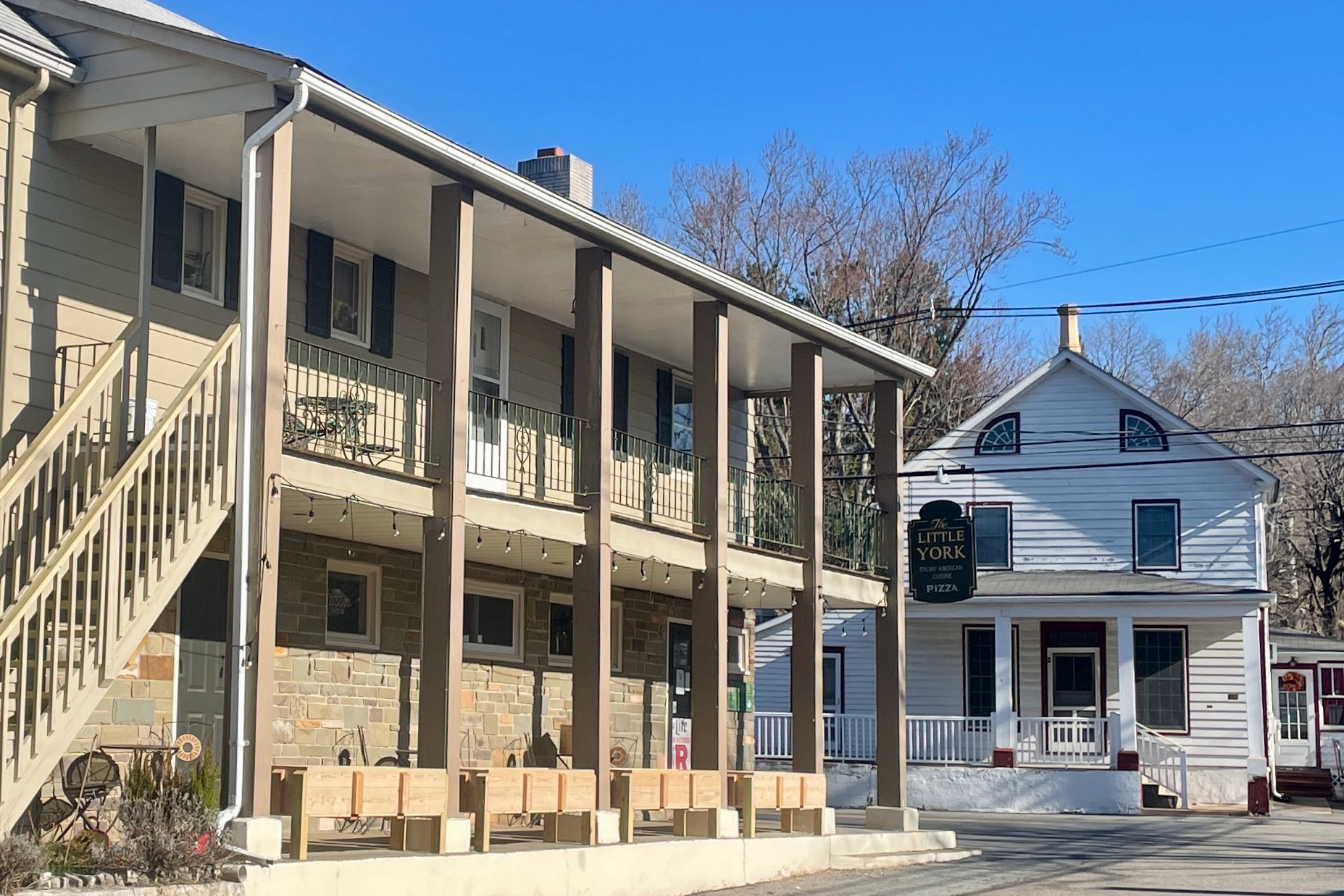
- Little York Tavern and Upper General Store

- Location within Hunterdon County, New Jersey Location within New Jersey Location within the United States
- Coordinates: 40°36′40″N 75°04′34″W
- Country: United States
- State: New Jersey
- County: Hunterdon
- Township: Alexandria and Holland
- Elevation: 358 ft (109 m)
- Time zone: UTC−05:00 (Eastern (EST))
  - Summer (DST): UTC−04:00 (EDT)
- ZIP Code: 08834
- Area code: 908
- GNIS feature ID: 877870

Little York is an unincorporated community located along the border of Alexandria and Holland townships in Hunterdon County, in the U.S. state of New Jersey. Little York is located on County Route 614 (Spring Mills Road, Little York Road) 3.1 miles (5.0 km) north-northeast of Milford. Little York has a post office with ZIP Code 08834.

== History ==
The Upper General Store was built c. 1810–30 and shows Federal architecture influences. The Little York Tavern, also historically known as the Franklin House, was built 1838–41, but is now of modern construction.

== Historic district ==
- Little York Historic District
- U.S. National Register of Historic Places
- U.S. Historic district
- New Jersey Register of Historic Places
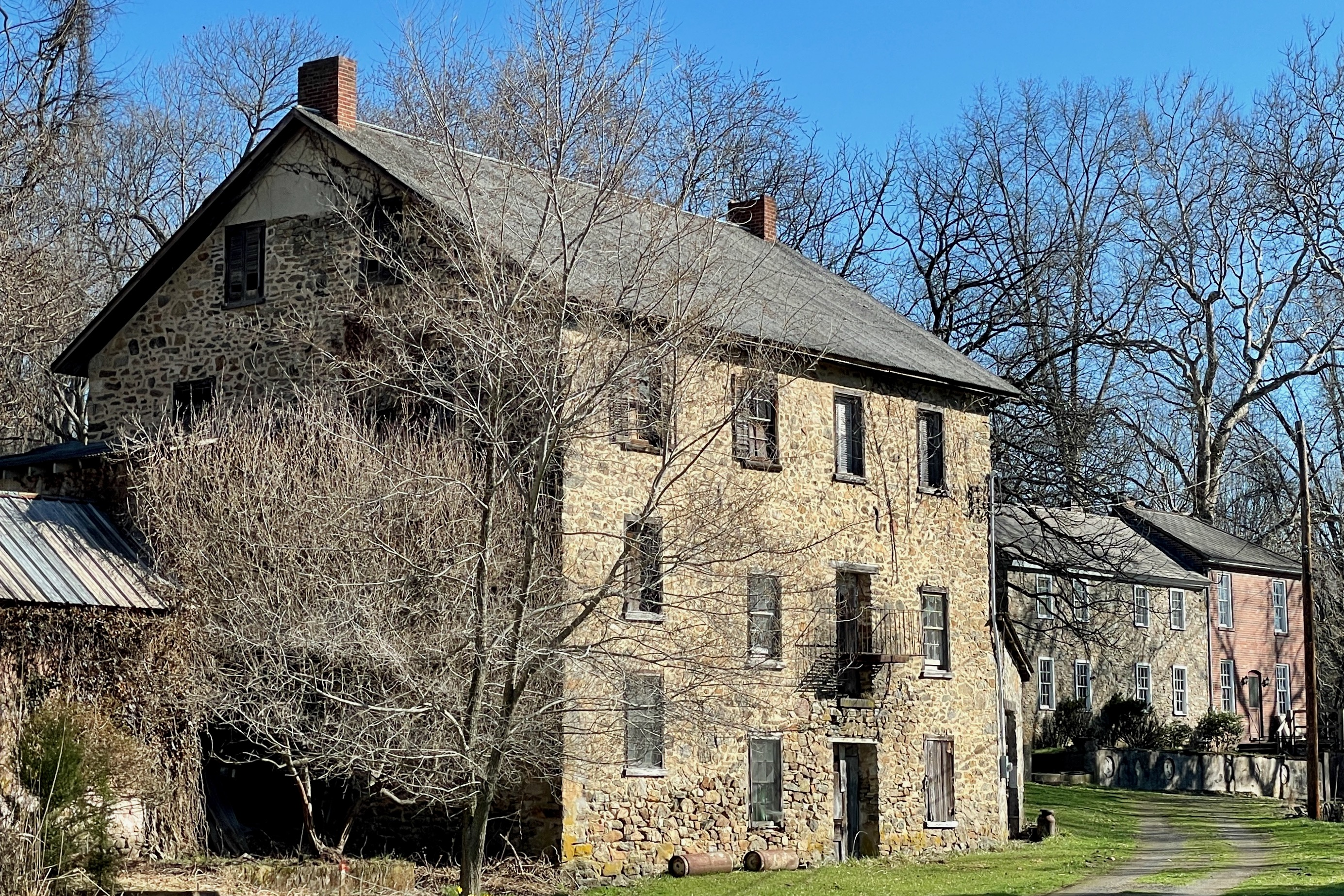
- Creamery/Cheese Factory at the Upper Mill
- Location: County Route 614 and Sweet Hollow Road
- Area: 51 acres (21 ha)
- Architectural style: Mid 19th Century Revival, Late 19th And 20th Century Revivals, Late Victorian
- NRHP reference No.: 88001207
- NJRHP No.: 1559

Significant dates
- Added to NRHP: August 4, 1988
- Designated NJRHP: June 17, 1988

The Little York Historic District is a 51-acre (21 ha) historic district encompassing the community along County Route 614 and Sweet Hollow Road. It was added to the National Register of Historic Places on August 4, 1988 for its significance in architecture, exploration/settlement, and industry. The district includes 69 contributing buildings, 11 contributing structures, and 6 contributing sites.

Several mills were built along the Hakihokake Creek flowing through the community. At the Upper Mill site, an oil mill was built c. 1815–35 by John Van Syckle (1789–1839) and a grist mill c. 1855. At the Lower Mill site, a grist mill was built c. 1815–25.

The Alexandria Presbyterian Church Chapel was built in 1844 using the frame of the 1795 Presbyterian Church in Mount Pleasant. It features vernacular Greek Revival style. The house with Italianate/Gothic Revival influences at 531 Spring Mills Road was built c. 1810–30 and remodeled c. 1870s. The house with Greek Revival and Victorian embellishment at 1 Little York-Pattenburg Road was built c. 1835–55.

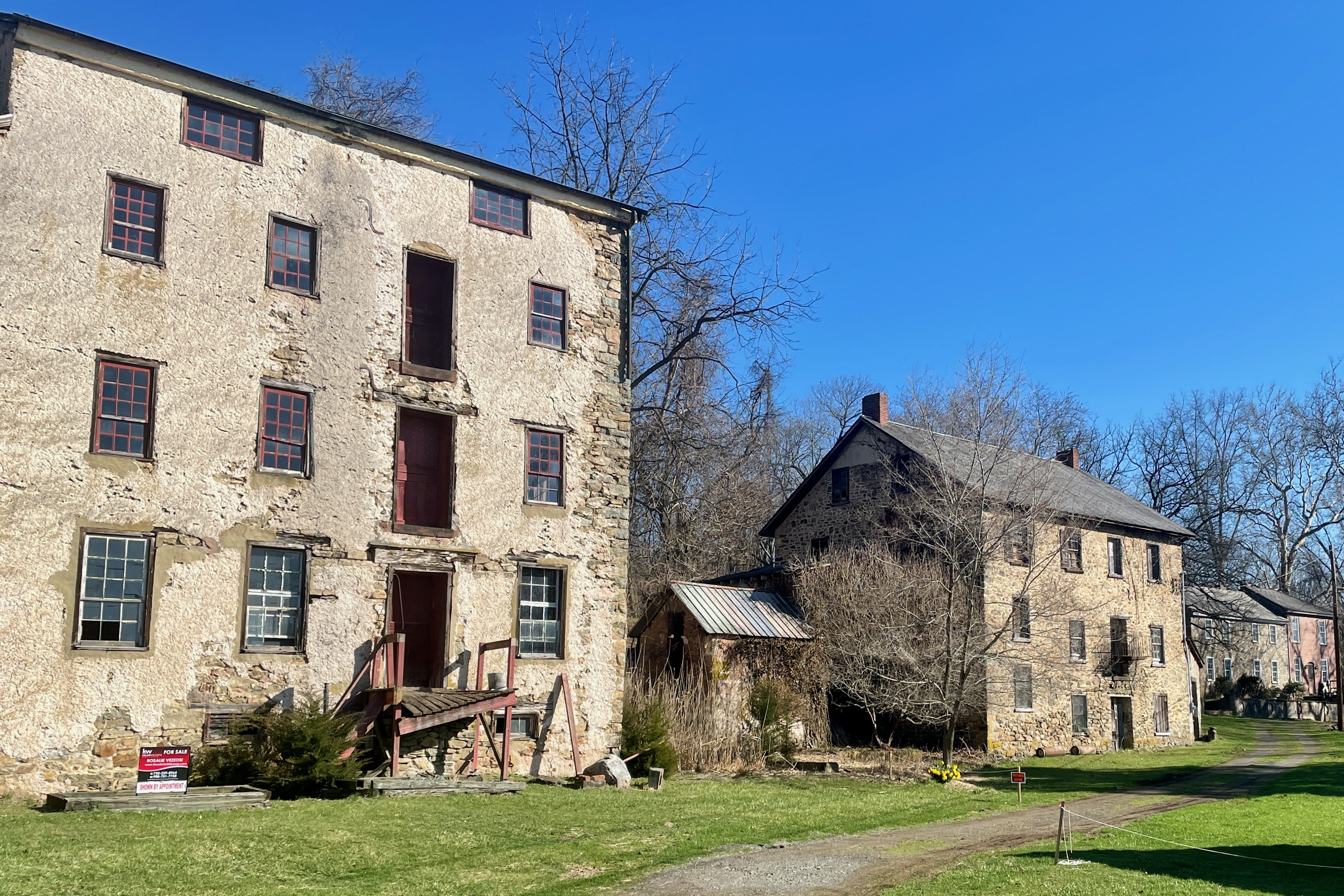
Upper Mill

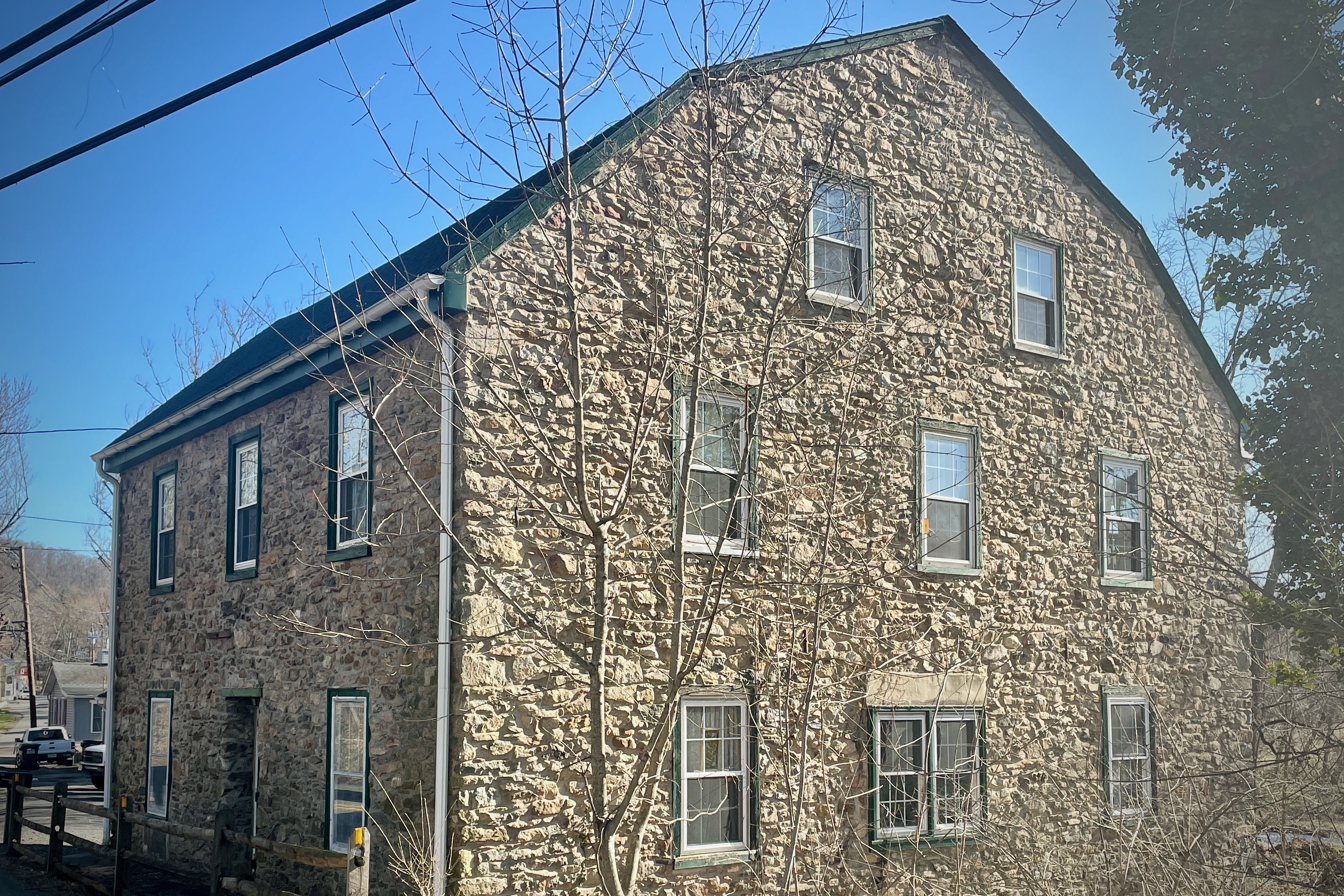
Lower Mill

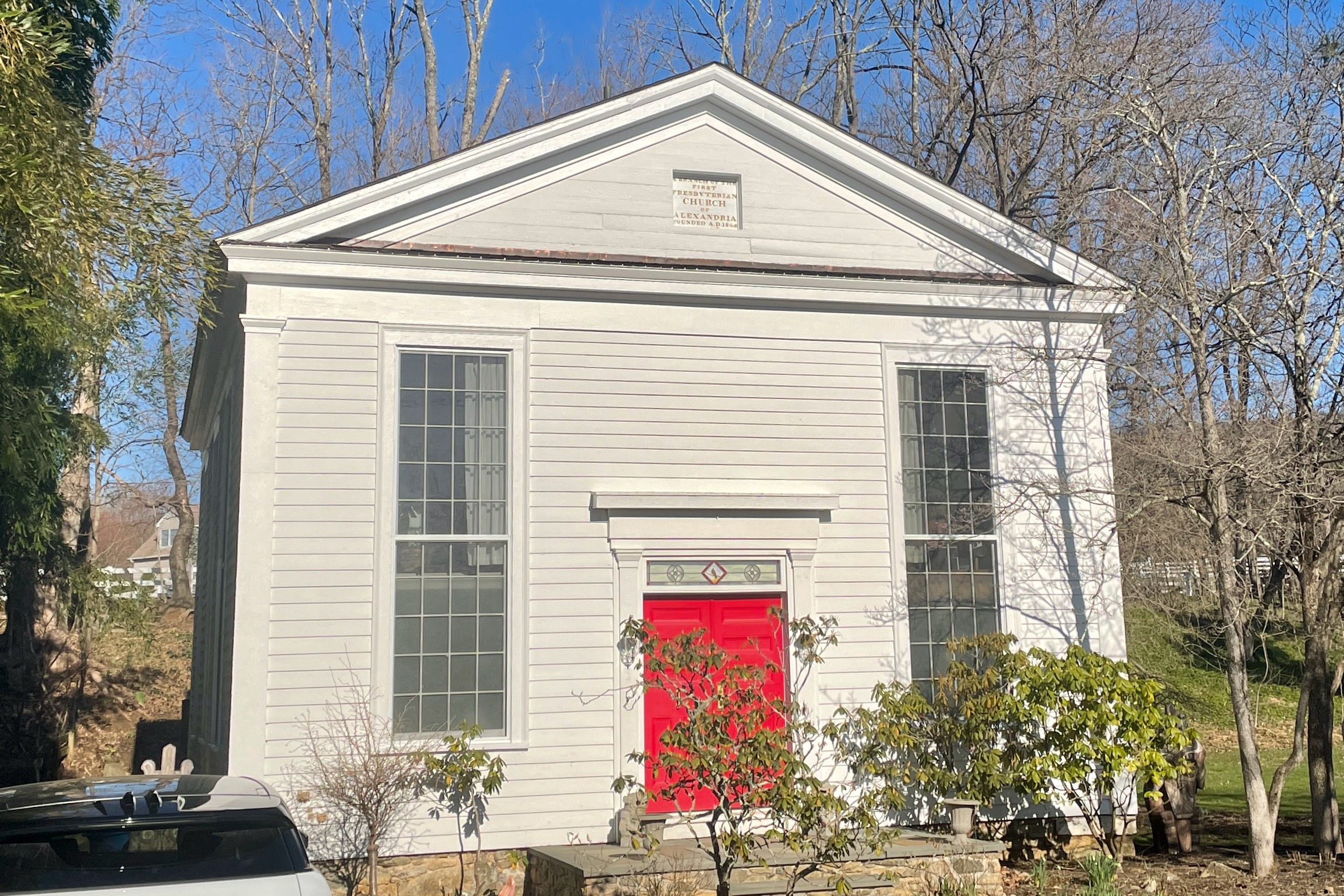
Alexandria Presbyterian Church Chapel

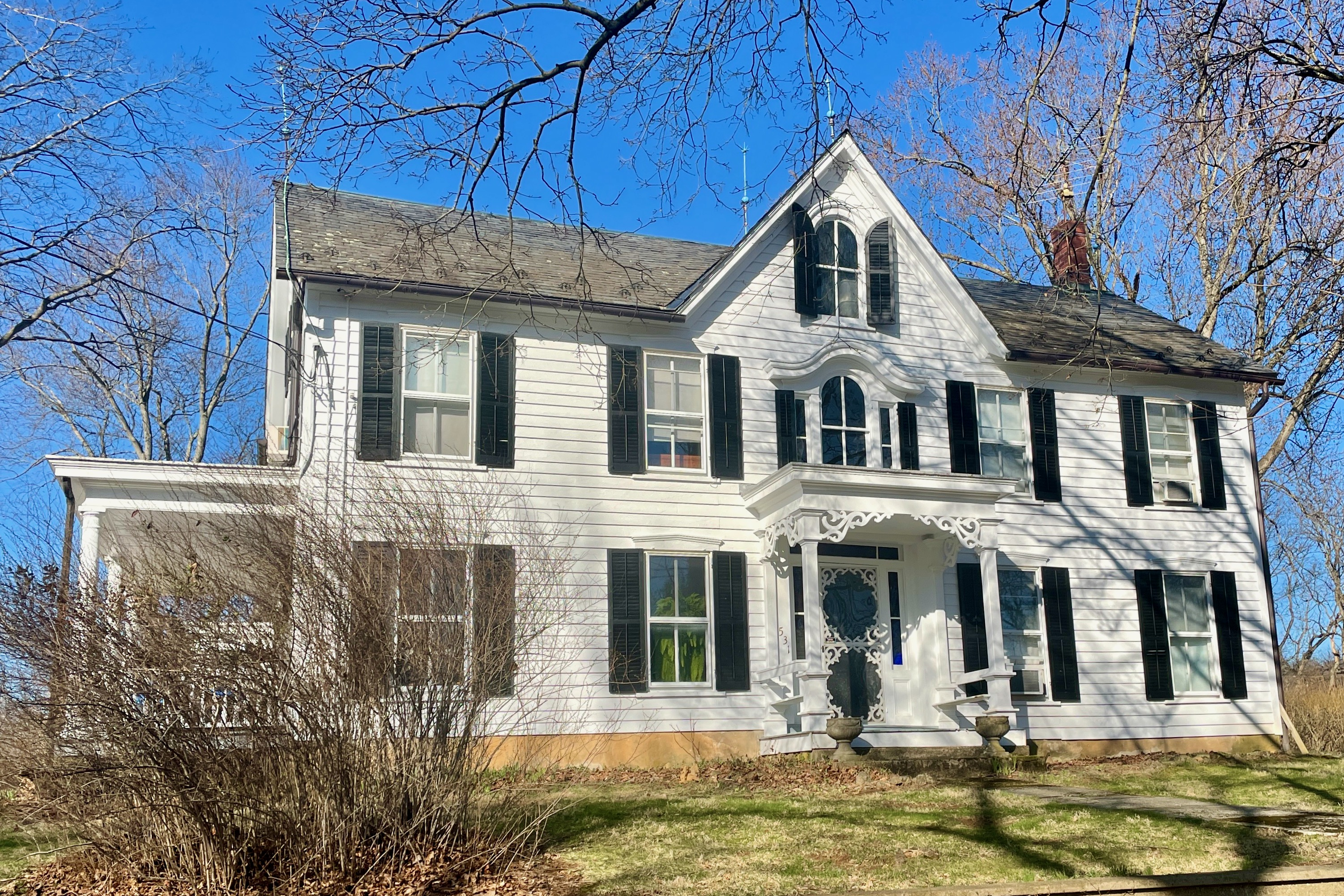
531 Spring Mills Road

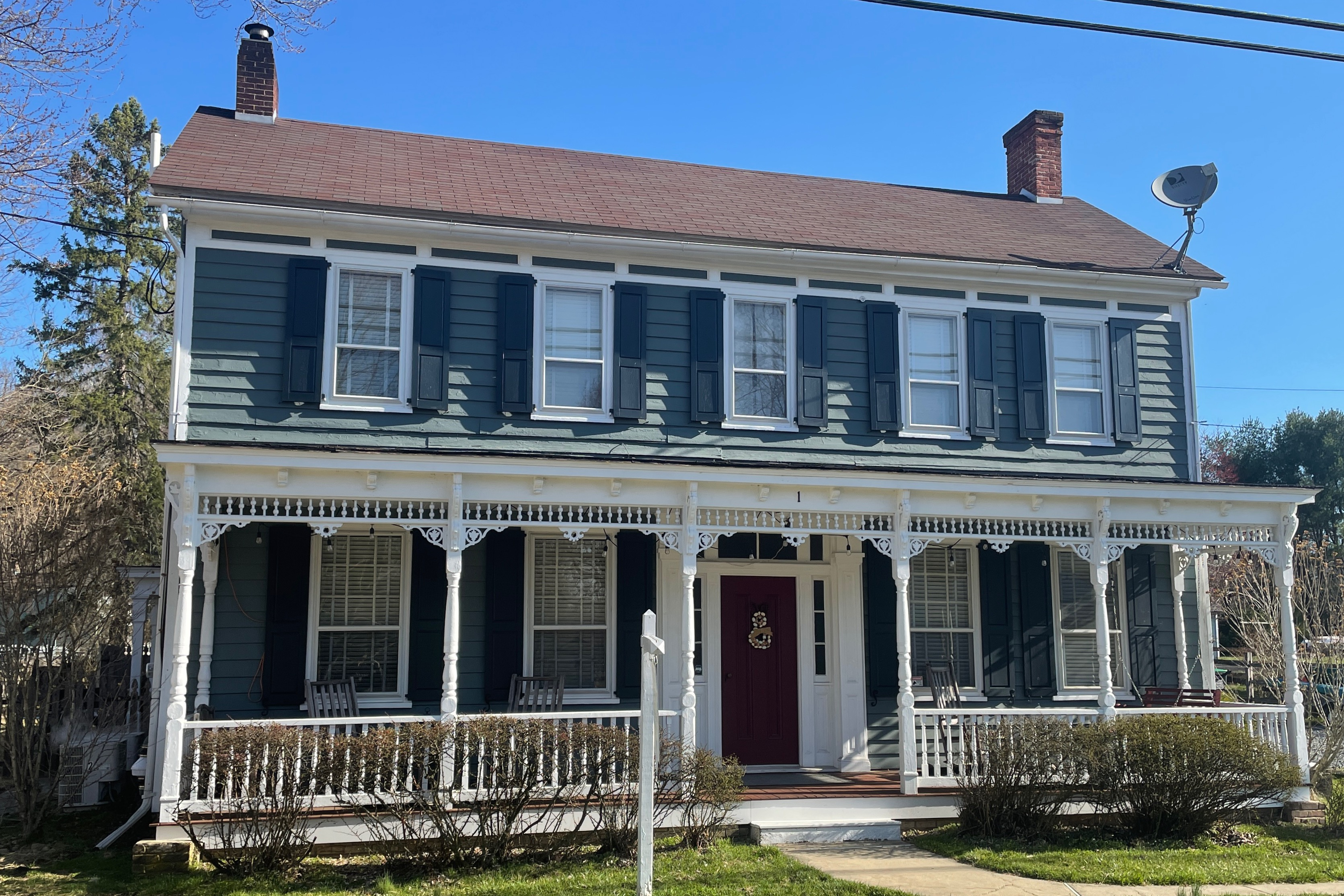
1 Little York-Pattenburg Road

== Transportation ==
County Route 614 (Spring Mills Road, Little York Road) runs east-west through the community and intersects with County Route 631 (Little York-Mount Pleasant Road), which runs north-south.

== See also ==
- National Register of Historic Places listings in Hunterdon County, New Jersey
