= Gerasimos Xenophon Santas =

Greek-American philosopher (1931–2021)

Gerasimos Santas
- Born: March 23, 1931
- Died: June 20, 2021 (aged 90)

Philosophical work
- Era: 21st-century philosophy
- Region: Western philosophy
- School: Ancient philosophy
- Institutions: University of California, Irvine
- Main interests: Ancient Greek philosophy

Gerasimos Xenophon Santas (March 23, 1931 - June 20, 2021) was a Greek-American philosopher and Professor of Philosophy at the University of California, Irvine. A festschrift in his honor was published in 2011.
