= S. Stanhope Orris =

American classicist (1838–1905)

Samuel Stanhope Orris
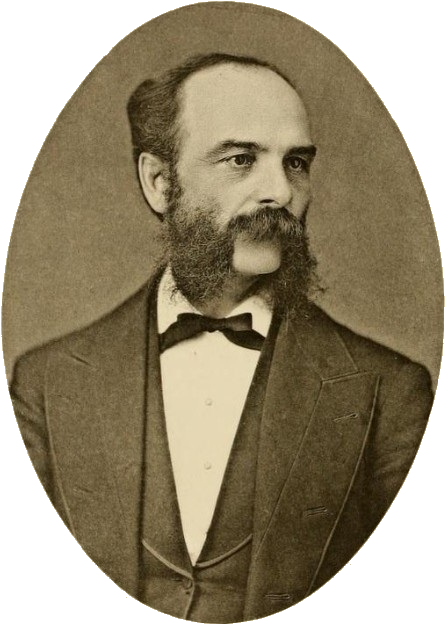
- Born: February 19, 1838; Ickesburg, Pennsylvania, US
- Died: December 17, 1905 (aged 67); Harrisburg, Pennsylvania, US
- Occupation: Classical Philologist

Academic background
- Education: Princeton University

Academic work
- Institutions: Princeton University

Signature
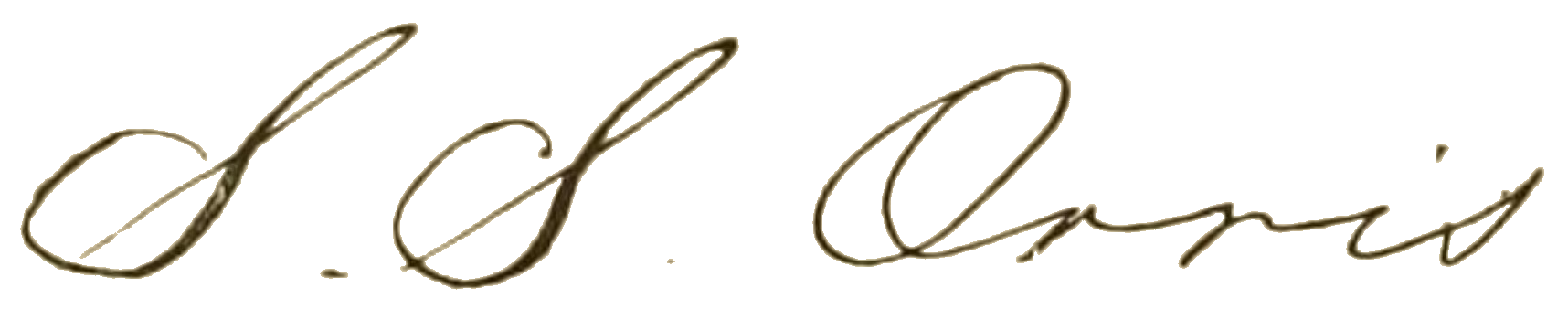

Samuel Stanhope Orris (February 19, 1838 – December 17, 1905), usually abbreviated S. Stanhope Orris, was an American classical philologist associated with Princeton University.

== Life ==
Samuel Stanhope Orris was born in Ickesburg, Pennsylvania on February 19, 1838. He graduated from the College of New Jersey in 1862 and from Princeton Theological Seminary in 1865. Ordained as a minister in 1866, Orris led the Spruce Creek Presbyterian Church in Pennsylvania for three years, studied for a year in Germany, then returned to the United States for another three years as stated supply pastor of the Collegiate Reformed Protestant Dutch Church in New York, during which time he was elected Professor of Greek at Marietta College in 1873 in Ohio.

In 1877, Orris returned to the College of New Jersey (by then generally known as Princeton University) as the inaugural Ewing Professor of Greek Language and Literature. He received doctorates in philosophy from Princeton in 1875 and in humane letters from Lafayette College in 1889. From 1888 to 1889, he served as the Director of the American School of Classical Studies in Athens. Orris was best known as a scholar for his work on Plato and Aristotle, and for his 1884 translation of the Didache.

After retiring from Princeton in 1902, Orris embarked on a world tour. While in China, he suffered a stroke from which he never recovered. He died in Harrisburg, Pennsylvania on December 17, 1905. His funeral eulogy was delivered by George Lansing Raymond. At the time of his death, he was considered one of the foremost American scholars.
