= Andrew Fleming West Chair =

Chair at Princeton University

The Andrew Fleming West Chair in Classics is an endowed chair for the teaching of classics at Princeton University.

Established by a gift of the Carnegie Corporation of New York in honor of Andrew Fleming West, long-serving Giger Professor of Latin and inaugural Dean of the Princeton University Graduate School, the chair originally functioned as a distinguished visiting professorship, beginning with Sir Denys Page in 1938. Its most recent holder was Roman historian Harriet I. Flower.

== List of Andrew Fleming West Professors ==
- Denys Page (1938–1939)
- Ivan Mortimer Linforth (1939–1940)
- John V.A. Fine (1940–1941)
- Henry W. Prescott (1941–1943)
- Allan C. Johnson (1943–1949)
- Whitney J. Oates (1949–1962)
- Samuel D. Atkins (1962–1978)
- W. Robert Connor (1978–1989)
- André Laks (1993–1995)
- Fritz Graf (2000–2002)
- Brent Shaw (2003–2017)
- Harriet I. Flower (2017–2026)

== See also ==
- Corpus Christi Professor of Latin, University of Oxford
- Giger Professor of Latin, Princeton University
- Ewing Professor of Greek, Princeton University
- Kennedy Professor of Latin, University of Cambridge
- Professor of Latin, University College London
- Sather Professorship of Classical Literature, University of California, Berkeley
