= Whitney J. Oates =

American classicist (1903–1973)

- Born: December 2, 1903; Chicago, Illinois, U.S.
- Died: October 15, 1973 (aged 69); Sarasota, Florida, U.S.
- Spouse: Virginia Hill (m. 1927)

Academic background
- Education: Princeton University (A.B., A.M., Ph.D.)
- Thesis: The Influence of Simonides of Ceos upon Horace

Academic work
- Institutions: Princeton University

Whitney Jennings "Mike" Oates (December 2, 1903 – October 15, 1973) was an American classical scholar, editor, and educator. A long-serving member and chair of the Princeton University Department of Classics, he was also a trustee of the Woodrow Wilson National Fellowship Foundation.

== Biography ==
Oates was born in Chicago, Illinois, on December 2, 1903. He entered Princeton University, where he received his A.B. in 1926 and his A.M. in 1927, the same year he began teaching in the Department of Classics and married his wife, Virginia Hill, with whom he had one daughter.

He completed his Ph.D. in 1931 with a dissertation on Greek literature and quickly established himself as a specialist in Greek drama, Hellenistic philosophy, and early Christian writers.

Oates taught at Princeton for more than thirty years, serving as chair of the Classics Department and playing a major role in shaping the university's humanities curriculum. His administrative influence extended beyond Princeton: he helped design a system, implemented within the Princeton University Graduate School and later widely emulated, to provide pre-doctoral fellows with early graduate-level research experience. Deeply influenced by the neo-Humanism of senior Princeton colleague Paul Elmer More, he was an active and engaged teacher, perennially voted "favorite lecturer and preceptor" in senior class polls.

During World War II, Oates served with the United States Marine Corps in Air Intelligence Operations, leaving the service with the rank of major.

In his later career, Oates became a trustee of the Woodrow Wilson National Fellowship Foundation. The Foundation's fellowship system—designed partly from Oates's proposals—enabled promising students to gain exposure to graduate-level academic life. By the early 1970s, more than 10,000 scholars had benefited from these programs and gone on to academic careers across the United States.

Oates died at his home in Sarasota, Florida, on October 15, 1973, at the age of 70. The Whitney J. Oates Visiting Fellowships at Princeton University are named in his honor.

== Scholarship ==
Oates's scholarship was wide-ranging, with particular strengths in Greek tragedy, Hellenistic philosophy, and the Latin Church Fathers. He edited and co-edited several influential anthologies that became standard texts in classical and humanities education.

His collaborative work with Eugene O'Neill Jr., The Complete Greek Drama (1938), offered accessible, annotated translations of the major surviving Greek plays. He later edited The Stoic and Epicurean Philosophers (1940), a popular collection that introduced major Hellenistic philosophical texts to a broad audience. His Basic Writings of Saint Augustine (1948) helped expand the role of Christian texts in Great Books curricula.

Oates also contributed to classical studies through numerous articles, editorial projects, and leadership roles within Princeton's humanities programs, notably founding Princeton's Program in Classical Philosophy with Gregory Vlastos.

== Positions and Honors ==
=== Academic Positions ===
- Chair, Department of Classics, Princeton University (1945–1961)
- Chairman, Special Program in the Humanities, Princeton University (1945–1960)
- Ewing Professor of Greek, Princeton University (1946–1949)
- Andrew Fleming West Professor of Classics, Princeton University (1949–1962)
- Chair, Council of the Humanities, Princeton University (1953–1970)
- Director and Treasurer, American Council of Learned Societies (1956–1970)
- Avalon University Professor in the Humanities, Princeton University (1962–1970)
- Founding Member, National Commission on the Humanities (1963–1965)
- Senator, Phi Beta Kappa, and President, United Chapters of Phi Beta Kappa (1964–1970)

=== Honorary Doctorates ===
- Humane Letters (LHD), Rockford College, 1961
- Humane Letters (LHD), Brown University, 1961
- Letters (D.Litt.), Middlebury College, 1964
- Humane Letters (LHD), Washington and Lee University, 1967

== Selected Publications ==
- “The Population of Rome,” Classical Philology 29 (1934): 101–116.
- The Complete Greek Drama, 2 vols., edited with Eugene O'Neill Jr. (New York, 1938).
- The Stoic and Epicurean Philosophers (New York, 1940; 1957).
- “The Ideal States of Plato and Aristotle,” in The Greek Political Experience (Princeton, 1941), 187–212.
- Greek Literature in Translation, edited with C. T. Murphy (New York, 1944).
- Greek and Roman Classics in Translation, edited with C. T. Murphy and K. Guinagh (New York & London, 1946).
- Basic Writings of St. Augustine, 2 vols. (New York, 1948; repr. Grand Rapids, MI, 1980).
- From Sophocles to Picasso: The Present-Day Vitality of the Classical Tradition (Bloomington, 1962).
- Aristotle and the Problem of Value (Princeton, 1963).
- Plato’s View of Art (New York, 1972).
