= R. E. A. Palmer =

American historian (1933–2006)

Robert Everett Allen Palmer II (1933 – March 11, 2006) was a historian and a leading figure in the study of archaic Rome. At the time of his death was professor emeritus of classical studies at the University of Pennsylvania.

Palmer earned both his B.A. (1953) and his Ph.D. (1956) from Johns Hopkins University.

Palmer started his teaching career at the University of Illinois. He began his Penn career in 1961 as an assistant professor of classical studies and was promoted to associate professor in 1966, and professor in 1970.

Palmer was a historian of ancient Rome, with particular interests in Roman religion and epigraphy. He was the author of numerous articles and several books. His most important research was a project on the neighborhoods (vici) of ancient Rome.

Palmer died at his home in Haverford, Pennsylvania, at the age of 73.

== Selected works ==
1. Robert E. A. Palmer. “The Censors of 312 B.C. and the State Religion.” Historia: Zeitschrift Für Alte Geschichte 14, no. 3 (1965): 293–324. http://www.jstor.org/stable/4434886.
2. The king and the comitium: a study of Rome's oldest public document (1969).
3. The Archaic Community of the Romans (1970).
4. Roman Religion and Roman Empire (1974).
5. Palmer, R. E. A. “Customs on Market Goods Imported into the City of Rome.” Memoirs of the American Academy in Rome 36 (1980): 217–33. https://doi.org/10.2307/4238706.
6. Robert E. A. Palmer. “Studies of the Northern Campus Martius in Ancient Rome.” Transactions of the American Philosophical Society 80, no. 2 (1990): i–64. https://doi.org/10.2307/1006540.
7. Rome and Carthage at Peace (1997).

== Necrology ==
- University of Pennsylvania Almanac v. 52, no. 27 (28 March 2006).
- Obituary in The Philadelphia Inquirer
