= Julia Kindt =

German academic and writer (born 1975)

Julia Kindt FAHA
- Born: 1975 (age 50–51)
- Occupations: Academic, writer

Academic background
- Education: LMU Munich (MA); University of Cambridge (PhD)
- Doctoral advisor: Robin Osborne

Academic work
- Discipline: Classics
- Sub-discipline: Ancient Greek history and religion
- Institutions: University of Sydney
- Notable works: Rethinking Greek Religion, The Trojan Horse and Other Stories

Julia Kindt FAHA (born 1975) is a German academic and writer who specialises in ancient Greek history and religion. She is a professor at the Department of Classics and Ancient History at the University of Sydney, Australia.

== Career ==
Kindt graduated from LMU Munich in 2000 with a Master of Arts in Ancient History. She then studied at the University of Cambridge, where she completed a PhD in 2003. In 2005, she was selected as one of the inaugural Katharine Graham fellows at the University of Chicago; the fellowship was created by an endowment from the estate of the publisher of The Washington Post.

In 2012, Kindt published her first book, Rethinking Greek Religion, in which she suggests that the scholarly consensus that the polis is the central focus of ancient Greek religion needs to be re-examined. She argues that other aspects of ancient Greek religion deserve more scholarly attention than they have previously received.

Kindt's second book, Revisiting Delphi, was published in 2016. At the time of its publication she was an associate professor at the University of Sydney. She was also a senior editor of the Oxford Research Encyclopedia of Religion.

In 2018, she was selected as a Future Fellow with the Australian Research Council, under their ARC Future Fellowships program. The fellowship runs until 2022. She was also elected into the Australian Academy of the Humanities in 2018.

In 2019, she became a full professor in the Department of Classics and Ancient History at the University of Sydney. As of October 2021, she teaches courses in ancient Greek history and religion.

She is a member of the Editorial Board for Journal of Ancient History.

== Works ==
=== Authored ===
- Kindt, J. 2012. Rethinking Greek Religion. Cambridge University Press. ISBN 9780521110921
- Kindt, J. 2016. Revisiting Delphi: Religion and Storytelling in Ancient Greece. Cambridge University Press. ISBN 9781316585047
- Kindt, J. 2024. The Trojan Horse and Other Stories. Ten Ancient Creatures that Make Us Human. Cambridge University Press. ISBN 9781009411332

=== Edited ===
- Eidinow, E. and J. Kindt, eds. 2015. The Oxford Handbook of Ancient Greek Religion. Oxford University Press. ISBN 9780199642038
- E. Eidinow, J. Kindt and R. Osborne, eds. 2016. Theologies of Ancient Greek Religion. Cambridge University Press. ISBN 9781316597811
- Kindt, J. (ed.) 2021. Animals in Ancient Greek Religion. Routledge. ISBN 9781138388888
- Beck, H. and Kindt, J., eds. 2023. The Local Horizon of Ancient Greek Religion. Cambridge University Press. ISBN 9781009301862
