= Judith T. Zeitlin =

American literary and cultural historian

Judith T. Zeitlin (b. 1958; Chinese: 蔡九迪) is the William R. Kenan Jr. Distinguished Service Professor of East Asian Languages and Civilizations at the University of Chicago. Her areas of interest are Ming-Qing literary and cultural history, with specialties in the classical tale and drama. In 2011 she was awarded a Guggenheim Fellowship.

Zeitlin is "Among the most active of the literary scholars who focus on women."

She is the daughter of classics scholar Froma Zeitlin, the sister of economic historian Jonathan Zeitlin., the wife of art historian Wu Hung, and the mother of media scholar Lida Zeitlin-Wu.

== Selected publications ==
- Historian of the Strange: Pu Songling and the Chinese Classical Tale_志怪史家:蒲松齡與中國古代傳奇小說 (Stanford, 1993)
- Writing and Materiality in China, co-edited with Lydia Liu (Harvard, 2003)
- "Shared Dreams: The Story of the Three Wives' Commentary on The Peony Pavilion" (1994)
- "Disappearing Verses: Writings on Walls and Anxieties of Loss" in Writing and Materiality (2003)
- "The Life and Death of the Image: Ghosts and Portraits in Chinese Literature" in Body and Face in Chinese Visual Culture, ed. Wu Hung and Katherine Tsiang (Harvard, 2005)
- "Notes of Flesh: The Courtesan's Song in Seventeenth-Century China," in The Courtesan's Arts: Cross-Cultural Perspectives, ed. Martha Feldman and Bonnie Gordon (Oxford, 2006)
- "The Return of the Palace Lady" in Cultural Innovation and Dynastic Decline, ed. David Wang and Wei Shang (Harvard, 2006)
- "Music and Performance in Palace of Lasting Life" in Trauma and Transcendence in Chinese Literature, ed. Idema, Li, and Widmer (2006)
- "Xiaoshuo" in The Novel, ed. Franco Moretti (2006)

=== Selected articles in Chinese by Cai Jiudi 蔡九迪 ===
- Chongshen yu fenshen: Mingmo Zhongguo xiqu zhong de hun dan. [Doubling and Splitting the Phantom Heroine in Seventeenth-Century Drama] *In Tang Xianzu yu Mudanting yanjiu [Research on Tang Xianzu and Peony Pavilion], ed. Hua Wei (Taipei, 2006)
- Tibishi yu Ming Qing zhi ji dui funü shi di shouji [Writing on Walls and the Collection of Women’s Poetry in the Late Ming and Early Qing.]
- In Ming Qing wenxue yu xingbie yanjiu [Ming Qing Literature and Gender], ed. Zhang Hongsheng, (Nanjing, 2002)
