= John V. A. Fine (1903–1987) =

American classical scholar (1903–1987)

- Born: John Van Antwerp Fine; December 3, 1903; Princeton, New Jersey, U.S.
- Died: January 17, 1987 (aged 83); Princeton, New Jersey, U.S.
- Children: John V. A. Fine Jr.

Academic background
- Education: Princeton University (A.B.); Yale University (Ph.D.)

Academic work
- Discipline: Classics
- Sub-discipline: Ancient Greek history, Greek law, Greek epigraphy
- Institutions: Princeton University
- Notable works: The Ancient Greeks: A Critical History

John Van Antwerp Fine (December 3, 1903 – January 17, 1987) was an American classical scholar and Ewing Professor of Greek Language and Literature at Princeton University. A specialist in ancient Greek history and institutions, he was known especially for his studies of Athenian land tenure and for his widely used survey The Ancient Greeks: A Critical History.

== Early life and education ==
Fine was born in Princeton, New Jersey. Fine was the son of John Burchard Fine, founder of the Princeton Preparatory School, and the nephew of the Princeton mathematician and dean Henry Burchard Fine. Fine attended Phillips Academy in Andover, Massachusetts, graduating cum laude in 1921 with honors in German and Latin. He graduated from Princeton University before earning his doctorate in classics at Yale University.

== Academic career ==
Fine taught at Yale University and Williams College before joining the Princeton University faculty in 1940 as a visiting lecturer. He was appointed assistant professor of classics at Princeton in 1941 and remained there for the rest of his career. During his tenure, Fine held several named professorships, serving as Andrew Fleming West Professor of Classics from 1940 to 1941, Musgrave Professor of Latin from 1946 to 1949, and Ewing Professor of Greek Language and Literature from 1949 until his retirement.

He retired from Princeton in 1972. His teaching and scholarship focused primarily on ancient Greek history, legal institutions, and economic life.

== Scholarship ==
Fine's best-known scholarly monograph was Horoi: Studies in Mortgage, Real Security and Land Tenure in Ancient Athens, a detailed examination of the mortgage stones (horoi) of ancient Attica and what they reveal about Athenian property law and economic structures.

He was also the author of The Ancient Greeks: A Critical History, a widely used general history of ancient Greece intended for students and general readers. In addition to his books, Fine published numerous articles and reviews on Greek history, epigraphy, and law.

== Personal life ==
Fine was married to Elizabeth Bunting Fine. Their son was the historian John V. A. Fine Jr., a specialist in Balkan and Byzantine history.

Fine died on January 17, 1987, at a nursing home in Princeton, New Jersey, at the age of 83. He was survived by his wife, a sister, two grandchildren, and his son John Jr.

== Selected works ==
- Horoi: Studies in Mortgage, Real Security and Land Tenure in Ancient Athens
- The Ancient Greeks: A Critical History
