= List of Cambridge Companions to Literature and Classics =

The Cambridge Companions to Literature and Classics form a book series published by Cambridge University Press. Each book is a collection of essays on the topic commissioned by the publisher.

== Volumes ==
The Cambridge Companion...
to...	Editor(s)	Publ.
Sherlock Holmes	Janice M. Allan, Christopher Pittard	2019
Roman Comedy	Martin T. Dinter	2019
Edward Albee	Stephen J. Bottoms	
Margaret Atwood	Coral Ann Howells	
W. H. Auden	Stan Smith	
Jane Austen	Edward Copeland and Juliet McMaster (second edition)	
James Baldwin	Michele Elam	2015
Beckett	John Pilling	
Bede	Scott DeGregorio	
Aphra Behn	Derek Hughes and Janet Todd	
Walter Benjamin	David S. Ferris	
William Blake	Morris Eaves	
Giovanni Boccaccio	Guyda Armstrong, Rhiannon Daniels, and Stephen J. Milner	
Jorge Luis Borges	Edwin Williamson	
Bertolt Brecht	Peter Thomson and Glendyr Sacks (second edition)	
The Brontës	Heather Glen	
John Bunyan	Anne Dunan-Page	
Frances Burney	Peter Sabor	
Byron	Drummond Bone	
Albert Camus	Edward J. Hughes	
Willa Cather	Marilee Lindemann	
Miguel de Cervantes	Anthony J. Cascardi	
Geoffrey Chaucer	Piero Boitani and Jill Mann (second edition)	
Anton Chekhov	Vera Gottlieb and Paul Allain	
Kate Chopin	Janet Beer	
Caryl Churchill	Elaine Aston and Elin Diamond	
Cicero	Catherine Steel	
Samuel Taylor Coleridge	Lucy Newlyn	
Wilkie Collins	Jenny Bourne Taylor	
Joseph Conrad	J. H. Stape	
H.D. (Hilda Doolittle)	Nephie J. Christodoulides and Polina Mackay	
Dante Alighieri	Rachel Jacoff (second edition)	
Daniel Defoe	John Richetti	
Don DeLillo	John N. Duvall	
Charles Dickens	John O. Jordan	
Emily Dickinson	Wendy Martin	
John Donne	Achsah Guibbory	
Fyodor Dostoevsky	W. J. Leatherbarrow	
Theodore Dreiser	Leonard Cassuto and Claire Virginia Eby	
John Dryden	Steven N. Zwicker	
W. E. B. Du Bois	Shamoon Zamir	
George Eliot	George Levine	
T. S. Eliot	A. David Moody	
Ralph Ellison	Ross Posnock	
Ralph Waldo Emerson	Joel Porte and Saundra Morris	
William Faulkner	Philip M. Weinstein	
Henry Fielding	Claude Rawson	
F. Scott Fitzgerald	Ruth Prigozy	
Gustave Flaubert	Timothy Unwin	
E. M. Forster	David Bradshaw	
Benjamin Franklin	Carla Mulford	
Brian Friel	Anthony Roche	
Robert Frost	Robert Faggen	
Gabriel García Márquez	Philip Swanson	
Elizabeth Gaskell	Jill L. Matus	
Johann Wolfgang von Goethe	Lesley Sharpe	
Günter Grass	Stuart Taberner	
Thomas Hardy	Dale Kramer	
David Hare	Richard Boon	
Nathaniel Hawthorne	Richard Millington	
Seamus Heaney	Bernard O'Donoghue	
Ernest Hemingway	Scott Donaldson	
Homer	Robert Fowler	
Horace	Stephen Harrison	
Ted Hughes	Terry Gifford	
Henrik Ibsen	James McFarlane	
Henry James	Jonathan Freedman	
Samuel Johnson	Greg Clingham	
Ben Jonson	Richard Harp and Stanley Stewart	
James Joyce	Derek Attridge (second edition)	
Franz Kafka	Julian Preece	
John Keats	Susan J. Wolfson	
Rudyard Kipling	Howard J. Booth	
Jacques Lacan	Jean-Michel Rabaté	
D. H. Lawrence	Anne Fernihough	
Primo Levi	Robert Gordon	
Lucretius	Stuart Gillespie and Philip Hardie	
Niccolò Machiavelli	John M. Najemy	
David Mamet	Christopher Bigsby	
Thomas Mann	Ritchie Robertson	
Christopher Marlowe	Patrick Cheney	
Andrew Marvell	Derek Hirst and Steven N. Zwicker	
Herman Melville	Robert S. Levine	
Arthur Miller	Christopher Bigsby (second edition)	
Milton	Dennis Danielson (second edition)	
Molière	David Bradby and Andrew Calder	
Toni Morrison	Justine Tally	
Alice Munro	David Staines	
Vladimir Nabokov	Julian W. Connolly	
Eugene O'Neill	Michael Manheim	
George Orwell	John Rodden	
Ovid	Philip Hardie	
Petrarch	Albert Russell Ascoli and Unn Falkeid	
Harold Pinter	Peter Raby (second edition)	
Sylvia Plath	Jo Gill	
Edgar Allan Poe	Kevin J. Hayes	
Alexander Pope	Pat Rogers	
Ezra Pound	Ira B. Nadel	
Marcel Proust	Richard Bales	
Alexander Pushkin	Andrew Kahn	
François Rabelais	John O'Brien	
Rainer Maria Rilke	Karen Leeder and Robert Vilain	
Philip Roth	Timothy Parrish	
Salman Rushdie	Abdulrazak Gurnah	
John Ruskin	Francis O'Gorman	
William Shakespeare	Margareta de Grazia and Stanley Wells (second edition)	
Shakespearean Comedy	Alexander Leggatt	
Shakespeare and Contemporary Dramatists	Ton Hoenselaars	
Shakespeare and Popular Culture	Robert Shaughnessy	
Shakespearean Tragedy	Claire McEachern (second edition)	
Shakespeare on Film	Russell Jackson (second edition)	
Shakespeare on Stage	Stanley Wells and Sarah Stanton	
Shakespeare's History Plays	Michael Hattaway	
Shakespeare's Last Plays	Catherine M. S. Alexander	
Shakespeare's Poetry	Patrick Cheney	
George Bernard Shaw	Christopher Innes	
Percy Bysshe Shelley	Timothy Morton	
Mary Shelley	Esther Schor	
Sam Shepard	Matthew C. Roudané	
Edmund Spenser	Andrew Hadfield	
Laurence Sterne	Thomas Keymer	
Wallace Stevens	John N. Serio	
Tom Stoppard	Katherine E. Kelly	
Harriet Beecher Stowe	Cindy Weinstein	
August Strindberg	Michael Robinson	
Jonathan Swift	Christopher Fox	
J. M. Synge	P. J. Mathews	
Tacitus	A. J. Woodman	
Henry David Thoreau	Joel Myerson	
Leo Tolstoy	Donna Tussing Orwin	
Anthony Trollope	Carolyn Dever and Lisa Niles	
Mark Twain	Forrest G. Robinson	
John Updike	Stacey Olster	
Mario Vargas Llosa	Efrain Kristal and John King	
Virgil	Charles Martindale	
Voltaire	Nicholas Cronk	
Edith Wharton	Millicent Bell	
Walt Whitman	Ezra Greenspan	
Oscar Wilde	Peter Raby	
Tennessee Williams	Matthew C. Roudané	
August Wilson	Christopher Bigsby	
Mary Wollstonecraft	Claudia L. Johnson	
Virginia Woolf	Susan Sellers (second edition)	
William Wordsworth	Stephen Gill	
W. B. Yeats	Marjorie Howes and John Kelly	
Xenophon	Michael A. Flower	
Zola	Brian Nelson	
The Actress	Maggie B. Gale and John Stokes	
The African American Novel	Maryemma Graham	
The African American Slave Narrative	Audrey A. Fisch	
Theatre History	David Wiles and Christine Dymkowski	
African American Theatre	Harvey Young	
Allegory	Rita Copeland and Peter Struck	
American Crime Fiction	Catherine Ross Nickerson	
American Modernism	Walter Kalaidjian	
American Poetry since 1945	Jennifer Ashton	
American Realism and Naturalism	Donald Pizer	
American Travel Writing	Alfred Bendixen and Judith Hamera	
American Women Playwrights	Brenda Murphy	
Ancient Rhetoric	Erik Gunderson	
Arthurian Legend	Elizabeth Archibald and Ad Putter	
Australian Literature	Elizabeth Webby	
British Literature of the French Revolution	Pamela Clemit	
British Romanticism	Stuart Curran (second edition)	
British Romantic Poetry	James Chandler and Maureen N. McLane	
British Theatre, 1730–1830	Jane Moody and Daniel O'Quinn	
Canadian Literature	Eva-Marie Kröller	
Children's Literature	M. O. Grenby and Andrea Immel	
The Classic Russian Novel	Malcolm V. Jones and Robin Feuer Miller	1998
Contemporary Irish Poetry	Matthew Campbell	
Creative Writing	David Morley and Philip Neilsen	
Crime Fiction	Martin Priestman	
Early Modern Women's Writing	Laura Lunger Knoppers	
The Eighteenth-Century Novel	John Richetti	
Eighteenth-Century Poetry	John Sitter	
Emma	Peter Sabor	
English Literature, 1500–1600	Arthur F. Kinney	
English Literature, 1650–1740	Steven N. Zwicker	
English Literature, 1740–1830	Thomas Keymer and Jon Mee	
English Literature, 1830–1914	Joanne Shattock	
English Novelists	Adrian Poole	
English Poetry, Donne to Marvell	Thomas N. Corns	
English Poets	Claude Rawson	
English Renaissance Drama	A. R. Braunmuller and Michael Hattaway (second edition)	
English Renaissance Tragedy	Emma Smith and Garrett A. Sullivan Jr.	
English Restoration Theatre	Deborah C. Payne Fisk	
The Epic	Catherine Bates	
European Modernism	Pericles Lewis	
European Novelists	Michael Bell	
Fairy Tales	Maria Tatar	
Fantasy Literature	Edward James and Farah Mendlesohn	
Feminist Literary Theory	Ellen Rooney	
Fiction in the Romantic Period	Richard Maxwell and Katie Trumpener	
The Fin de Siècle	Gail Marshall	
The French Enlightenment	Daniel Brewer	
French Literature	John D. Lyons	
The French Novel: From 1800 to the Present	Timothy Unwin	
Gay and Lesbian Writing	Hugh Stevens	
German Romanticism	Nicholas Saul	2009
Gothic Fiction	Jerrold E. Hogle	
The Graphic Novel	Stephen E. Tabachnick	
The Greek and Roman Novel	Tim Whitmarsh	
Greek and Roman Theatre	Marianne McDonald and J. Michael Walton	
Greek Comedy	Martin Revermann	
Greek Lyric	Felix Budelmann	
Greek Mythology	Roger D. Woodard	
Greek Tragedy	P. E. Easterling	
The Harlem Renaissance	George Hutchinson	
The History of the Book	Leslie Howsam	
The Irish Novel	John Wilson Foster	
The Italian Novel	Peter Bondanella and Andrea Ciccarelli	
The Italian Renaissance	Michael Wyatt	
Jewish American Literature	Hana Wirth-Nesher and Michael P. Kramer	
The Latin American Novel	Efraín Kristal	
The Literature of the First World War	Vincent Sherry	
The Literature of London	Lawrence Manley	
The Literature of Los Angeles	Kevin R. McNamara	
The Literature of New York	Cyrus Patell and Bryan Waterman	
The Literature of Paris	Anna-Louise Milne	
The Literature of World War II	Marina MacKay	
Literature on Screen	Deborah Cartmell and Imelda Whelehan	
Medieval English Culture	Andrew Galloway	
Medieval English Literature	Larry Scanlon	
Medieval English Mysticism	Samuel Fanous and Vincent Gillespie	
Medieval English Theatre	Richard Beadle and Alan J. Fletcher (second edition)	
Medieval French Literature	Simon Gaunt and Sarah Kay	
Medieval Romance	Roberta L. Krueger	
Medieval Women's Writing	Carolyn Dinshaw and David Wallace	
Modern American Culture	Christopher Bigsby	
Modern British Women Playwrights	Elaine Aston and Janelle Reinelt	
Modern French Culture	Nicholas Hewitt	
Modern German Culture	Eva Kolinsky and Wilfried van der Will	
The Modern German Novel	Graham Bartram	
The Modern Gothic	Jerrold E. Hogle	
Modern Irish Culture	Joe Cleary and Claire Connolly	
Modern Italian Culture	Zygmunt G. Baranski and Rebecca J. West	
Modern Latin American Culture	John King	
Modern Russian Culture	Nicholas Rzhevsky	
Modern Spanish Culture	David T. Gies	
Modernism	Michael Levenson (second edition)	
The Modernist Novel	Morag Shiach	
Modernist Poetry	Alex Davis and Lee M. Jenkins	
Modernist Women Writers	Maren Tova Linett	
Narrative	David Herman	
Native American Literature	Joy Porter and Kenneth M. Roemer	
Nineteenth-Century American Women's Writing	Dale M. Bauer and Philip Gould	
Old English Literature	Malcolm Godden and Michael Lapidge (second edition)	
Performance Studies	Tracy C. Davis	
Piers Plowman	Andrew Cole and Andrew Galloway	
Popular Fiction	David Glover and Scott McCracken	
Postcolonial Literary Studies	Neil Lazarus	
Postmodern American Fiction	Paula Geyh	
Postmodernism	Steven Connor	
The Pre-Raphaelites	Elizabeth Prettejohn	
Pride and Prejudice	Janet Todd	
Renaissance Humanism	Jill Kraye	
The Roman Historians	Andrew Feldherr	
Roman Satire	Kirk Freudenburg	
Science fiction	Edward James and Farah Mendlesohn	
Scottish Literature	Gerald Carruthers and Liam McIlvanney	
Sensation Fiction	Andrew Mangham	
The Sonnet	A. D. Cousins and Peter Howarth	
The Spanish Novel: From 1600 to the Present	Harriet Turner and Adelaida López de Martínez	
Textual Scholarship	Neil Fraistat and Julia Flanders	
Travel Writing	Peter Hulme and Tim Youngs	
Twentieth-Century British and Irish Women's Poetry	Jane Dowson	
The Twentieth-Century English Novel	Robert L. Caserio	
Twentieth-Century English Poetry	Neil Corcoran	
Twentieth-Century Irish Drama	Shaun Richards	
Twentieth-Century Russian Literature	Marina Balina and Evgeny Dobrenko	
Utopian Literature	Gregory Claeys	
Victorian and Edwardian Theatre	Kerry Powell	
The Victorian Novel	Deirdre David (second edition)	
Victorian Poetry	Joseph Bristow	
Victorian Women's Writing	Linda H. Peterson	
War Writing	Kate McLoughlin	
Women's Writing in Britain, 1660–1789	Catherine Ingrassia	
Women's Writing in the Romantic Period	Devoney Looser	
Writing of the English Revolution	N. H. Keeble	
