= Edward Courtney (classicist) =

Northern Irish classicist (1932–2019)

- Born: 22 March 1932; Belfast, Northern Ireland
- Died: 24 November 2019 (aged 87); Charlottesville, Virginia

Academic background
- Education: Trinity College Dublin
- Influences: Robin Nisbet; Eduard Fraenkel

Academic work
- Discipline: Classics
- Sub-discipline: Latin literature
- Institutions: King's College London; Stanford University; University of Virginia
- Influenced: Michael Winterbottom; Dirk Obbink; Cynthia Damon; Susan Treggiari

Edward Courtney (22 March 1932 – 24 November 2019) was a Northern Irish classicist. After reading Classics at Trinity College Dublin, he taught Latin literature at King's College London until 1983. He then worked in the United States and held the Basil L. Gildersleeve Professorship at the University of Virginia when he retired. He specialised in textual criticism, publishing critical editions of Valerius Flaccus, Juvenal, Statius, and Petronius.

== Life and career ==
Edward Courtney was born on 22 March 1932 in Belfast. His parents were George Courtney, who worked as a legal administrator, and his wife Kathleen. From 1946, he was educated at the Royal Belfast Academical Institution, where, encouraged by his teachers H. C. Fay and John Cowser, he began to develop an interest in Latin literature. In 1950, he began studying Classics as a scholar at Trinity College Dublin. He graduated in 1954 and was awarded the Gold Medal in Classics for his results.

In 1954, Courtney was hired as a research lecturer at Christ Church, a constituent college of the University of Oxford. Two senior colleagues exerted particular influence on him: the Horace scholar Robin Nisbet and Eduard Fraenkel, the former Corpus Christi Professor of Latin. In 1959, he left Oxford to become a lecturer at King's College London. Having worked there for more than 20 years, he took up to the Ely Professorship of Classics at Stanford University in 1983. From 1993 until his retirement he was the inaugural Basil L. Gildersleeve Professor at the University of Virginia. He died on 24 November 2019 in Charlottesville, Virginia.

== Work ==
Courtney specialised in the textual criticism of Latin poetry. He published critical editions of Valerius Flaccus, Juvenal, Statius, Petronius, and of poetry surviving only in fragments (The Fragmentary Latin Poets). Of the latter, the Latinist Michael Reeve wrote that he knew of no other contemporary scholar "who could have tackled with such erudition and independence of judgement" the topic of fragmentary poetry.

== Recognition ==
In 2002, a group of classicists who were influenced by Courtney published a Festschrift in his honour entitled (Vertis in usum: Studies in Honor of Edward Courtney). It included papers by Michael Winterbottom, Dirk Obbink, Cynthia Damon, and Susan Treggiari among others.

== Bibliography ==
- Miller, John. F.; Damon, Cynthia; Myers, K. Sara (2002). "Preface". In Miller, John. F.; Damon, Cynthia; Myers, K. Sarah (eds.). Vertis in usum: Studies in Honor of Edward Courtney. Munich and Leipzig: K. G. Saur Verlag. p. vii. ISBN 9783598777103.
- Reeve, Michael (1999). "Review of E. Courtney The Latin Fragmentary Poets". The Classical Review (49): 42–45. doi:10.1093/cr/49.1.42. ISSN 0009-840X. JSTOR 713869.
- Woodman, A. J. (24 November 2019). "Edward Courtney 1932–2019" (PDF). University of Virginia Department of Classics.
