= Tobias Reinhardt =

German classical scholar

Tobias Reinhardt (born 31 August 1971) is a German classical scholar, specialising in Latin literature and ancient philosophy. Since 2008, he has been the Corpus Christi Professor of Latin at the University of Oxford and a Fellow of Corpus Christi College, Oxford.

== Early life and education ==
Reinhardt was born on 31 August 1971 in Gross-Gerau, West Germany. He was educated at Kronberg-Gymnasium Aschaffenburg. He then studied Latin and Ancient Greek at the University of Frankfurt, where he completed the Staatsexamen. In 1997, he matriculated into Corpus Christi College, Oxford to undertake postgraduate studies in classical philology. His doctoral supervisors were Michael Frede and Michael Winterbottom. He completed his Doctor of Philosophy (PhD) degree in 2000 with a thesis titled "A commentary on Cicero's 'Topica'".

== Academic career ==
During Trinity Term of the 2000/2001 academic year, Reinhardt was a college lecturer in classical philosophy at New College, Oxford and in Latin literature at Corpus Christi College, Oxford. For the 2001/2002 academic year, he was a junior research fellow in ancient philosophy at Merton College, Oxford. In 2002, he was elected a Fellow of Somerville College, Oxford, where he was also tutor in Latin and Ancient Greek. He was additionally a university lecturer in classical languages and literature in the Faculty of Classics, University of Oxford between 2002 and 2008. In 2008, he was appointed Corpus Christi Professor of Latin, and as such was elected a Fellow of Corpus Christi College, Oxford. In 2022, Reinhardt published an English-language commentary on Cicero's Academica, completing a project he began in 1999.

== Selected works ==
- Reinhardt, Tobias (2000). Das Buch E der aristotelischen Topik - Untersuchungen zur Echtheitsfrage (in German). Göttingen: Vandenhoeck & Ruprecht. ISBN 978-3525252284.
- Reinhardt, Tobias, ed. (2003). Cicero's Topica. Oxford: Oxford University Press. ISBN 978-0199263462.
- Reinhardt, Tobias; Lapidge, Michael; Adams, J. N., eds. (2005). Aspects of the Language of Latin Prose. Oxford: Oxford University Press. ISBN 9780197263327.
- Reinhardt, Tobias; Winterbottom, Michael, eds. (2006). Quintilian Institutio Oratoria Book 2. Oxford: Oxford University Press. ISBN 9780199262656.
- Reinhardt, Tobias. Cicero's Academici Libri and Lucullus: a commentary with introduction and translations. Oxford: Oxford University Press, 2022. ISBN 9780199277148

Academic offices
Preceded by Philip Hardie	Corpus Christi Professor of Latin; University of Oxford; 2008 to present	Incumbent
