= Blair Worden =

Historian and academic (born 1945)

Blair Worden FBA FRHistS
- Born: Alastair Blair Worden; 12 January 1945 (age 81)
- Occupations: Historian and academic

Academic background
- Education: Pembroke College, Oxford; Harvard University
- Thesis: Politics and policy of the Rump Parliament, 1648-1653 (1971)
- Doctoral advisor: Anne Whiteman

Academic work
- Discipline: History
- Sub-discipline: Early modern Britain; English Civil War; Renaissance literature; Political history
- Institutions: Pembroke College, Cambridge; St Edmund Hall, Oxford; Royal Holloway, University of London

Alastair Blair Worden, FBA FRHistS (born 12 January 1945), usually cited as Blair Worden, is a historian, among the leading authorities on the period of the English Civil War and on relations between literature and history more generally in the early modern period.

== Education and career ==
He matriculated as an undergraduate at Pembroke College, Oxford, in 1963. After spending a year as a visiting student at Harvard he began graduate research at Oxford in 1967. During and after his doctoral studies he held a research fellowship at Pembroke College, Cambridge. After a period as a Fellow of St Edmund Hall, Oxford, teaching History, he took up a position as a Professor at Royal Holloway, University of London. In 1997 he was elected a Fellow of the British Academy, and in 1999 he delivered the British Academy's Raleigh Lecture on History. As of 2011 he is an Emeritus Fellow of St Edmund Hall. He is well known for his revolutionary article "Oliver Cromwell and the Sin of Achan", which changed established historical perceptions about what exactly caused Oliver Cromwell to reject the offer of the Crown.

== Books ==
- The Rump Parliament 1648–53 (1974); 1977 pbk edition
- (ed.) Edmund Ludlow: A Voyce from the Watchtower (1978)
- (ed.) History and Imagination: essays in honour of H. R. Trevor-Roper (1981)
- (ed.) Stuart England (1986)
- The Sound of Virtue: Philip Sidney's Arcadia and Elizabethan politics (1996)
- Roundhead reputations: the English Civil Wars and the passions of posterity (2001)
- Literature and politics in Cromwellian England: John Milton, Andrew Marvell, Marchamont Nedham (2007)
- The English Civil Wars 1640–1660 (2010); ebook
- God's Instruments: Political Conduct in the England of Oliver Cromwell (2012)

== Selected articles and chapters ==
- "The Commonwealth Kidney of Algernon Sidney", Journal of British Studies, 24 (1985), 1–40 JSTOR 175443
- "Andrew Marvell, Oliver Cromwell and the Horatian ode", in Politics of Discourse: The literature and history of seventeenth-century England, ed. Kevin Sharpe and Steven N. Zwicker (Berkeley: University of California Press, 1987), pp. 147–80
- "Cromwellian Oxford", in The History of the University of Oxford, ed. Nicholas Tyacke (Oxford: Clarendon Press, 1997), pp. 733–72
- "The Question of Secularization", in A Nation Transformed: England after the Restoration, ed. Alan Houston and Stephen Pincus (Cambridge: Cambridge University Press, 2001), pp. 20–40
- "The Revolution of 1688-9 and the English republican tradition", in The Anglo-Dutch Moment: Essays on the Glorious Revolution and Its World Impact, ed. Jonathan Israel (Cambridge: Cambridge University Press, 2003), pp. 241–77
- "Oliver Cromwell and the Protectorate", Transactions of the Royal Historical Society, 6th ser., 20 (2010), 57–84 JSTOR 41432386
- "Oliver Cromwell and the Sin of Achan", in Cromwell and the Interregnum: The Essential Readings, ed. D. L. Smith (Oxford: Blackwell, 2008), pp. 37–60
