= The Cambridge Companion to Shakespeare's Poetry =

- Editor: Patrick Cheney
- Publisher: Cambridge University Press
- Publication date: 28 May 2007
- ISBN: 9781139001274

The Cambridge Companion to Shakespeare's Poetry is a nonfiction book edited by Patrick Cheney. It was published in 2007 by Cambridge University Press.

== Overview ==
This book consists of a collection of fourteen essays and an introduction surveying the cultural climate and surroundings of Shakespeare's day.
