= Henry Nettleship =

19th century British schoolteacher and classical scholar

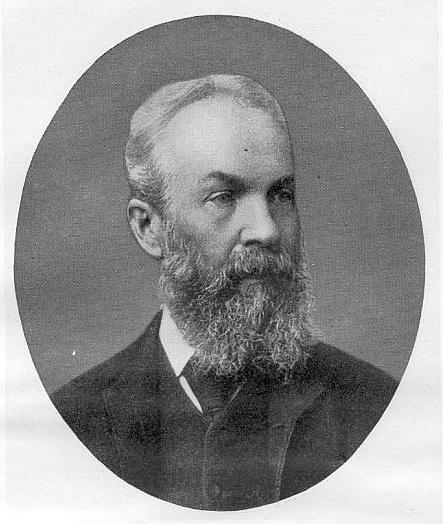
- Born: 5 May 1839; Kettering, Northamptonshire, England
- Died: 10 July 1893 (aged 54)
- Education: Lancing College, Durham School

Henry Nettleship (5 May 1839 – 10 July 1893) was an English classical scholar.

== Life ==
Nettleship was born at Kettering, and was educated at Lancing College, Durham School and Charterhouse schools, and gained a scholarship for entry to Corpus Christi College, Oxford in 1858. In 1861, he was elected to a fellowship at Lincoln, which he vacated on his marriage in 1870 to Matilda Steel, eldest daughter of his colleague Rev. T.H. Steel at Harrow. In 1868, he became an assistant master at Harrow, but in 1873 he returned to Oxford, and was elected to a fellowship at Corpus. In 1878 he was appointed to succeed Edwin Palmer as the Corpus Professor of Latin, and held the post until his death.

In 1879, Nettleship sat on the committee which was formed to create an Oxford women's college "in which no distinction will be made between students on the ground of their belonging to different religious denominations." This resulted in the founding of Somerville Hall (later Somerville College).

He had a son, Henry Melvill (who died aged 20) and a daughter, Edith.

== Works ==
Nettleship had always been interested in Virgil, and a good deal of his time was devoted to his favourite poet. After John Conington's death in 1869, he saw his edition of Virgil through the press, and revised and corrected subsequent editions of the work. In 1875, he had undertaken to compile a new Latin lexicon for the Clarendon Press, but the work proved more than he could accomplish, and in 1887 he published some of the results of twelve years of labour in a volume entitled Contributions to Latin Lexicography, a genuine piece of original work.

In conjunction with John Edwin Sandys, Nettleship revised and edited Oskar Seyffert's Dictionary of Classical Antiquities, and he contributed to a volume entitled Essays on the Endowment of Research an article on "The Present Relations between Classical Research and Classical Education in England," in which he pointed out the great value of the professorial lecture in Germany.

In his views on the research question, he was a follower of Mark Pattison, whose essays he edited in 1889 for the Clarendon Press. In Lectures and Essays on Subjects connected with Latin Literature and Scholarship, Nettleship revised and republished some of his previous publications. A second series of these, published in 1895, and edited by F. Haverfield, contained a memoir by Mrs M. Nettleship.

== Legacy ==
In 1895 Nettleship's widow Matilda donated his library to the Association for Promoting the Higher Education of Women (AEW) where it formed a shared collection for all women students. Based in the attics of the Clarendon Building, it later moved to Jowett Walk and then became the library of the Society of Oxford Home-Students (later St Anne's College) in 1934. In the present day, the library at St Anne's College is referred to as the Nettleship Collection.
