= Dictionary of Classical Antiquities =

- Author: Oskar Seyffert
- Language: English
- Subject: Classical antiquity
- Published: 1891

The Dictionary of Classical Antiquities (1891), covers Ancient Greek and Roman antiquities, mythology and literature in over 2,500 articles.

It was written in German by Oskar Seyffert and edited by Henry Nettleship and John Edwin Sandys.

== Reception ==
The book received several reviews. A. S. Wilkins reviewed it in The Classical Review. He praised the work of Henry Nettleship and John Edwin Sandys. He also liked the illustrations. Wilkins was less positive about the lack of references and said some entries were too short.

The Atlantic reviewed the book. The review praised its mix of short entries and longer articles. It also noted the coverage of mythology and the illustrations. The book was described as useful to both students and general readers.
