= Masks in western dance =

Cultural phenomena

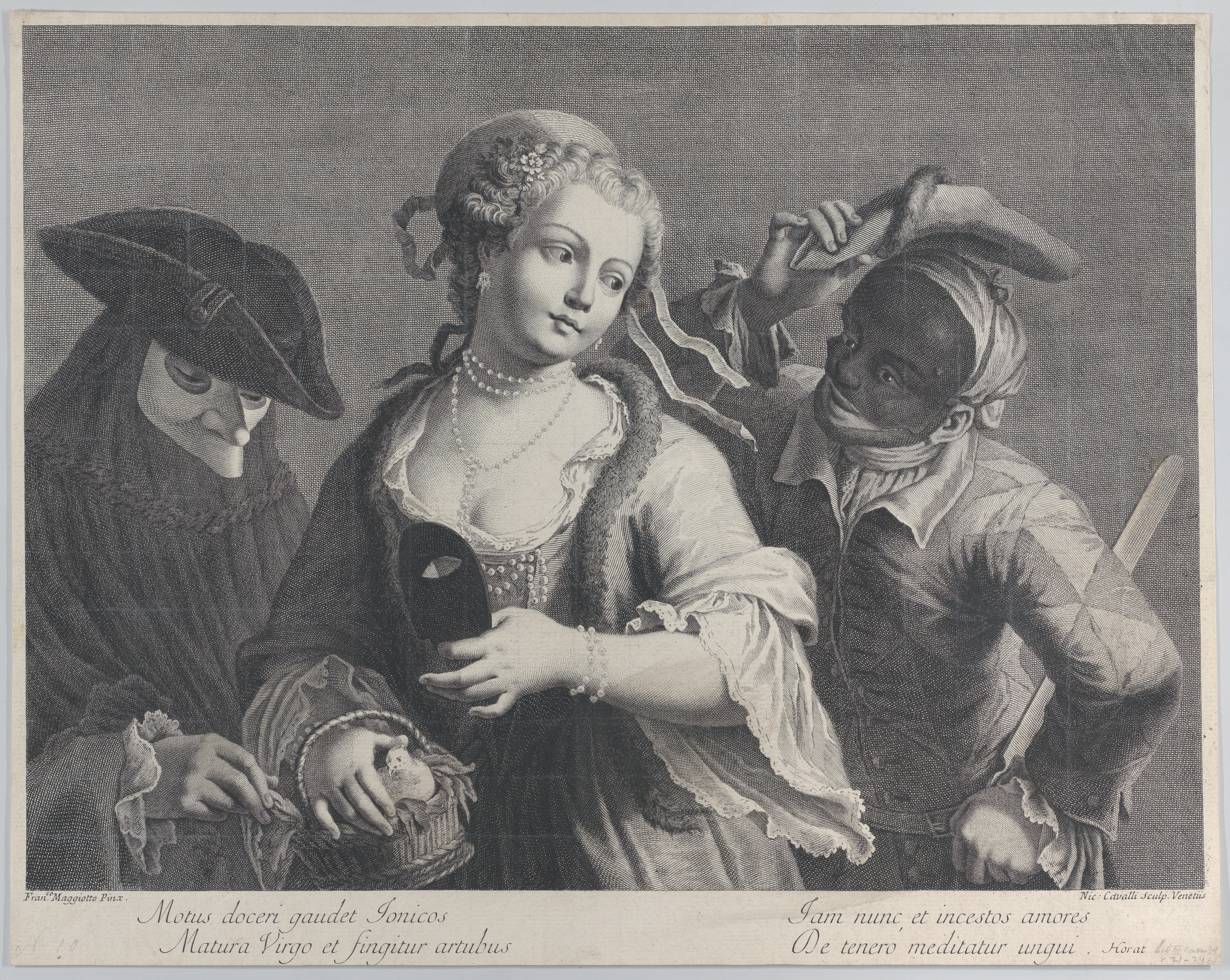
Three half-length figures from a Venetian carnival, 1750–1822

Masks have a long history of use in rituals and dance. In the Western world, masks have been used in dances to portray certain characters, disguise identity, and to depersonalize the dancer. The types of masks and their usage in dance have evolved in time, and are still employed in modern choreographic works.

== History ==
=== Ancient Greece and Rome ===
The use of masks in dance in the West traces back to ancient Greece. Grecian dancers would use masks for religious rituals to embody Dionysus and Appollo. In Greek theaters, masks are used to enhance the drama of tragedy and comedy, illustrated by kordax, a mask dance of comedy characterized of uninhibited lasciviousness. Romans used mask in sensual performances where dancers wore briefs and sheer clothing, as a means to cover the identity of the dancers.

=== Middle Ages and early Christianity ===
In the Middle Ages, masks were mostly used to portray a certain character. In ballroom dances, masks were used to create distance for performers dancing entrées from others in crowded ballrooms. They used mask to create a uniformity in characters in the chorus, such as Shepherds, Sailors, Nymphs, and Priests. Morris dance, a religious folk dance stemmed from early Christianity that portrays the dueling between Christians and the Moors, North African Muslims who tried to conquer Europe. Masks or blackened faces are used in the pantomimes and fencing scenes to represent the Moors, and bizarre costumes were used to mock them as foolish enemies. In Slavic and Romanian Morris dance, it is less a dance about combat and more about religious folklores and rituals. In the fold dance The Roumanian Hobby-Horse, the Cǎluşari, the comic figure the dumb man, is masked and dressed in comical costumes. The mask is made to look like a stork's head with a movable beak, contributing to the character's nickname “beak”.

=== Renaissance period ===
During the Renaissance, masks were used both for disguise and character portrayal. Masque, a precursor to masquerades, is a festival where guests wear masks to disguise themselves, and offer gifts to their hosts, after which they dance in celebration. Masque then evolved into a dance form performed on stage, within a play. Masks are used to portray mythical characters or characters of color, as documented in The Masque of Blackness. In sixteenth century, when dance was still dominated by men, travesty came into place, where men wore masks and dresses to act as women in dance. During late seventeenth century, Louis XIV brought the ballet de cour into one of the most highly regarded noble practices and entertainment. Noble characters wore light colored masks with ideal, symmetrical features with subtle, neutral expressions. Grotesque dancers, who performed as comic characters, also wore masks with exaggerated features and expressions to add to the comedic qualities of the characters.

== Modern and contemporary works ==
Masks in modern and contemporary dance are not used for disguise or for symbolizing a certain character, but to erase the sense of identity and create a sense of depersonalization and remoteness. In Mary Wigman’s Witch Dance, she wore a white mask with a large cloak, only leaving her hands and feet uncovered. With her eerie choreography, the mask and the cloak add to the effect of her not being completely human, but something odd and out of the common realm. In The Green Table by Kurt Jooss, a ballet exploring the idea of death, Jooss used mask to free dancers of identity. The masks make the dancers look otherworldly, but erases class and individuality at the same time, helping to convey the idea that death does not differentiate or pick his victims.
