= Cynthia Damon =

Professor of Classical Studies

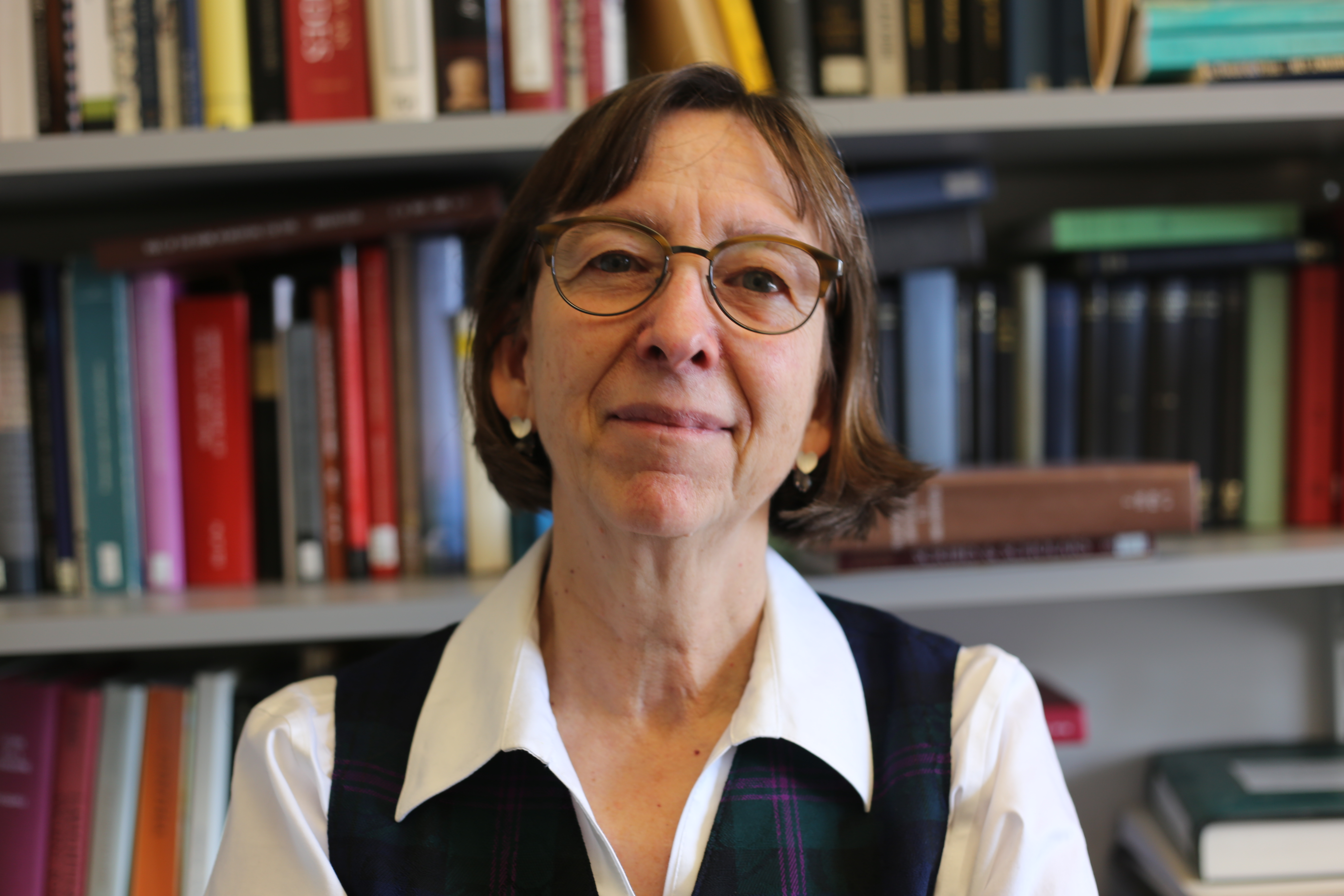
- Cynthia Damon, Professor of Classical Studies, University of Pennsylvania
- Born: 1957 (age 68–69)
- Known for: Translation of and commentary on classical texts
- Board member of: American Philological Association (2007-2010)

Academic background
- Education: Stanford University
- Thesis: Vetus atque antiquus quaestus: The Art of the Parasite in Ancient Rome
- Doctoral advisor: Edward Courtney, Susan Treggiari, Elaine Fantham

Academic work
- Discipline: Classical Studies
- Sub-discipline: Latin literature, historiography
- Institutions: Harvard University; Amherst College; University of Pennsylvania

Cynthia Ellen Murray Damon (born 1957) is a Professor of Classical Studies at the University of Pennsylvania and has written extensively on Latin literature and Roman historiography, having published translations and commentaries on authors such as Caesar and Tacitus.

== Career ==
Cynthia Damon received her B.A. in History from Stanford University in 1979, M.A. in Classics from Boston College in 1984 and Ph.D. from Stanford University in 1990, as well as an honorary A.M. from Amherst College in 2004.

Damon taught at Harvard University as Assistant Professor from 1990 to 1995, at Amherst College as Assistant Professor and Professor 1995-2007, and moved to the University of Pennsylvania as Professor of Classical Studies in 2007. In 2015 Damon was awarded the College of Liberal and Professional Studies Distinguished Teaching Award for Standing Faculty.

Damon was the editor of Transactions of the American Philological Association from 2001 to 2005 and member of the board of directors of the American Philological Association from 2007 to 2010. Damon is part of Bryn Mawr Classical Review's editorial board.

In 1997 Damon published The Mask of the Parasite: A Pathology of Roman Patronage based on her doctoral thesis. Since 1997 Damon has focused on the translation of and commentaries on key classical texts including works by Augustus, Nepos, Tacitus, and Caesar. Damon was awarded a Loeb Classical Library Foundation Fellowship in 2013/14 to work on a new translation of Caesar's Civil War, which was published in 2016 replacing the 1914 version by A. G. Peskett. She is currently focusing on Pliny's Natural History and its reception and delivered a keynote address Plinian layers: On editing the reception of Pliny’s planetary theory in 2016 at the conference The Arts of Editing: Past, Present and Future (17–19 August 2016) at Stockholm University.

Damon has been praised for her meticulous approach to texts. For example, Antonio Moreno Hernández commented on Studies on the Text of Caesar's Bellum civile:

This excellent edition makes serious contributions to the reconstruction of the text, and its careful and deep reading of the text of BC and the close study of its textural tradition is accompanied by an insightful commentary on troublesome passages that brings to light the enormous complexity of a text that has been transmitted in such a deficient way, offering suggestive new proposals that will encourage reflection on the reading and interpretation of the work of Caesar.

In 2016/17 Damon was awarded the Andrew W. Mellon Fellowship in the Price Lab for Digital Humanities to work on the Bellum Alexandrinum project. This project is a pilot to test the new Digital Latin Library editing platform and has included input from high school to graduate students to serve as a precedent for collaborative editions of classical texts and an example of how one might include text editing in classicists' training.

== Selected works ==
- Caesar, Civil War (edition and translation, Loeb Classical Library, 2016) ISBN 9780674997035
- C. Iuli Caesaris Commentariorum libri III de bello civili (Oxford Classical Texts, 2015). ISBN 9780199659746
- Studies on the Text of Caesar's Bellum Civile (Oxford, 2015) ISBN 9780198724063
- Tacitus, Annals (Penguin Classics, 2012) ISBN 9780140455649
- with Brian Breed and Andreola Rossi Citizens of Discord: Rome and its Civil Wars (Oxford University Press, 2010) ISBN 9780195389579
- with William Batstone Caesar's Civil War (Oxford Approaches to Classical Literature, 2006) ISBN 9780195165104
- Tacitus, Histories, Book I (Cambridge Greek and Latin Classics, 2003) ISBN 9780521578226
- The Mask of the Parasite: A Pathology of Roman Patronage (University of Michigan Press, 1997) ISBN 9780472107605
