= Tsifteteli =

Rhythm and dance of Anatolia and the Balkans

Tsifteteli (Greek: τσιφτετέλι) or Çiftetelli, is a rhythm and belly dance of Anatolia and the Balkans (particularly Greece). In Turkish the word means "double stringed", taken from the violin playing style that is practiced in this kind of music. There are suggestions that the dance existed in ancient Greece, known as the Aristophanic dance Cordax. It became popular in Greece through the Greek-Turkish population exchange of 1923, establishing itself as the most popular and most common Greek dance together with Zeibekiko. Nowadays it is found not only in Greece and Turkey, but also in the entirety of the Southeastern Mediterranean region.

The characteristic rhythm is in 8/4 time, arranged as either 3/3/2 eighth-notes followed by 2/2/2/xx (the last beat being silent), or sometimes the first measure is played as 2/2/x1/1x. See for an example of the latter. It is primarily performed by women.

== See also ==
- Music of Greece
- Music of Turkey
- Music of Cyprus
- Music of Southeastern Europe
- Belly dance
