= Margaret Hubbard =

British classical philologist (1924–2011)

- Born: 16 July 1924
- Died: 28 April 2011 (aged 86)

Academic background
- Education: University of Adelaide; Somerville College, Oxford

Academic work
- Discipline: Classical studies
- Institutions: Sommerville College, Oxford; St Anne's College, Oxford

Margaret Hubbard (16 June 1924 – 28 April 2011) was an Australian-born British classical scholar specialising in philology.

== Career ==
Hubbard excelled during her school career at Adelaide High School, which she attended on receipt of a Government bursary won in 1938. Upon graduating from high school she won the Tennyson medal for the top place in the leaving examinations, and Annie Montgomerie Martin prize for coming top in modern history. She then studied for an undergraduate degree at the University of Adelaide, reading Latin, English and Greek there,. She was then awarded a scholarship to attend Somerville College, Oxford in 1948 to study Classics, the first time this scholarship had been awarded to an overseas applicant without an interview. Hubbard graduated in 1953 with a First Class Degree. In 1949 she won the Dorothy McCalman Scholarship, bequeathed by Winifred Holtby, and in 1950 was awarded the Hertford Scholarship and Craven Scholarship. She was the first woman to win the Hertford Scholarship. The following year, she won the Ireland Scholarship, which has been described as "the most distinguished Classical award open to members of [Oxford] University." She followed this with two further awards, the Craven Fellowship and the Passmore Edwards Scholarship.

She worked for a brief period at the Thesaurus Linguae Latinae in Munich, before becoming Mary Somerville Research Fellow at Somerville College from 1955 to 1957. In 1957 she moved to St Anne's College as a tutor, a post she held for the remainder of her career. From 1957 to 1986, she was a tutor and Fellow of St Anne's College, Oxford, making her one of St Anne's College's 15 founding fellows. The noted novelist and philosopher Iris Murdoch was also among this group, and dedicated her 1962 novel An Unofficial Rose to Hubbard. It was the potential public scandal of an affair between Murdoch and Hubbard which caused Murdoch to resign her own fellowship at St Annes in 1962. Hubbard served as University Assessor in 1964–5.

She spent her retirement travelling, cooking, reading, and doing jigsaws with her "adored companion" and partner Gwynneth Matthews, who had been a tutor in Ancient Philosophy at St Anne's, and with whom she had lived since at least the 1960s. In 2007 she was elected to an honorary fellowship at St Anne's, and the following year a one-day conference was held to commemorate Hubbard's work. In her will she gave money to fund the college's Fellowship in Classical Languages and Literature, named after her father, A.E. Hubbard. She died in 2011. Hubbard has been described as "one of the most distinguished classical scholars of the modern age".

== Scholarship ==
Hubbard worked primarily on Latin literature. Her major works include a "monumentally authoritative" commentary on Horace in two volumes (1970 and 1978), produced with Robin Nisbet, described as "models of lucidity and of learning." She also wrote a study of Propertius (1974), who she declared to be the "author she loved best". Her other work included articles on Virgil, Horace, and Propertius. Eduard Fraenkel when asked to write about her suitability for the post as a tutor of Classics commented (quoted in her obituary), "When asked to say something about Margaret, I must face the risk of being charged with indulging in superlatives. She is really extraordinary."

== Selected works ==
- Nisbet, R. G. M.; Hubbard, Margaret (1970). A commentary on Horace: Odes, Book I. Oxford: Clarendon Press. ISBN 978-0198144397.
- Hubbard, Margaret (1975). Propertius. Classical Life and Letters. New York: Charles Scribner's Sons. ISBN 0684144646.
- Nisbet, R. G. M.; Hubbard, Margaret (1978). A commentary on Horace: Odes, Book 2. Oxford: Clarendon Press. ISBN 978-0198144526.
