= Conington Prize =

The Conington Prize is awarded annually by the University of Oxford. The cash prize is offered for a dissertation on a subject chosen by the writer and approved by the Board of the Faculty of Classics.

The subject offered cycles through these fields:

- Ancient history, religion, art, and archaeology.
- Ancient philosophy and ideas.
- Classical literature, textual criticism, and philology.

The prize is open to all members of the university and the dissertation may be written in English or Latin. It is named after the English classical scholar John Conington.

== Sources ==
- "Oxford University Gazette". ox.ac.uk. University of Oxford. Archived from the original on 21 March 2018.
