= John Conington =

British classical scholar (1825–1869)

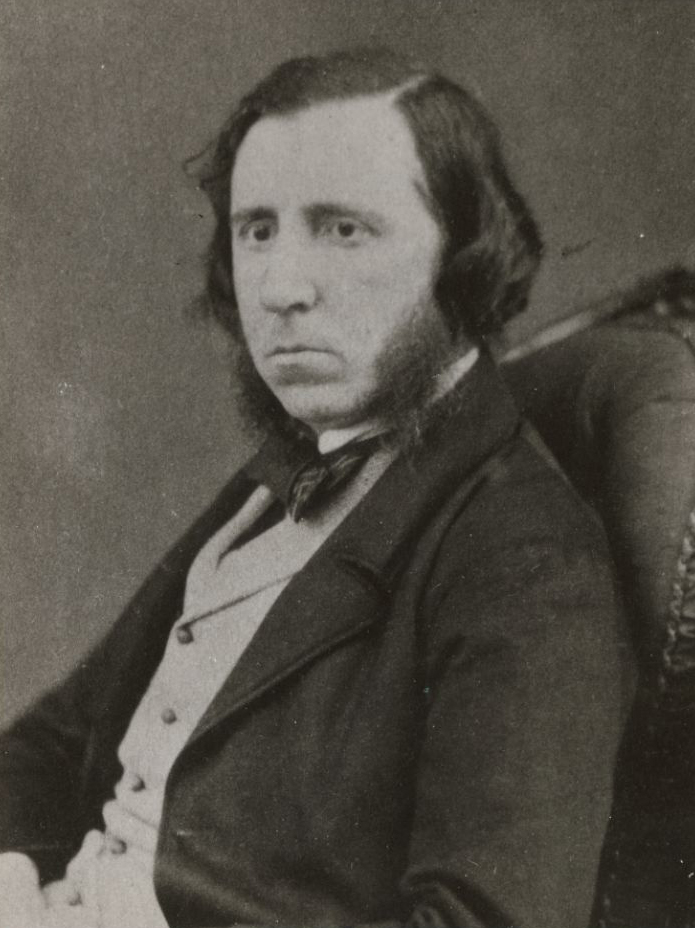
- Born: 10 August 1825
- Died: 23 October 1869 (aged 44); Boston, Lincolnshire, England
- Title: Corpus Christi Professor of Latin (1854–1869)

Academic background
- Education: University College, Oxford; Magdalen College, Oxford

Academic work
- Discipline: Classical scholar
- Sub-discipline: Latin literature; ancient Greek literature; commentary; Persius; Horace; Virgil; Homer; Aeschylus
- Institutions: University College, Oxford; Corpus Christi College, Oxford

John Conington (10 August 1825 – 23 October 1869) was an English classical scholar. In 1866 he published his best-known work, the translation of the Aeneid of Virgil into the octosyllabic metre of Walter Scott. He was Corpus Professor of Latin at the University of Oxford from 1854 until his death.

== Early life and education ==
Conington was born on 10 August 1825 in Boston, Lincolnshire, England, to the Revd Richard Conington and Jane (née Thirkhill). He is said to have learned the alphabet at fourteen months, and to have been reading well at three and a half. He was educated at Beverley Grammar School, an all-boys grammar school in Beverley, Yorkshire, and at Rugby School, an all-boys independent boarding school in Rugby, Warwickshire.

On 30 June 1843, Conington matriculated at University College, Oxford, to study literae humaniores. However, he was soon awarded a demyship at Magdalen College, Oxford, and so moved college. He won the Ireland and Hertford scholarships in 1844. He was active in the Oxford Union, becoming secretary in 1845, president in 1846, and librarian in 1847. In December 1846, he graduated with a first class honours Bachelor of Arts (BA) degree. He decided against taking Holy Orders, and was thus restricted to applying for lay fellowships. Having been awarded a scholarship at University College in March 1846, he continued his studies after taking his degree and was awarded multiple Chancellor's prizes for his work: for Latin verse (1847), for an English essay (1848), and for a Latin essay (1849).

== Career ==
In February 1848, Conington was elected a fellow of University College, Oxford. He also obtained the Chancellor's prizes for Latin verse (1847), English essay (1848) and Latin essay (1849). He successfully applied for the Eldon Law Scholarship in 1849, and went to Lincoln's Inn; but after six months he resigned the scholarship and returned to Oxford.

During his brief residence in London he began writing for the Morning Chronicle, and continued to do so after leaving. He showed no special aptitude for journalism, but a series of articles on university reform (1849–1850) was the first public expression of his views on a subject that always interested him.

In 1852, Conington was an unsuccessful candidate for the Professorship of Greek at the University of Edinburgh. In 1854, he was elected the first Corpus Christi Professor of Latin, based at Corpus Christi College, Oxford. From this time he confined himself with characteristic conscientiousness almost exclusively to Latin literature. The only important exception was the translation of the last twelve books of the Iliad in the Spenserian stanza in completion of the work of P.S. Worsley, and this was undertaken in fulfilment of a promise made to his dying friend.

=== Works ===
Conington's edition of Persius, with commentary and a prose translation was published posthumously in 1872. In the same year appeared his Miscellaneous Writings, edited by John Addington Symonds, with a memoir by Henry John Stephen Smith (see also Hugh Andrew Johnstone Munro in Journal of Philology, ii., 1869).

In 1852 Conington began, in conjunction with Goldwin Smith, a complete edition of Virgil with a commentary, of which the first volume appeared in 1858, the second in 1864, and the third soon after his death. Goldwin Smith was compelled to withdraw from the work at an early stage, and in the last volume his place was taken by Henry Nettleship.

Conington's other editions are:

- Aeschylus, Agamemmon (1848), Choëphori (1857);
- English verse translations of Horace, Odes and Carmen Saeculare (1863), Satires, Epistles and Ars Poëtica (1869).

== Views ==
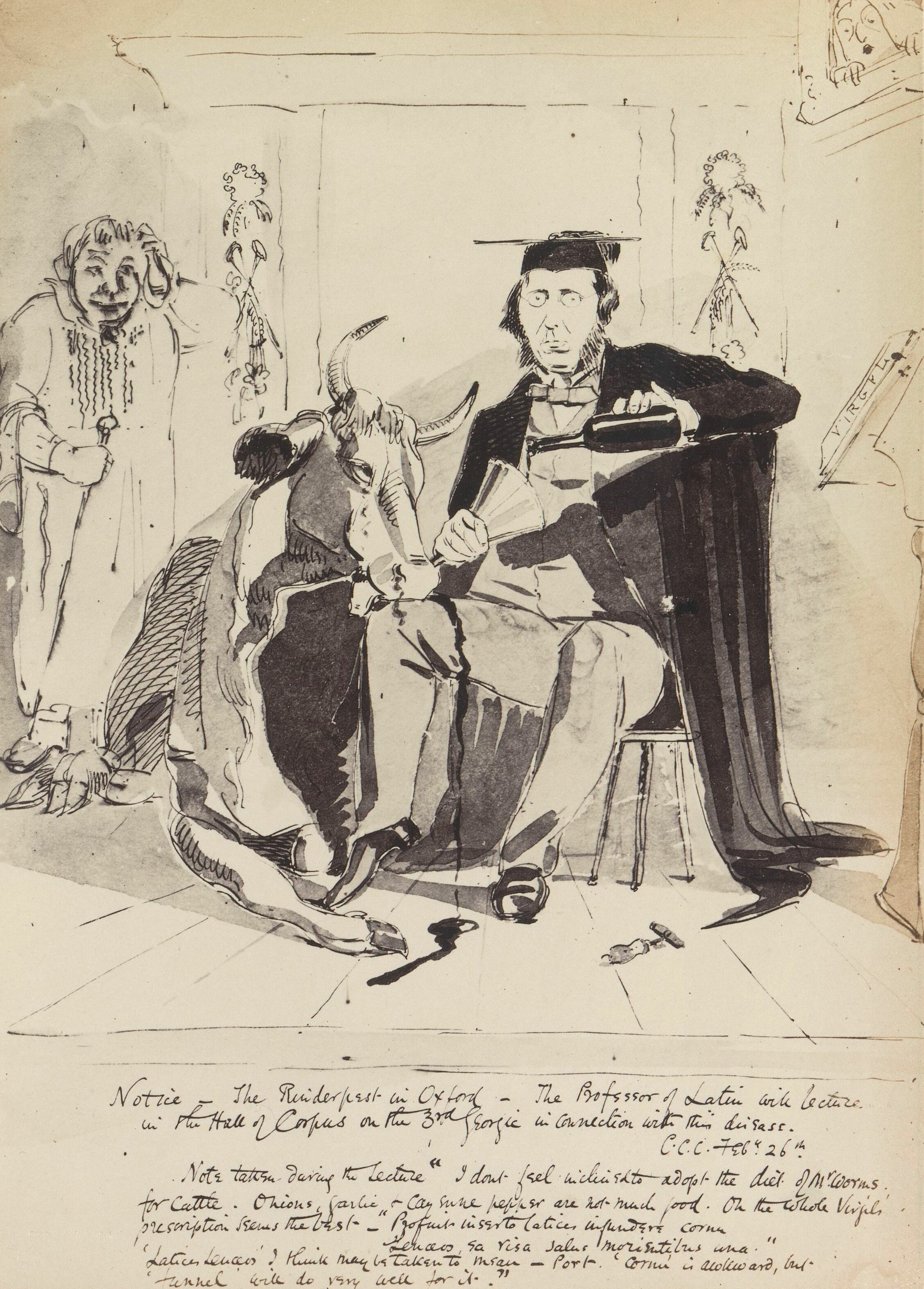
Caricature of Prof Conington's view on the rinderpest in Oxford

Known to be sympathetic to Radical political causes such as Chartism, Conington also loved intense scholarly conversation, often inviting favoured undergraduates to accompany him on his regular 2pm walks. One such was the future Idealist philosopher, T. H. Green. J. A. Symonds was another student friend of Conington's and he and Green accompanied Conington on several of his summer reading parties during the Long Vacation. Henry Nettleship described the selection procedure:

First came the invitation to breakfast; then if the undergraduate pleased him, an invitation to walk: then more breakfasts and more walks: then, if the young man had survived this ordeal … perhaps an invitation to join a reading party in the Long [Vacation]. The final stage of intimacy was the fixing of a particular day in the week to walk with a particular man. To this last both Green and I at length attained, Green’s day being Monday and mine Wednesday.

— The Politics of Conscience

In 1854, he had a personal and spiritual crisis. He began to attend chapel assiduously, only read religious books on Sundays, and to espouse conservative political views. He also became a follower of Edward Bouverie Pusey, one of the leaders of the Anglo-Catholic Oxford Movement.

== Personal life ==
Conington never married nor had any children.

On 23 October 1869, Conington died in Boston, Lincolnshire, following an illness caused by "a malignant pustule on the lip". He was aged 44. He was buried at Fishtoft, Lincolnshire.

The Conington Prize, an award for the best dissertation by an undergraduate in the Faculty of Classics, University of Oxford, was named in his honour.

== See also ==
- English translations of Homer § Conington
