= Cambridge Companions =

Book series

The Cambridge Companions series of Cambridge University Press "are a series of authoritative guides" written by academic scholars on topics and periods related to Literature and Classics, Music, and Philosophy, Religion and Culture.

They are similar in some ways to the Routledge Companions published by Routledge and the Oxford Handbooks published by Oxford University Press.

== Volumes ==
- List of Cambridge Companions to Literature and Classics
- List of Cambridge Companions to Music
- List of Cambridge Companions to Philosophy, Religion and Culture
