= Derek Hirst =

Derek Hirst (born 1948, Isle of Wight) is an English historian of early modern Britain.

A Fellow of the Royal Historical Society and author of five books and over thirty articles, Hirst held a B.A. (1969) and Ph.D. (1974) from Cambridge University. He was the William Eliot Smith Professor of History at Washington University in St. Louis, where he taught from 1975 to 2017, supervising seventeen dissertations and serving as chair of the department for several years. His focus was on 17th-century England and his best known work is England In Conflict 1603-1660: Kingdom, Community, Commonwealth. His other academic books included Representative of the People? Voters and Voting in England under the Early Stuarts (Cambridge UP, 1975), Authority and Conflict: England 1603-1658 (Oxford UP, 1986), and Dominion: England and its island neighbours, 1500-1707 (Oxford UP, 2012). In addition, he published over 80 scholarly articles and reviews Soon after his retirement from Washington University in St. Louis, an endowed chair of history in the College of Arts and Sciences was established in his honor at the university (2022). The chair was inaugurated by another well-published historian of early modern England, Steve Hindle.

Hirst also worked extensively on Andrew Marvell with Steven Zwicker, a colleague at Washington University in St. Louis. Hirst and Zwicker conducted an extensive review of Marvell's work and were the first to suggest that Marvell's campaigns for the rights of the individual were the result of "an inner struggle that tugged at every fiber of his personal life." Their work has led them to be considered among the leading experts on Marvell and their findings appeared in book form in Andrew Marvell, Orphan of the Hurricane (2012).
