= Cordax =

Ancient Greek dance

The cordax (Ancient Greek: κόρδαξ), was a provocative, licentious, and often obscene mask dance of ancient Greek comedy. In his play The Clouds, Aristophanes complains that other playwrights of his time try to hide the feebleness of their plays by bringing an old woman onto the stage to dance the cordax. He notes with pride that his patrons will not find such gimmicks in his plays.

Petronius Arbiter in his Roman novel the Satyricon has Trimalchio boast to his dinner guests that no one dances the cordax better than his wife, Fortunata. The nature of this dance is described in the satires of Juvenal, who says "the girls encouraged by applause sink to the ground with tremulous buttocks." [Satire XI] The poet Horace and playwright Plautus refer to the same dance as ionici motus.

Juvenal makes specific mention of the testarum crepitus (clicking of castanets). In the earlier Greek form, finger cymbals were used.

It is theorized by some that this dance constitutes the ancient predecessor of belly dance and specifically, of the Greek version named "Tsifteteli".

== General references ==
- "Cordax" at the Dictionary of Classical Antiquities
- "Dancing Girls" at the Internet Sacred Text Archive
