= List of Cambridge Companions to Philosophy, Religion and Culture =

The Cambridge Companions to Philosophy, Religion and Culture form a book series published by Cambridge University Press. Each book is a collection of essays on the topic commissioned by the publisher. As of April 2026, there are 285 books in this series.

== Volumes (sortable table) ==
The Cambridge Companion...
to...	Subseries	Contributors, sortable by editor(s)	Publ.	ISBN	Ref.
Abelard	Philosophy	Jeffrey E. Brower, Kevin Guilfoy	2004		
Abraham Lincoln	Culture	Shirley Samuels	2012		
Adam Smith	Philosophy	Knud Haakonssen	2006		
Adorno	Philosophy	Tom Huhn	2004		
American Catholicism	Religion	Margaret M. McGuinness, Thomas F. Rzeznik	2021		
American Islam	Religion	Juliane Hammer, Omid Safi	2013		
American Judaism	Religion	Dana Evan Kaplan	2005		
American Methodism	Religion	Jason E. Vickers	2013		
American Protestantism	Religion	Jason E. Vickers, Jennifer Woodruff Tait	2022		
Ancient Ethics	Philosophy	Christopher Bobonich	2017		
Ancient Greek and Roman Science	Culture	Liba Taub	2020		
Ancient Greek Political Thought	Philosophy	Stephen Salkever	2009		
Ancient Logic	Philosophy	Luca Castagnoli, Paolo Fait	2023		
Ancient Mediterranean Religions	Religion	Barbette Stanley Spaeth	2013		
Ancient Scepticism	Philosophy	Richard Bett	2010		
Anselm	Religion	Brian Davies, Brian Leftow	2004		
Antisemitism	Religion	Steven Katz	2022		
Apocalyptic Literature	Culture	Colin McAllister	2020		
Aquinas	Religion	Norman Kretzmann, Eleonore Stump	1993		
Arabic Philosophy	Philosophy	Peter Adamson, Richard C. Taylor	2004		
Aristotle's Biology	Philosophy	Sophia M. Connell	2021		
Aristotle's Nicomachean Ethics	Philosophy	Ronald Polansky	2014		
Aristotle's Politics	Philosophy	Marguerite Deslauriers, Pierre Destrée	2013		
Atheism	Religion	Michael Martin	2006		
Augustine	Religion	Eleonore Stump, Norman Kretzmann	2001		
Augustine (2nd Edition)	Religion	David Vincent Meconi, Eleonore Stump	2014		
Augustine's City of God	Religion	Fr. David Vincent Meconi, S.J.	2021		
Augustine's 'Confessions'	Religion	Tarmo Toom	2020		
Augustine's Sermons	Religion	Andrew Hofer, OP	2025		
Bacon	Philosophy	Markku Peltonen	1996		
Baseball	Culture	Leonard Cassuto, Stephen Partridge	2011		
Benjamin Franklin	Philosophy	Carla Mulford	2009		
Berkeley	Philosophy	Kenneth P. Winkler	2005		
Bertrand Russell	Philosophy	Nicholas Griffin	2003		
Biblical Interpretation	Religion	John Barton	1998		
Biblical Narrative	Religion	Keith Bodner	2025		
Biblical Wisdom Literature	Religion	Katherine J. Dell, Suzanna R. Millar, Arthur Jan Keefer	2022		
Black Theology	Religion	Dwight N. Hopkins, Edward P. Antonio	2012		
Bob Dylan	Culture	Kevin J. H. Dettmar	2009		
Boethius	Philosophy	John Marenbon	2009		
Boxing	Culture	Gerald Early	2019		
Brentano	Philosophy	Dale Jacquette	2004		
C. S. Lewis	Religion	Robert MacSwain, Michael Ward	2010		
Carnap	Philosophy	Michael Friedman, Richard Creath	2007		
Chomsky	Philosophy	James McGilvray	2005		
Chomsky (2nd Edition)	Philosophy	James McGilvray	2017		
Christian Doctrine	Religion	Colin E. Gunton	1997		
Christian Ethics	Religion	Robin Gill	2000		
Christian Ethics (2nd Edition)	Religion	Robin Gill	2011		
Christian Heresy	Religion	Richard Flower	2025		
Christian Liturgy	Religion	Joris Geldhof	2025		
Christian Mysticism	Religion	Amy Hollywood, Patricia Z. Beckman	2012		
Christian Philosophical Theology	Religion	Charles Taliaferro, Chad Meister	2009		
Christianity and the Environment	Religion	Alexander J. B. Hampton, Douglas Hedley	2022		
Christology	Religion	Timothy J. Pawl, Michael L. Peterson	2025		
Cicero's Philosophy	Philosophy	Jed W. Atkins, Thomas Bénatouïl	2021		
Civil Disobedience	Culture	William E. Scheuerman	2021		
Classical Islamic Theology	Religion	Tim Winter	2008		
Common-Sense Philosophy	Philosophy	Rik Peels, René van Woudenberg	2020		
Constant	Philosophy	Helena Rosenblatt	2009		
Constantinople	Culture	Sarah Bassett	2022		
Counter-Reformation Sanctity	Religion	Jan Machielsen, Emily Michelson, Katrina B. Olds	2026		
Cricket	Culture	Anthony Bateman, Jeffrey Hill	2011		
Critical Theory	Philosophy	Fred Rush	2004		
Darwin	Philosophy	Jonathan Hodge, Gregory Radick	2003		
Darwin (2nd Edition)	Philosophy	Jonathan Hodge, Gregory Radick	2009		
Deleuze	Philosophy	Daniel W. Smith, Henry Somers-Hall	2012		
Descartes	Philosophy	John Cottingham	1992		
Descartes' Meditations	Philosophy	David Cunning	2014		
Dewey	Culture	Molly Cochran	2010		
Dietrich Bonhoeffer	Religion	John W. de Gruchy	1999		
Duns Scotus	Religion	Thomas Williams	2002		
Durkheim	Philosophy	Jeffrey C. Alexander, Philip Smith	2005		
Early Christian Theology	Religion	David E. Wilhite	2026		
Early Greek Philosophy	Philosophy	A. A. Long	1999		
Early Modern Philosophy	Philosophy	Donald Rutherford	2006		
Einstein	Culture	Michel Janssen, Christoph Lehner	2014		
Epicureanism	Philosophy	James Warren	2009		
Evangelical Theology	Religion	Timothy Larsen, Daniel J. Treier	2007		
Existentialism	Philosophy	Steven Crowell	2012		
Feminism in Philosophy	Philosophy	Miranda Fricker, Jennifer Hornsby	2000		
Feminist Theology	Religion	Susan Frank Parsons	2002		
Fichte	Philosophy	David James, Günter Zöller	2016		
Football	Culture	Rob Steen, Jed Novick, Huw Richards	2013		
Foucault	Philosophy	Gary Gutting	1994		
Foucault (2nd Edition)	Philosophy	Gary Gutting	2005		
Francis of Assisi	Religion	Michael J. P. Robson	2011		
Frege	Philosophy	Tom Ricketts, Michael Potter	2010		
Freud	Philosophy	Jerome Neu	1991		
Friedrich Schleiermacher	Religion	Jacqueline Mariña	2005		
Gadamer	Philosophy	Robert J. Dostal	2002		
Gadamer (2nd Edition)	Philosophy	Robert Dostal	2021		
Galen	Philosophy	R. J. Hankinson	2008		
Galileo	Culture	Peter Machamer	1998		
Gandhi	Culture	Judith Brown, Anthony Parel	2011		
Genesis	Religion	Bill T. Arnold	2022		
German Idealism	Philosophy	Karl Ameriks	2000		
German Idealism (2nd Edition)	Philosophy	Karl Ameriks	2017		
Habermas	Philosophy	Stephen K. White	1995		
Hannah Arendt	Philosophy	Dana Villa	2000		
Hans Urs von Balthasar	Religion	Edward T. Oakes, S.J., David Moss	2004		
Hayek	Philosophy	Edward Feser	2006		
Hegel	Philosophy	Frederick C. Beiser	1993		
Hegel and Nineteenth- Century Philosophy	Philosophy	Frederick C. Beiser	2008		
Heidegger	Philosophy	Charles Guignon	1993		
Heidegger (2nd Edition)	Philosophy	Charles Guignon	2006		
Heidegger's Being and Time	Philosophy	Mark A. Wrathall	2013		
Hermeneutics	Philosophy	Michael N. Forster, Kristin Gjesdal	2019		
Hippocrates	Philosophy	Peter E. Pormann	2018		
Hobbes	Philosophy	Tom Sorell	1996		
Hobbes's Leviathan	Philosophy	Patricia Springborg	2007		
Horseracing	Culture	Rebecca Cassidy	2013		
Hume	Philosophy	David Fate Norton	1993		
Hume (2nd Edition)	Philosophy	David Fate Norton, Jacqueline Taylor	2008		
Hume's Treatise	Philosophy	Donald C. Ainslie, Annemarie Butler	2015		
Husserl	Philosophy	Barry Smith, David Woodruff Smith	1995		
Isaiah Berlin	Philosophy	Joshua L. Cherniss, Steven B. Smith	2018		
Jesus	Religion	Markus Bockmuehl	2001		
Jewish Theology	Religion	Steven Kepnes	2020		
John Calvin	Religion	Donald K. McKim	2004		
John Henry Newman	Religion	Ian Ker, Terrence Merrigan	2009		
John Wesley	Religion	Randy L. Maddox, Jason E. Vickers	2009		
Jonathan Edwards	Religion	Stephen J. Stein	2006		
Joseph Ratzinger	Religion	Daniel Cardó, Uwe Michael Lang	2023		
Judaism and Law	Religion	Christine Hayes	2017		
Jung	Culture	Polly Young-Eisendrath, Terence Dawson	1997		
Jung (2nd Edition)	Culture	Polly Young-Eisendrath, Terrence Dawson	2008		
Kant	Philosophy	Paul Guyer	1992		
Kant and Modern Philosophy	Philosophy	Paul Guyer	2006		
Kant's Critique of Pure Reason	Philosophy	Paul Guyer	2010		
Karl Barth	Religion	John Webster	2000		
Karl Rahner	Religion	Declan Marmion, Mary E. Hines	2005		
Keynes	Philosophy	Roger E. Backhouse, Bradley W. Bateman	2006		
Kierkegaard	Philosophy	Alastair Hannay, Gordon Daniel Marino	1997		
Late Medieval English Kingship	Culture	Gwilym Dodd	2025		
Latin American Independence	Culture	Marcela Echeverri, Cristina Soriano	2023		
Law in the Hebrew Bible	Religion	Bruce Wells	2024		
Leibniz	Philosophy	Nicholas Jolley	1994		
Leo Strauss	Philosophy	Steven B. Smith	2009		
Levinas	Philosophy	Simon Critchley, Robert Bernasconi	2002		
Lévi-Strauss	Philosophy	Boris Wiseman	2009		
Liberalism	Philosophy	Steven Wall	2015		
Liberation Theology	Religion	Christopher Rowland	1999		
Liberation Theology (2nd Edition)	Religion	Christopher Rowland	2007		
Life and Death	Philosophy	Steven Luper	2014		
Locke	Philosophy	Vere Chappell	1994		
Locke's 'Essay Concerning Human Understanding'	Philosophy	Lex Newman	2007		
Logical Empiricism	Philosophy	Alan Richardson, Thomas Uebel	2007		
Maimonides	Philosophy	Kenneth Seeskin	2005		
Malcom X	Culture	Robert E. Terrill	2010		
Malebranche	Philosophy	Steven Nadler	2000		
Marcus Aurelius' Meditations	Philosophy	John Sellars	2025		
Martin Luther	Religion	Donald K. McKim	2003		
Marx	Philosophy	Terrell Carver	1991		
Matthew Paris	Religion	James G. Clark	2026		
Medieval English Culture	Culture	Andrew Galloway	2011		
Medieval English Mysticism	Culture	Samuel Fanous, Vincent Gillespie	2011		
Medieval Ethics	Philosophy	Thomas Williams	2018		
Medieval Jewish Philosophy	Philosophy	Daniel H. Frank, Oliver Leaman	2003		
Medieval Logic	Philosophy	Catarina Dutilh Novaes, Stephen Read	2016		
Medieval Philosophy	Philosophy	A. S. McGrade	2003		
Medievalism	Culture	Louise D'Arcens	2016		
Merleau-Ponty	Philosophy	Taylor Carman, Mark B. N. Hansen	2004		
Mill	Philosophy	John Skorupski	1998		
Miracles	Religion	Graham H. Twelftree	2011		
Modern American Culture	Culture	Christopher Bigsby	2006		
Modern Arab Culture	Culture	Dwight F. Reynolds	2015		
Modern British Culture	Culture	Michael Higgins, Clarissa Smith, John Storey	2010		
Modern Chinese Culture	Culture	Kam Louie	2008		
Modern French Culture	Culture	Nicholas Hewitt	2003		
Modern German Culture	Culture	Eva Kolinsky, Wilfried van der Will	1999		
Modern Indian Culture	Culture	Vasudha Dalmia, Rashmi Sadana	2012		
Modern Irish Culture	Culture	Joe Cleary, Claire Connolly	2005		
Modern Italian Culture	Culture	Zygmunt G. Baranski, Rebecca J. West	2001		
Modern Japanese Culture	Culture	Yoshio Sugimoto	2009		
Modern Jewish Philosophy	Philosophy	Michael L. Morgan, Peter Eli Gordon	2007		
Modern Latin American Culture	Culture	John King	2004		
Modern Russian Culture	Culture	Nicholas Rzhevsky	1999		
Modern Russian Culture (2nd Edition)	Culture	Nicholas Rzhevsky	2012		
Modern Spanish Culture	Culture	David T. Gies	1999		
Montaigne	Philosophy	Ullrich Langer	2005		
Muhammad	Religion	Jonathan E. Brockopp	2010		
Natural Law Ethics	Philosophy	Tom Angier	2019		
Nelson Mandela	Culture	Rita Barnard	2014		
New Religious Movements	Religion	Olav Hammer, Mikael Rothstein	2012		
Newton	Culture	I. Bernard Cohen, George E. Smith	2002		
Newton (2nd Edition)	Culture	Rob Iliffe, George E. Smith	2016		
Nietzsche	Philosophy	Bernd Magnus, Kathleen Higgins	1996		
Nozick's Anarchy, State, and Utopia	Philosophy	Ralf M. Bader, John Meadowcroft	2011		
Oakeshott	Philosophy	Efraim Podoksik	2012		
Ockham	Philosophy	Paul Vincent Spade	1999		
Orthodox Christian Theology	Religion	Mary B. Cunningham	2008		
Ottoman History	Culture	Alexis Wick	2025		
Pascal	Philosophy	Nicholas Hammond	2003		
Paul Tillich	Philosophy	Russell Re Manning	2009		
Peirce	Philosophy	Cheryl Misak	2004		
Pentecostalism	Religion	Cecil M. Robeck, Jr, Amos Yong	2014		
Philo	Religion	Adam Kamesar	2009		
Philosophical Methodology	Philosophy	Giuseppina D'Oro, Søren Overgaard	2017		
Piaget	Philosophy	Ulrich Müller, Jeremy I. M. Carpendale, Leslie Smith	2009		
Plato	Philosophy	Richard Kraut	1992		
Plato (2nd Edition)	Philosophy	David Ebrey, Richard Kraut	2022		
Plato's Republic	Philosophy	G. R. F. Ferrari	2007		
Plotinus	Philosophy	Lloyd P. Gerson	1996		
Popper	Philosophy	Jeremy Shearmur, Geoffrey Stokes	2016		
Postmodern Theology	Religion	Kevin J. Vanhoozer	2003		
Pragmatism	Philosophy	Alan Malachowski	2013		
Puritanism	Religion	John Coffey, Paul C. H. Lim	2008		
Quakerism	Religion	Stephen W. Angell, Pink Dandelion	2018		
Quine	Philosophy	Roger F. Gibson, Jr	2004		
Rawls	Philosophy	Samuel Freeman	2002		
Reformation Theology	Religion	David Bagchi, David C. Steinmetz	2004		
Reformed Theology	Religion	Paul T. Nimmo, David A. S. Fergusson	2016		
Religion and Artificial Intelligence	Religion	Beth Singler, Fraser Watts	2024		
Religion and Terrorism	Religion	James R. Lewis	2017		
Religion and War	Religion	Margo Kitts	2023		
Religious Experience	Religion	Paul K. Moser, Chad Meister	2020		
Religious Studies	Religion	Robert A. Orsi	2011		
Renaissance Philosophy	Philosophy	James Hankins	2007		
Rorty	Philosophy	David Rondel	2021		
Rousseau	Philosophy	Patrick Riley	2001		
Sartre	Philosophy	Christina Howells	1992		
Sayyid Ahmad Khan	Culture	Yasmin Saikia, M. Raisur Rahman	2019		
Schopenhauer	Philosophy	Christopher Janaway	1999		
Science and Religion	Religion	Peter Harrison	2010		
Simone de Beauvoir	Philosophy	Claudia Card	2003		
Socrates	Philosophy	Donald R. Morrison	2010		
Spinoza	Philosophy	Don Garrett	1995		
Spinoza (2nd Edition)	Philosophy	Don Garrett	2021		
Spinoza's Ethics	Philosophy	Olli Koistinen	2009		
St Paul	Religion	James D. G. Dunn	2003		
Sufism	Religion	Lloyd Ridgeon	2014		
Age of William the Conqueror	Culture	Benjamin Pohl	2022		
Apostolic Fathers	Religion	Michael F. Bird, Scott Harrower	2021		
Bible (2nd Edition)	Religion	Bruce Chilton, Howard Clark Kee, Eric M. Meyers, John Rogerson, Amy-Jill Levine, Anthony J. Saldarini	2007		
Bible and Literature	Religion	Calum Carmichael	2020		
Book of Isaiah	Religion	Christopher B. Hays	2024		
Byzantine Church	Religion	Andrew Mellas, Bronwen Neil	2026		
Cistercian Order	Religion	Mette Birkedal Bruun	2012		
The Communist Manifesto	Philosophy	Terrell Carver, James Farr	2015		
Council of Nicaea	Religion	Young Richard Kim	2021		
Council of Trent	Religion	Nelson H. Minnich	2023		
Dutch Golden Age	Culture	Helmer J. Helmers, Geert H. Janssen	2018		
The Federalist	Philosophy	Jack N. Rakove, Colleen A. Sheehan	2020		
Gospels	Religion	Stephen C. Barton	2006		
Gospels (2nd Edition)	Religion	Stephen C. Barton, Todd Brewer	2021		
Greek Iron Age	Culture	Jane B. Carter, Carla M. Antonaccio	2026		
Hebrew Bible and Ethics	Religion	C. L. Crouch	2021		
Hebrew Bible/Old Testament	Religion	Stephen B. Chapman, Marvin A. Sweeney	2016		
Jesuits	Religion	Thomas Worcester	2008		
New Testament	Religion	Patrick Gray	2021		
'Origin of Species'	Culture	Michael Ruse, Robert J. Richards	2008		
Philosophy of Biology	Philosophy	David L. Hull, Michael Ruse	2007		
Problem of Evil	Philosophy	Chad Meister, Paul K. Moser	2017		
Qur'ān	Religion	Jane Dammen McAuliffe	2006		
Scottish Enlightenment	Philosophy	Alexander Broadie	2003		
Scottish Enlightenment (2nd Edition)	Philosophy	Alexander Broadie, Craig Smith	2019		
Sophists	Philosophy	Joshua Billings, Christopher Moore	2023		
Stoics	Philosophy	Brad Inwood	2003		
Summa Theologiae	Philosophy	Philip McCosker, Denys Turner	2016		
Talmud and Rabbinic Literature	Culture	Charlotte Elisheva Fonrobert, Martin S. Jaffee	2007		
Trinity	Religion	Peter C. Phan	2011		
Thomas Jefferson	Philosophy	Frank Shuffelton	2009		
Thomas More	Religion	George M. Logan	2011		
Thomas Reid	Philosophy	Terence Cuneo, René van Woudenberg	2004		
Tocqueville	Philosophy	Cheryl B. Welch	2006		
Utilitarianism	Philosophy	Ben Eggleston, Dale E. Miller	2014		
Vatican II	Religion	Richard R. Gaillardetz	2020		
Victorian Culture	Culture	Francis O'Gorman	2010		
Virtue Ethics	Philosophy	Daniel C. Russell	2013		
Vygotsky	Culture	Harry Daniels, Michael Cole, James V. Wertsch	2007		
W. E. B. Du Bois	Culture	Shamoon Zamir	2008		
Weber	Philosophy	Stephen Turner	2000		
William James	Philosophy	Ruth Anna Putnam	1997		
Winston Churchill	Culture	Allen Packwood	2023		
Wittgenstein	Philosophy	Hans D. Sluga, David G. Stern	1996		
Wittgenstein (2nd Edition)	Philosophy	Hans Sluga, David G. Stern	2017		
Women and Islam	Religion	Masooda Bano	2025		
Aquinas (New)	Religion	Eleonore Stump, Thomas Joseph White	2022		
Biblical Interpretation (New)	Religion	Ian Boxall, Bradley C. Gregory	2022		
Christian Doctrine (New)	Religion	Michael Allen	2022		
Jesus (New)	Religion	Markus Bockmuehl	2024		
Nietzsche (New)	Philosophy	Tom Stern	2019		
Plotinus (New)	Philosophy	Lloyd Gerson, James Wilberding	2022		
St. Paul (New)	Religion	Bruce W. Longenecker	2020		
