= Philip Stanhope Worsley =

English poet

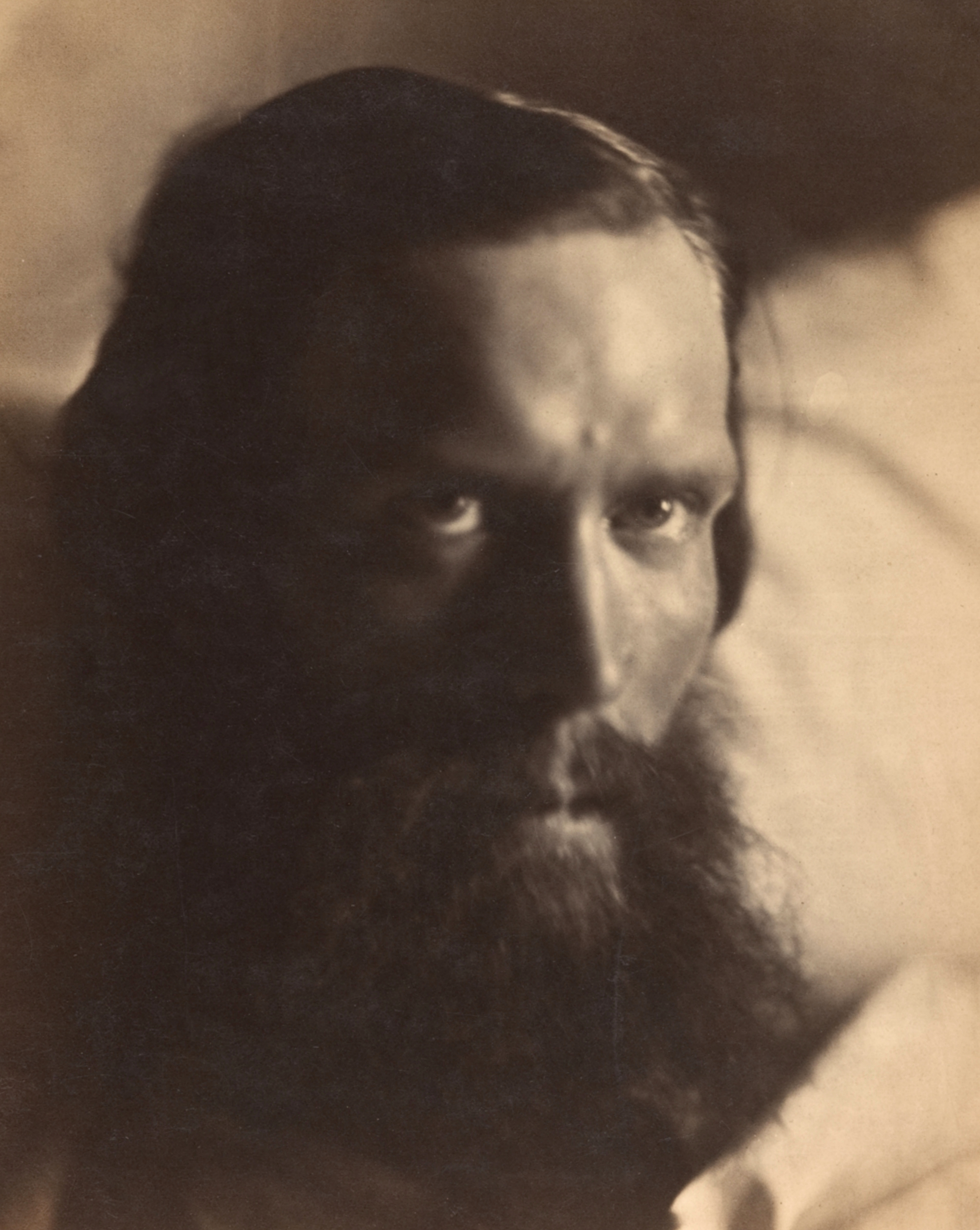
Worsley in 1866 by Julia Margaret Cameron

Philip Stanhope Worsley (12 August 1835 – 8 May 1866) was an English poet.

== Life ==
The son of the Rev. Charles Worsley, he was educated at Highgate School, where he made a lasting impression on Gerard Manley Hopkins, a fellow pupil in his boarding house, and Corpus Christi College, Oxford, where he won the Newdigate prize in 1857 with a poem on The Temple of Janus. In 1861 he published a translation of the Odyssey, followed in 1865 by a translation of the first twelve books of the Iliad, in both of which he employed the Spenserian stanza with success.

In 1863, he published a volume of Poems and Translations.

== Death ==
He died at 30 of tuberculosis.

His unfinished translation of the Iliad was completed after his death by John Conington.
