= Greg Clingham =

British scholar

Greg Clingham (born 9 March 1953) is a British literary scholar and publisher. He was Professor of English (2001–18) at Bucknell University, Pennsylvania, where he held the NEH (National Endowment for the Humanities) Chair in the Humanities (1996–99) and the John P. Crozer Chair of English Literature (2011–16). He was for twenty-three years, the director of Bucknell University Press (1996–2018).

== Life ==
He was born in Cape Town, South Africa and raised and educated in London and at the University of Cambridge. A scholar of St. Catharine's College, Cambridge, Clingham took a First in the English Tripos (1978) and obtained his MA (1982) and his PhD at Clare Hall, Cambridge (1986). After teaching at Tonbridge School, St. Catharine's College, Cambridge and Downing College, Cambridge (1979–86), he moved to the US, teaching at Fordham University (1986–93), New York University (1988, 1991), and Bucknell University (1993–2018).

== Scholarship ==
The student at the University of Cambridge of H.A. Mason, John Newton, Christopher Ricks, Howard Erskine-Hill, J.M.Y. Andrew, and Richard Luckett, Clingham has written widely and authoritatively on the works of Samuel Johnson, James Boswell, John Dryden, Sir George Macartney, and Lady Anne Barnard, and on translation, literary memory, historiography, and orientalism. He is regarded as "a distinguished scholar whose previous work collectively makes for a substantial contribution to our knowledge of Johnson and his age."

== Publishing ==
From 1996 to 2018, Greg Clingham was the director and chief acquiring editor for Bucknell University Press (founded 1968), establishing business partnerships with Rowman & Littlefield (2010–18) and Rutgers University Press (2018-), and publishing 700 scholarly titles in the humanities. Under Clingham's editorship, Bucknell Press became the leading press for eighteenth-century studies (235 titles), and well known for Iberian studies and Latin American studies.

Clingham edited four books series for Bucknell: Bucknell Studies in 18th-Century Literature and Culture (1998–2010), Transits: Literature, Thought & Culture 1660-1860 (2010–18), the Bucknell Review (2002–04), and Aperçus: Histories Texts Cultures (2003–18).

From 1990 to 1996, he was American editor of the journal Translation & Literature; since 2005 he has been on the editorial board of the journal Eighteenth-Century Life; and in 2019 he became the editor of the series, Eighteenth-Century Moments with Clemson University Press.

== Awards and honors ==
Clingham has been awarded fellowships at the William Andrews Clark Memorial Library, Los Angeles; St. Edmund's College, Cambridge; the Beinecke Library, Yale University; Houghton Library, Harvard University; the Noel Memorial Library, Louisiana State University, Shreveport, Louisiana; and the University of St. Andrews, Scotland.

He has been a visiting lecturer in Japan, China, Singapore, Ireland, Turkey, and South Africa and at universities in Great Britain and the United States.

== Books ==
- New Light on Boswell: Critical and Historical Essays on the Occasion of the Bicentenary of The Life of Johnson (Cambridge University Press, 1991), editor
- Boswell: The Life of Johnson (Cambridge University Press, 1992)
- Literary Transmission and Authority: Dryden and Other Authors (Cambridge University Press, 1993), coauthored with Earl Miner, Jennifer Rhodes and David Kramer
- The Cambridge Companion to Samuel Johnson (Cambridge University Press, 1997), editor
- Questioning History: The Postmodern Turn to the Eighteenth Century (Associated University Presses, 1998), editor
- Making History: Textuality and the Forms of Eighteenth-Century Culture (Associated University Presses, 1998), editor
- Johnson, Writing, and Memory (Cambridge University Press, 2002)
- Sustaining Literature: Essays on Literature, History, and Culture, 1500-1800 (Bucknell University Press, 2007), editor
- Samuel Johnson after 300 Years (Cambridge University Press, 2009), co-editor with Philip Smallwood
- Oriental Networks: Commerce and Communication in the Long Eighteenth Century (Bucknell University Press, 2020), co-editor with Baerbel Czennia
