= Michael Winterbottom (academic) =

British classical scholar (born 1934)

Michael Winterbottom FBA
- Born: 22 September 1934 (age 92); Sale
- Occupation: Classical scholar

Academic background
- Education: Dulwich College
- Alma mater: Pembroke College, Oxford, Merton College, Oxford, Christ Church, Oxford

Academic work
- Discipline: Latin literature
- Institutions: University College London (1962–67); Worcester College, Oxford (1967–92); Corpus Christi College, Oxford (1992–2001)

Michael Winterbottom, FBA (born 22 September 1934) is an English classical scholar and author, who was Corpus Christi Professor of Latin at the University of Oxford from 1992 to 2001.

== Biography ==
Michael Winterbottom was educated at Dulwich College, London, and Pembroke College, Oxford. During the Second World War, his family moved from Sale to Torquay, then to Walsall before settling in London.

After National Service in the Royal Signals between 1956 and 1958, he did graduate work at Merton College and then Christ Church, Oxford. After five years as Lecturer in Latin and Greek at University College London (1962–67), he returned to Oxford as Fellow and Tutor in Classics at Worcester College. He moved to Corpus Christi College in 1992 as Corpus Christi Professor of Latin, retiring in 2001.

He has worked mainly on Latin prose texts dating from the Roman Republic to the High Middle Ages.

He was elected a Fellow of the British Academy in 1978.

== Bibliography ==
Complete bibliography is available in Michael Winterbottom, Style and Scholarship: Latin Prose from Gildas to Raffaele Regio (ed. Roberto Gamberini, Firenze, 2020), pp. xxiii–xlvii; see also Michael Winterbottom, Papers on Quintilian and Ancient Declamation (ed. Antonio Stramaglia, Oxford, 2019), pp. xiii–xx.

== Notes and references ==
Academic offices
| Preceded by Robin Nisbet | Corpus Christi Professor of Latin; University of Oxford; 1992 to 2001 | Succeeded by Philip Hardie |
