= John Sandys (classicist) =

English classical scholar (1844–1922)

Sir John Sandys FBA
- Sandys in 1917
- Born: John Edwin Sandys; 19 May 1844; Leicester, England
- Died: 6 July 1922 (aged 78); Cambridge, England
- Occupations: Latin epigrapher; scholar; writer
- Title: Public Orator; orator emeritus
- Spouse: Mary Grainger Hall (m. 1880)
- Awards: Knight Bachelor (1911)

Academic background
- Education: Church Missionary Society College, Islington; Repton School
- Alma mater: St John's College, Cambridge

Academic work
- Discipline: Classics
- Institutions: University of Cambridge

Sir John Edwin Sandys FBA (/ˈsændz/ "Sands"; 19 May 1844 – 6 July 1922) was an English classical scholar.

== Life ==
Born in Leicester, England on 19 May 1844, Sandys was the 4th son of Rev. Timothy Sandys (1803–1871) and Rebecca Swain (1800–1853). Living at first in India, Sandys returned to England at the age of eleven and was educated at the Church Missionary Society College, Islington, then at Repton School. In 1863, he won a scholarship to St John's College, Cambridge.

On 17 August 1880, John married Mary Grainger Hall (1855–1937), daughter of Rev. Henry Hall (1820–1897), vicar of St Paul's Church in Cambridge. Mary was born in St Albans, Hertfordshire, and she died in Vevey, Switzerland, where she was a resident of the Hotel du Lac at the time of her death. She made a bequest to the Museum of Classical Archaeology, Cambridge (founded in 1884), which was the basis of a fund known as the Museum of Classical Archaeology Endowment Fund. John and Mary had no children.

Sandys died on 6 July 1922 in Cambridge. He is buried in the Parish of the Ascension Burial Ground in Cambridge.

== Works ==
Besides editing several Greek texts, Sandys published: An Easter Vacation in Greece (1886); a translation and enlargement (with H. Nettleship) of Oskar Seyffert's A Dictionary of Classical Antiquities, Mythology, Religion, Literature and Art (1891); and The Harvard Lectures on the Revival of Learning (1905). He is best known, however, for his A History of Classical Scholarship (Cambridge, England: Cambridge University Press) (3 vols.) (vol. 1, 1903; vols. 2 and 3, 1908). In 1910, Macmillan & Co. published the Latin speeches and letters that he gave as a public orator at the University of Cambridge from 1876 to 1909. He was also supervising editor of A Companion to Latin Studies (1910; 2nd ed., 1913).

== Recognition ==
Sandys obtained a Bell Scholarship and won several prizes for Greek and Latin prose. In 1867, he was elected Fellow at his college and was appointed to a lectureship, then later a tutorship. He was elected public orator in 1876 and was given the title orator emeritus when he retired in 1919. He was awarded honorary doctorates from the universities of Dublin (1892), Edinburgh (1909), Athens (1912) and Oxford (1920). He was made a Fellow of the British Academy (1909) and a Commander in the Greek Order of the Saviour. He was knighted in 1911.
