= Terry Gifford =

British academic (born 1946)

Terry Gifford (born in 1946) is a British scholar at Bath Spa University and poet.
