= Edwin Palmer =

English churchman and academic

Edwin Palmer (18 July 1824 – 17 October 1895) was an English churchman and academic, Corpus Professor of Latin at Oxford from 1870 to 1878 and archdeacon of Oxford from 1878 to his death.

== Life ==
His father William Jocelyn Palmer was rector of Mixbury in Oxfordshire. His mother Dorothea was daughter of the Rev. William Roundell of Gledstone, Yorkshire; there were six sons and four daughters, and William Palmer and Roundell Palmer were his two eldest brothers.

At Oxford, he met William Stubbs, who was his future bishop when he became archdeacon, at the Hermes debating society, and they became lifelong friends. As a Fellow of Balliol College he was one of an influential group of liberal theologians in the college: Benjamin Jowett, T. H. Green and William Lambert Newman were others. With Edward Charles Wickham he started the intercollegiate lectures in the university. Oliver Wendell Holmes was his guest at Balliol in 1866. In 1870, with his Latin professorship, he became a Fellow of Corpus Christi College.

He set off on travel for his [health] during the winter of 1849/50 with his brother William in the Levant, meeting Alexandros Mavrokordatos in Athens and visiting Smyrna to see Yevfimy Putyatin. They went on to Damascus and Jerusalem. Returning, they visited Mount Athos. The trip ended back in England in August 1850, with Edwin Palmer in better health.

== New Testament scholar ==
In 1881 Palmer edited The Greek Testament With the Readings Adopted by the Revisers of the Authorised Version , producing a Greek New Testament text representing the basis of the Revised Version. In the 1881 Revision it was stated "A revision of the Greek text was the necessary foundation of our work; but it did not fall within our province to construct a continuous and complete Greek text." Palmer's text was a post facto text, designed to meet the need of showing the Greek behind the decisions of the English committee, but worked up after completion of the English version of the New Testament rather than being the Greek text actually translated by the Committee. Later parallel editions from Oxford and Cambridge included a Received Text edition across from the Palmer edition. Palmer was assisted by Frederick Henry Ambrose Scrivener. The 1910 edition by Alexander Souter reproduces Palmer's text.
According to a booklet co-authored by Palmer, "Let a competent reader examine the Greek text as set forth in the Oxford edition of Archdeacon Palmer.... He will find, we believe, if he looks through the whole volume, not more than sixty-four readings in the Greek text of the Revisers which are to be found in the text of Dr. [Brooke Foss] Westcott and Dr. [Fenton John Anthony] Hort, and are not to be found in the Received Text or in the text of [Karl] Lachmann or [Constantin von] Tischendorf or [Samuel Prideaux] Tregelles."

== Family ==
He married Henrietta, daughter of Rev. James Riddell; Edwin James Palmer was their son, and they had two daughters.
