= Corpus Christi Professor of Latin =

Chair in literature at Oxford

The Corpus Christi Professorship of the Latin Language and Literature, also known simply as the Corpus Christi Professorship of Latin and previously as the Corpus Professorship of Latin, is a chair in Latin literature at Corpus Christi College, University of Oxford. The chair was created after the Oxford University Act 1854.

== List of Corpus Christi Professors of Latin ==
- 1854–1869: John Conington; first incumbent
- 1870–1878: Edwin Palmer
- 1878–1893: Henry Nettleship
- 1893–1913: Robinson Ellis
- 1913–1934: Albert Curtis Clark
- 1935–1953: Eduard Fraenkel
- 1953–1970: Sir Roger Mynors
- 1970–1992: Robin Nisbet
- 1992–2001: Michael Winterbottom
- 2002–2006: Philip Hardie
- 2008–present: Tobias Reinhardt

== See also ==
- Giger Professor of Latin, Princeton University
- Kennedy Professor of Latin, University of Cambridge
- Professor of Latin, University College London
- Regius Professor of Greek, University of Oxford
- Sather Professorship of Classical Literature, University of California, Berkeley
