= Oskar Seyffert (classical scholar) =

German classical philologist (1841–1906)

Oskar Seyffert Oskar Seyffert
- Born: 23 January 1841
- Died: 1 July 1906 (aged 65)

Academic background
- Education: University of Berlin

Academic work
- Discipline: Classical philology

Oskar Seyffert (23 January 1841 in Crossen an der Oder – 1 July 1906 in Bad Homburg vor der Höhe) was a German classical philologist. He specialized in studies of the Roman playwright Plautus.

He studied philology at the University of Berlin, where his instructors included August Boeckh, Moriz Haupt, Theodor Mommsen, Karl Müllenhoff and Friedrich Adolf Trendelenburg. In 1864 he obtained his PhD, then briefly served as an apprentice at the gymnasium in Frankfurt an der Oder and at the Grauen Kloster in Berlin. In 1865 he began work as a schoolteacher at the Sophien-Gymnasium in Berlin, where he later attained the titles of senior instructor (1872) and professor (1885).

== Published works ==
In 1882 he published a lexicon on ancient Greece and Rome, titled "Lexikon der klassischen Altertumskunde : Kulturgeschichte der Griechen und Römer : Mythologie und Religion, Litteratur, Kunst und Altertümer Staats- und Privatlebens", that was later edited, revised and published in English by Henry Nettleship and John Edwin Sandys as "A dictionary of classical antiquities, mythology, religion, literature and art". Other noteworthy writings by Seyffert include:

- Quaestionum metricarum particula : Bacchiacorum versuum usu Plautino, 1864.
- Studia Plautina, 1874.

In 1896–1897, with Paul Wendland, he published the journal "Jahresbericht über die Fortschritte der klassischen Altertumswissenschaft" ("Annual Reports of the Proceedings of Classical Scholarship"). Also, he was co-editor of the journal "Berliner Philologische Wochenschrift" which published reviews and articles every week.
