= Anne Dunan-Page =

French academic historian

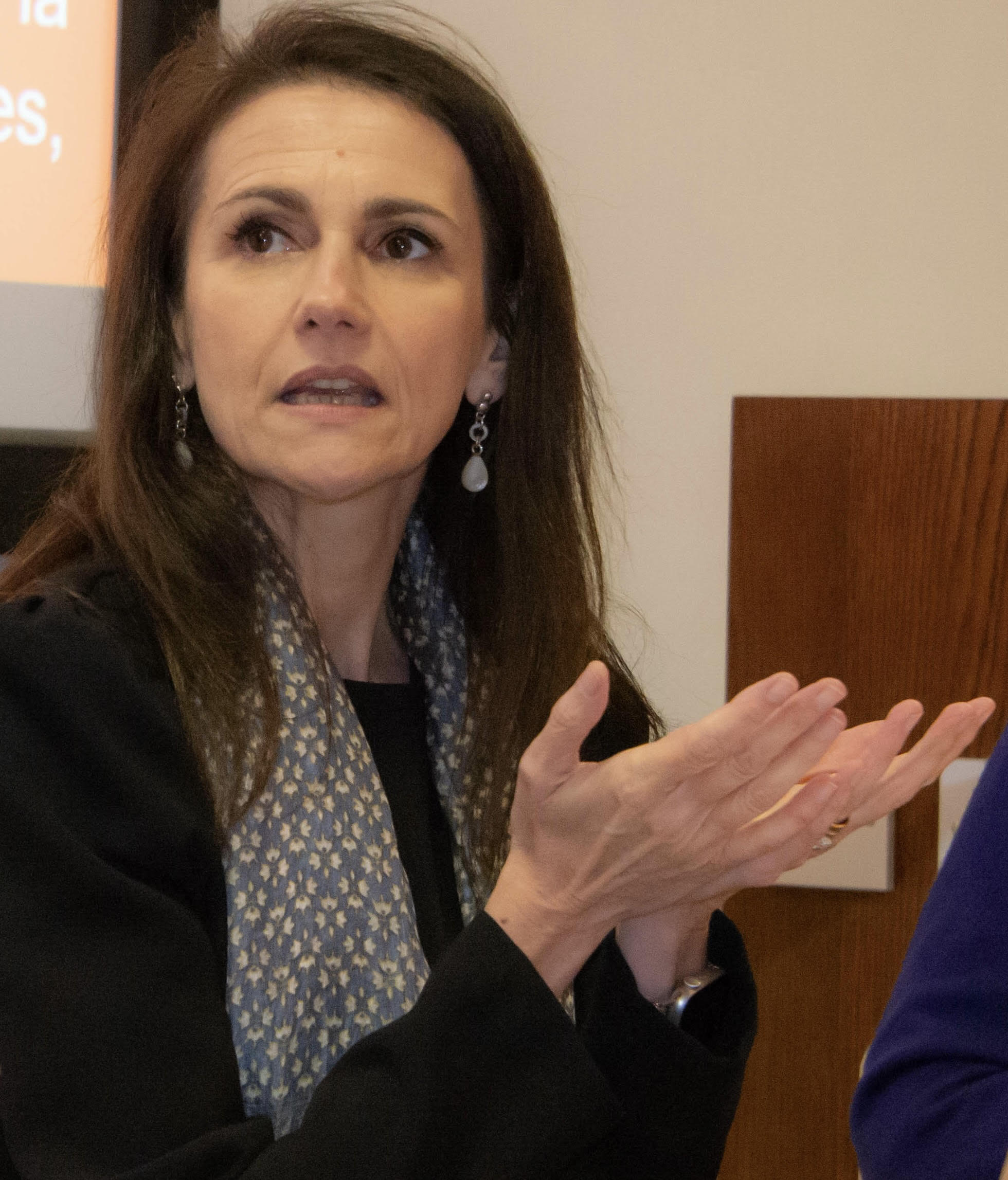
- Anne Dunan-Page speaking at a conference in 2024
- Born: 22 April 1971 (age 55); Nîmes
- Occupation: University professor
- Spouse: Christopher Page

Academic background
- Education: Université Paul-Valéry, Montpellier 3 Sidney Sussex College, University of Cambridge

Academic work
- Discipline: Historian of religion
- Institutions: Aix-Marseille University

Anne Dunan-Page, born in Nîmes on April 22, 1971, is a French historian of religion. She specialises in British dissent in the early modern period and the eighteenth century, with particular emphasis on the study of lived religion. She is Professor of Early-Modern British History and Civilisation at Aix-Marseille University. From 2026 to 2031 she holds a Senior Fundamental Chair at the Institut Universitaire de France. At Aix-Marseille University, she was head of the research centre for the English-speaking world from 2016 to 2020, and has been head of the Maison de la recherche at the School of Arts and Humanities since 2024. Between 2019 and 2023 she was First Vice President of the French National Council, Section 11 (Anglophone studies).

== Education ==
Anne Dunan-Page holds an M.Phil from the University of Cambridge (Sidney Sussex College, 1993) and is an agrégée in English (1996). She holds a PhD in English (2000) and a Habilitation (2009) from the University of Montpellier Paul Valéry.

== Career ==
Her career began as a lecturer at the University of Montpellier, Paul-Valéry, before becoming a tenured professor at the University of Provence, now Aix-Marseille University, in 2009. She has been vice president for Research of the Société des Anglicistes de l’Enseignement Supérieur, President of the International John Bunyan Society, and President of the French Society for Anglo-American Studies (17th and 18th centuries). She is the founding editor of an interdisciplinary collection at Manchester University Press.

She was a Visiting Fellow at Clare Hall, Cambridge (2004), Research Fellow (délégation CNRS) at the Maison française d’Oxford, Fellow of Lady Margaret Hall, a member of the Faculty of History at the University of Oxford (2010–2011) and a Visiting Researcher at Queen Mary University of London (2013–2016). She is currently an associate researcher at the Maison française d’Oxford.

In 2020 she launched the ‘Mapping Multifaith London’ project, endorsed by the Ecclesiastical History Society, which records and maps non-Anglican places of worship and memory in 18th-century London. In 2022, she was awarded a bilateral Hubert Curien partnership with Great Britain (Queen Mary University of London, with Tessa Whitehouse) to strengthen scientific cooperation between the two countries.

She is a participant in the interdisciplinary project ‘Religions and Societies Facing Contemporary Challenges’ set up by the French government, funded by the Agence nationale de la recherche (ANR 24-RSHS-0005) and led by the University of Strasbourg. She co-leads the groups ‘Religious Heritage and Memory(ies)’ with Anne Fornerod (University of Strasbourg) and Filippo Ronconi (EHESS) and ‘Situating Worship: Domestic Places, Institutionalized Places’ with Emma Aubin-Boltanski (EHESS) and Isabelle Saint-Martin (EPHE).

Dunan-Page's work has been reviewed in several English- and French-language peer-reviewed journals. She sits on the editorial boards of journals including The Journal of Ecclesiastical History and The Baptist Quarterly.

== Awards and distinctions ==
Her first monograph, Grace Overwhelming: John Bunyan, The Pilgrim’s Progress, and the Extremes of the Baptist Mind (New York, Oxford and Bern: Peter Lang, 2006) was awarded the Annual Research Prize of the Société des anglicistes de l’enseignement supérieur/Association française d’études américaines. In 2011, she was awarded the French National Order of Merit for services to higher education. In 2022, Dunan-Page delivered the Dr Williams's Library Annual Lecture on dissenting history at Gordon Square, London, the first French scholar to do so. In 2023, she was one of ten women chosen as leading French scholars awarded the Femmes en tête distinction on International Women's Day by the college des sociétés savantes académiques de France in recognition of her contributions to the advancement of research in her field.

== Principal publications ==
- Grace Overwhelming, John Bunyan, The Pilgrim’s Progress, and the Extremes of the Baptist Mind (New York, Oxford and Bern: Peter Lang, 2006) ISBN 978-3039100552
- The Religious Culture of the Huguenots, 1660-1750 (Aldershot: Ashgate, 2006). Ed. ISBN 978-1138355934
- Roger L’Estrange and the Making of Restoration Culture (Aldershot: Ashgate, 2008). Ed. with Beth Lynch ISBN 978-0754658009
- Les Huguenots dans les îles britanniques de la Renaissance aux Lumières. Écrits religieux et représentations (Paris: Honoré Champion, 2008), Collection « La vie des Huguenots », n° 43. Ed. with Marie-Christine Munoz ISBN 978-2745316752
- The Cambridge Companion to Bunyan (Cambridge: Cambridge University Press, 2010). Ed. ISBN 978-0511777523
- Croire à la lettre. Religion et épistolarité dans l’espace franco-britannique (Montpellier: Presses Universitaires de la Méditerranée, 2012), Collection « Le Spectateur Européen ». Ed. with Clotilde Prunier. ISBN 978-2367813073
- Debating the Faith: Religion and Letter Writing in Great Britain, 1550–1800 (Dordrecht : Springer, 2013), Collection « International Archives of the History of Ideas ». Ed. with Clotilde Prunier ISBN 978-9400752153
- Dissenting Hands, Bunyan Studies: A Journal of Reformation and Nonconformist Culture 20 (November 2016). Ed. with Michael Davies and Joel Halcomb
- An Inventory of Puritan and Dissenting Records, 1640–1714 (Queen Mary Centre for Religion and Literature in English, 2016). Comp. with Mark Burden, Michael Davies and Joel Halcomb
- L’Expérience puritaine. Vies et récits de dissidents (XVIIe-XVIIIe siècle) (Paris: Éditions du Cerf, 2017) ISBN 978-2204121712
- 'Circulation, Appropriation, Translation: George Herbert and John Bunyan', Bunyan Studies: A Journal of Reformation and Nonconformist Culture, 22 (2018). Ed. with Ana Paula Barros and W. R. Owens
- Church Life: Pastors, Congregations, and the Experience of Dissent in Seventeenth-Century England (Oxford: Oxford University Press, 2019). Ed. with Joel Halcomb and Michael Davies ISBN 978-0198753193
- The World of Seventeenth-Century Dissenters: Philosophy, Theology and Worship. Études Épistémè 35 (2019). Ed. with Ana Paula Barros and Laurence Lux-Sterritt
- Reconstructing Early-Modern Religious Lives: The Exemplary and the Mundane. E-rea 18.1 (2020). Ed. with Laurence Lux-Sterritt and Tessa Whitehouse
- Émergence et transformations du puritanisme en Angleterre, 1559–1642. Revue Française de Civilisation Britannique XXVII-3 (2022). Ed. with Sandrine Parageau
- Dictionnaire des études anglophones en France : histoire et épistémologie. 2024. Ed. with Sophie Vallas
