= Maren Linett =

American literary critic and academic

Maren Tova Linett is a literary critic and Professor of English at Purdue University. Her research focuses on modernist literature and Jewish studies, disability studies, and bioethics, and her major works include Modernism, Feminism, and Jewishness (2007), Bodies of Modernism (2017), and Literary Bioethics (2020). She has also published work in academic journals such as the Journal of Modern Literature, Twentieth-Century Literature, Disability Studies Quarterly, Journal of Medical Humanities, Journal of Literary and Cultural Disability Studies, Modernism/modernity, and ELH.

== Education and career ==
Linett earned her A.B. with honors from the University of Chicago and was a member of Phi Beta Kappa. She received her M.A. and Ph.D. from the University of Michigan. From 1999-2002, she was Assistant Professor of English at St. Cloud State University until she joined the Department of English at Purdue, where she is also the founding director of the Critical Disability Studies program.

Currently, Linett is a board member on the Modern Language Association's Disability Studies Forum Executive Committee, and she has also given invited talks at Harvard University, Columbia University, Penn State University, and Emory University. Her awards include the 2014 Tyler Riggs Prize for the best literary article in Disability Studies Quarterly from the Society for Disability Studies and a National Endowment for the Humanities grant to participate in the Summer Institute Global Histories of Disability in 2018.

== Work ==
Linett primarily researches modernist and contemporary Anglophone literature. Her work often applies "a reparative lens to canonical, obscure, and middlebrow texts alike," which places her writing "solidly in the terrain of new modernist studies." In this context, new modernist studies refers to what Douglas Mao and Rebecca Walkowitz define as the "temporal, spatial, and vertical" expansion of the field to critique canons, incorporate work by marginalized authors, and extend scholarly inquiry to matters of production, dissemination, and reception. Her chapter "Disability's Disruptions" appears in Mao's 2021 collection The New Modernist Studies.

More recently, Linett's work on bioethics considers literary-philosophical debates during and beyond the modernist era. At the Israeli Science Foundation Workshop "Coming to Attention," Linett presented research from her next project, Making Us New: From Eugenics to Transhumanism in Modernist Culture.

=== Modernism, Feminism, and Jewishness ===
Her first book argues that feminist writers of the interwar period "used the figure of the Jew to formulate their own identities in the literary marketplace." Building on the social theories of Zygmunt Bauman (e.g., allosemitism) and others, Linett's book was the first to link modernist studies, feminism, and Jewish cultural studies together. Maeera Schreiber notes that the book is "well-written, lucid, and imaginatively structured," and that its approach was significant because, until that point, scholars of modernism and Jewishness had largely "concentrated on male writers and poets. The issue of gender [had] focused largely on the feminized male." The book features criticism on well-known modernist women writers such as Virginia Woolf, Jean Rhys, and Djuna Barnes alongside lesser-known authors such as Dorothy Richardson and Sylvia Townsend Warner. Aviva Briefel also notes the book's impact: "Its innovative readings of the novels, impressive archival work, and often breathtaking connections" make important contributions to the field of Jewish literary studies.

=== Bodies of Modernism ===
Bodies of Modernism is the first book-length study to combine modernist studies and disability studies. It considers how various writers used "physical disabilities as a means to question ideas about sexuality, intimacy, communication, knowledge, and subjectivity more broadly." In addition to analyzing "high-brow" modernists such as Woolf and James Joyce, Linett also considers noncanonical texts such as Florence Barclay's The Rosary, a best-selling romance published in 1909. For Rebecca Sanchez, the book's "strength lies in its careful close readings of a broad range of texts and genres." Bodies of Modernism covers topics such as blindness, deafness, mobility, and sensory disabilities, including an analysis of normative and non-normative investments in disability. Many modernist writers vacillated between "anti- and hyper-normative commitments" to disability/able-bodiedness and, in some cases, related their experimentation with the form of the novel to disability and disfigurement. The "metaphoric meanings of disability" could, in this sense, "often [challenge] normative understandings of embodiment." In other words, Linett demonstrates the complex and sometimes contradictory ideological commitments of modernist authors concerning disability. Furthermore, as Tammy Berberi notes, in several instances Linett "draws on the evolution of manuscript versions," the result of which is "a rather prodigious contribution to modernist and disability studies."

=== Literary Bioethics ===
Framing literature as a site for exploring bioethical debates, Literary Bioethics analyzes The Island of Doctor Moreau, Brave New World, The Violent Bear it Away, and Never Let Me Go. Linett combines animal studies, disability studies, and literary/cultural theory to address topics such as animal ethics, aging, and eugenics. As D. Christopher Gabbard writes, "the book's core argument is that imaginative literature has a great deal to offer bioethics," as "complex imaginative literature" creates a "kind of thought laboratory." Participating in broader debates about the role of literature within the field of ethics, Linett often engages and complicates the work of contemporary ethicists, including Martha Nussbaum, Peter Singer, Tom Regan, Cora Diamond, and others. In particular, the Epilogue builds on Linett's previous research on eugenics in the modernist period to challenge the contemporary liberal eugenics movement. For Gabbard, the book is "especially helpful for those trying to think through thorny questions having to do with justice for both disabled people and animals."

== Selected bibliography ==
Books

- Modernism, Feminism, and Jewishness (Cambridge University Press, 2007)
- Bodies of Modernism: Physical Disability in Transatlantic Modernist Literature (University of Michigan Press, 2017)
- Literary Bioethics: Animality, Disability, and the Human (NYU Press, 2020)

Edited collections

- Cambridge Companion to Modernist Women Writers (2010)
- Virginia Woolf: An MFS Reader (2009)

Online publications

- "Viewing Literature as a Lab for Community Ethics"
