= Marilee Lindemann =

American educator and writer

- Born: Indiana, U.S.

Academic background
- Education: Indiana University (BA); Rutgers University (PhD)

Academic work
- Discipline: English studies, LGBT studies
- Institutions: University of Maryland, College Park

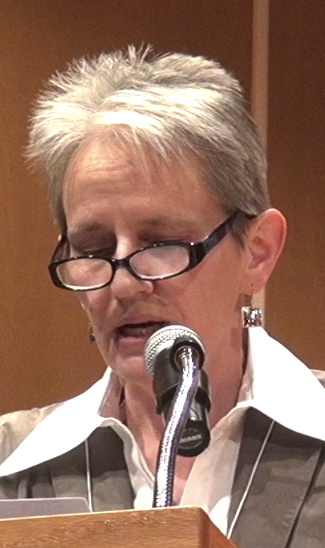
Lindemann reading in Maryland in 2012

Marilee Lindemann is an associate professor of English at the University of Maryland, College Park and the director of the university's LGBT studies program.

== Early life and education ==
Lindemann was born in Indiana. She received her BA in English and journalism from Indiana University, and her PhD in English from Rutgers University.

== Career ==
Lindemann was awarded a predoctoral Woodrow Wilson National Fellowship Foundation research grant in women's studies in 1988, and a predoctoral National Endowment for the Humanities Faculty Graduate Study Program for Historically Black Colleges and Universities Fellowship in 1990. She has taught at the University of Maryland since 1992. She is a prominent scholar of American writer Willa Cather and is also a well-known blogger and the editor of a forthcoming scholarly collection engaging with the phenomenon of blogs. She served on the editorial board of American Literature and on the board of managing editors of American Quarterly from 2001 to 2003, and she has served on the advisory board of the Cather Archive since 2006. She was the 2007 winner of the Modern Language Association's Michael Lynch Service Award.

== Personal life ==
Lindemann lives with her partner of more than twenty years, Martha Nell Smith, in Takoma Park, Maryland.

== Publications ==
BOOKS

- Willa Cather: Queering "America" (New York: Columbia University Press, 1999).
- The Cambridge Companion to Willa Cather (Cambridge: Cambridge University Press, 2005).
- Willa Cather, O Pioneers! with introduction, notes, and chronology (Oxford and New York: Oxford University Press, 1999).
- Willa Cather, Alexander's Bridge with introduction, notes, and chronology (Oxford and New York: Oxford University Press, 1997).

ARTICLES AND REVIEWS

- "Cather's 'Elastigirls': Reckoning with Sex/Gender Violence in the Woman Artist Stories" in Merrill Skaggs and Joseph Urgo, eds., Cather, Violence, and the Arts (2007)
- [Review] Willa Cather and the Politics of Criticism, and: Willa Cather and Others, and: Willa Cather: The Writer and Her World Legacy 2003,
- "Fear of a Queer Mesa?: Faith, Friendship, and National Sexuality in ‘Tom Outland's Story'" in John Swift and Joseph Urgo, eds., Willa Cather and the American Southwest (2002)
- "Disagreeing to Agree: A Reply to John Murphy and Joe Urgo." The Willa Cather Pioneer Memorial Newsletter and Review 45.2 (Fall 2001):
- "Who's Afraid of the Big Bad Witch?: Queer Studies in American Literature." American Literary History (Fall 2000):
- "'It Ain't My Prairie': Gender, Power, and Narrative in My Ántonia" in Sharon O'Brien, ed., New Essays on Willa Cather's My Ántonia (1999)
- "Fear of a Queer Prairie: Figures of the Body and/as the Nation in Willa Cather's Early Fiction" in Willa Cather Pioneer Memorial Newsletter and Review 42.2 (Fall 1998):
- "Willa's Case" in The Harvard Gay and Lesbian Review 3.1 (Winter 1996): 20–22. Rpt. in Richard Schneider Jr., ed., The Best of The Harvard Gay & Lesbian Review (1997)
- "'This Woman Can Cross Any Line': Power and Authority in Contemporary Women's Fiction" in Temma Berg, ed., Engendering the Word: Feminist Essays in Psychosexual Poetics (1989)
