= Forrest G. Robinson =

American literary historian (born 1940)

Forrest Glen Robinson
- Born: 1940 (age 85–86)

Academic work
- Discipline: History
- Institutions: University of California, Santa Cruz

Forrest Glen Robinson (born 1940) is an American literary historian. He is a professor of literature at the University of California, Santa Cruz and an author of books and articles on American literature especially of the American West and Mark Twain. He's the author of The Cambridge Companion to Mark Twain.

== Career ==
In 1972, Robinson was a Guggenheim Fellow.

=== Work ===
His work on "bad faith" in Mark Twain's writing was criticized for its basis in sociology, Marxist thought, and deconstruction "aimed at unmasking the deceptions that authors".. "practice on a public."

== Bibliography ==
- An Apology for Poetry (as editor). Indianapolis: Bobbs-Merrill (1970). Incl. introduction, notes.
- The Shape of Things Known: Sidney's Apology in its Philosophical Tradition. Cambridge, Mass.: Harvard University Press (1972).
- Wallace Stegner, with Margaret G. Robinson. Boston: Twayne Publishers (1977). ISBN 0805771824, 978-0805771824.
- In Bad Faith: Dynamics of Deception in Mark Twain's America. Cambridge, Mass.: Harvard University Press (1986). ISBN 978-0674445277.
- Love's Story Told: A Life of Henry A. Murray. Cambridge, Mass.: Harvard University Press (1992). ISBN 0674539281.
  - See: Henry A. Murray.
- Having it Both Ways: Self-subversion in Western Popular Classics. Albuquerque: University of New Mexico Press (1993). ISBN 0826314538.
- The New Western History: The Territory Ahead. Tucson: University of Arizona Press (1998).
- The Author-Cat: Clemens Life in Fiction. New York: Fordham University Press (2007).
- "Tom Exploits St. Petersburg's Hypocrisy." In: Readings on The Adventures of Tom Sawyer. New York: Greenhaven Press. pp. 77-85.
