= Robin Nisbet =

British classical scholar (1925–2013)

Robin Nisbet FBA
- Nisbet in 2000
- Born: 21 May 1925
- Died: 14 May 2013 (aged 87)

Academic background
- Education: Glasgow University; Balliol College, Oxford

Academic work
- Discipline: Latin Literature
- Institutions: Corpus Christi College, Oxford
- Doctoral students: Denis Feeney; R. J. Tarrant
- Main interests: Horace

Robert George Murdoch Nisbet, FBA (21 May 1925 – 14 May 2013), known as Robin Nisbet, was a British classicist and academic, specializing in Latin literature. From 1970 to 1992, he was Corpus Christi Professor of Latin at the University of Oxford.

He was the son of Robert G. Nisbet, who was also a classicist, lecturing at the University of Glasgow for 35 years, and author of a commentary on Cicero's speech De domo sua (1939).

Robin Nisbet was educated at the Glasgow Academy, then as an undergraduate at the University of Glasgow from 1943 to 1947, before going to Balliol College, Oxford, as Snell Exhibitioner to take a further undergraduate degree. After graduating in 1951 he moved to Corpus Christi College, Oxford, where he was appointed a fellow in 1952. He was elected Fellow of the British Academy (FBA) in 1987.

== Selected works ==
- Nisbet, R. G. M. (1961). M. Tulli Ciceronis in L. Calpurnium Pisonem oratio. Edited with text, introduction, and commentary. (Reprinted in paperback by the Clarendon Press 1987 ISBN 978-0198721314)
- Nisbet, R. G. M.; Hubbard, Margaret (1970). A commentary on Horace: Odes, Book I. Oxford: Clarendon Press. ISBN 978-0198144397.
- Nisbet, R. G. M.; Hubbard, Margaret (1978). A commentary on Horace: Odes, Book 2. Oxford: Clarendon Press. ISBN 978-0198144526.
- Nisbet, R. G. M. (1995). Harrison, S. J. (ed.). Collected papers on Latin literature. Oxford: Clarendon Press. ISBN 978-0198149484.
- Nisbet, R. G. M.; Rudd, Niall (2004). A commentary on Horace: Odes, Book 3. Oxford: Clarendon Press. ISBN 978-0199263141.

Academic offices
Preceded by Sir Roger Mynors	Corpus Christi Professor of Latin; University of Oxford; 1970 to 1992	Succeeded by Michael Winterbottom
