= Patrick Cheney =

Patrick Gerard Cheney (born July 24, 1949) is an American scholar of English Renaissance Literature. He is Edwin Erle Sparks Professor of English and Comparative Literature at the Pennsylvania State University.

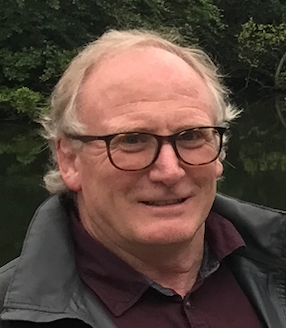
Patrick G. Cheney, 2017

== Education ==
Cheney received his BA degree from the University of Montana (1972) and his MA and PhD degrees from the University of Toronto (MA: 1974, PhD: 1979). He has taught at the Pennsylvania State University since 1980.

== Academic career ==
=== Works ===
Cheney's work covers both the poetry and the drama of early-modern England, Cheney's work focuses on genre and literary authorship, the sublime, classical reception (particularly of Virgil and Ovid), nationhood, and republicanism. He has been called “one of the leading practitioners of career criticism.” His published monographs include Spenser's Famous Flight: A Renaissance Idea of a Literary Career (1993), Marlowe's Counterfeit Profession: Ovid, Spenser, Counter-Nationhood (1997), Shakespeare, National Poet-Playwright (2004), Shakespeare’s Literary Authorship (2008), Marlowe’s Republican Authorship: Lucan, Liberty, and the Sublime (2009), Reading Sixteenth-Century Poetry (2011), and English Authorship and the Early Modern Sublime: Spenser, Marlowe, Shakespeare, Jonson (2018).

His first book, Spenser's Famous Flight: A Renaissance Idea of a Literary Career (1993), considers how Spenser's literary career changes the usual Virgilian career model (from pastoral to epic) to include the Petrarchan love lyric and Christian hymns. Cheney argues that Spenser's four-phase career aligns Virgilian fame with Christian glory as the highest ideal of poetry.

In Marlowe's Counterfeit Profession: Ovid, Spenser, Counter-Nationhood, (1997), Cheney discusses Christopher Marlowe's work in light of Ovid's literary career model from love elegy, to tragedy, to epic, seeing this Ovidian career model to rival the Spenser's Virgilian model. Cheney argues that by countering Spenser's more overt nationalism, Marlowe asserts the liberty of the poet as a national authority against the crown. Brian Striar writes that this book "represents an important step forward in Marlowe criticism, and it paves the way for the much needed engagement of Marlowe the scholar and translator in the construction of his entire oeuvre. It also finally redeems Marlowe from the shadow of Shakespeare and situates him, properly, as an independently prominent figure of Renaissance letters." Cheney extends his work on Marlowe's political and poetic dissidence in Marlowe’s Republican Authorship: Lucan, Liberty, and the Sublime (2009), defining liberty in light of early modern republican thought and the aesthetic category of the sublime. He argues that Marlowe places the freedom-loving poet at the center of a new form of republican art by building on the anti-monarchical work of the Roman poet Lucan.

Shakespeare, National Poet-Playwright (2004) and Shakespeare’s Literary Authorship (2008) focus on Shakespeare's non-dramatic works. Cheney discusses Shakespeare as an exceptionally capable poet as well as a playwright, modeling his poetry on the works of Ovid and Virgil. According to Lukas Erne, “Cheney’s work convincingly establishes that Shakespeare was not simply a playwright who occasionally happened to write poems, but that he was a poet and a dramatist throughout his career, writing poetry that could be lyric, narrative, or dramatic, and drama that could function as poems on the page or be adapted and abridged to function as plays onstage.” Richard Dutton calls Shakespeare, National Poet-Playwright “an important book, one which requires us to revisit some long-cherished constructions of Shakespeare’s career and of what we mean when we call him an “author.”

=== Editing and editions ===
Cheney is currently serving as the general editor of the fourteen volume The Oxford History of Poetry in English (forthcoming) and is one of the general editors of The Oxford Edition of the Collected Works of Edmund Spenser along with Elizabeth Fowler, Joseph Loewenstein, David Lee Miller, and Andrew Zurcher.

He has also contributed to other scholarly editions: "Shakespeare’s Poems": Venus Adonis, The Rape of Lucrece, "The Phoenix and Turtle", The Passionate Pilgrim, and "Attributed Poems" in The Norton Shakespeare, 3rd ed. (General Editor, Stephen Greenblatt, 2016), The Collected Poems of Christopher Marlowe (co-edited with Brian J. Striar, 2006).

Cheney has edited 1558-1660, Vol. 2 of The Oxford History of Classical Reception in English Literature (Co-Editor with Philip Hardie, 2015), in addition to nine edited collections of critical essays: The Cambridge Companion to Shakespeare’s Poetry (2007), Early Modern English Poetry: A Critical Companion (Co-Editor, with Andrew Hadfield and Garrett A. Sullivan, Jr., 2007), Early Modern English Drama: A Critical Companion (Co-Editor, with Garrett A. Sullivan, Jr., and Andrew Hadfield, 2006), The Cambridge Companion to Christopher Marlowe (2004), Imagining Death in Spenser and Milton (Co-Editor, with Elizabeth Jane Bellamy and Michael C. Schoenfeldt, 2003), Spenser Studies: A Renaissance Poetry Annual (Co-Editor with Theresa M. Krier and John Watkins, 2003), European Literary Careers: The Author from Antiquity to the Renaissance (Co-Editor, with Frederick A. de Armas, 2002), Worldmaking Spenser: Explorations in the Early Modern Age (Co-Editor, with Lauren Silberman, 2000), and Approaches to Teaching Shorter Elizabethan Poetry (Co-Editor, with Anne Lake Prescott, 2000).

Cheney sits on the editorial boards of Shakespeare Quarterly, Studies in English Literature, Oxford Bibliographies: British and Irish Literature, Authorship, and Spenser Studies.

== Honors ==
Cheney has received awards and fellowships from Pennsylvania State University the American Philosophical Society, visiting fellowships at All Souls College (2015) and Merton College (2001, 2015) at the University of Oxford, Marlowe Society of America, the Scholarly Editions Program at the National Endowment for the Humanities, Bibliographical Society of America, and a Mellon fellow at the Harry Ransom Center.
