= Susan Treggiari =

Historian on ancient Rome

Professor Emerita Susan Treggiari
- Awards: Guggenheim Fellow (1995–96)

Academic background
- Education: Cheltenham Ladies' College; Lady Margaret Hall

Academic work
- Discipline: Classics
- Sub-discipline: Marriage in ancient Rome
- Institutions: Stanford University

Susan Treggiari is an English scholar of ancient Rome, emeritus professor of Stanford University and retired member of the Faculty of Classics at the University of Oxford. Her specialist areas of study are the family and marriage in ancient Rome, Cicero and the late Roman Republic.

== Education ==
Treggiari was educated at Cheltenham Ladies' College, where she studied Latin from eleven and Greek from twelve. She studied Literae Humaniores at Lady Margaret Hall, Oxford, from 1958 to 1962, for which she was awarded a first, remaining for a further two years and writing a thesis supervised by P.A. Brunt, on Roman freedmen during the late Republic (published by the Clarendon Press, 1969). She held a Derby Scholarship for travel in Italy 1962–63 and was awarded an M.A. in 1965 and a B.Litt. in 1967. Her D.Litt. was awarded by Oxford in 1993.

== Career ==
Treggiari started teaching at various institutions in London from 1964, including Goldsmiths’ College (part-time) and the North-Western Polytechnic. She then taught at the University of Ottawa 1970–82 and at Stanford 1982–2001, where she was Anne T. & Robert M. Bass Professor in the School of Humanities and Sciences from 1992.

In 1993 she was awarded the Charles J. Goodwin Award of Merit of the American Philological Association. She has been a member of the American Academy of Arts and Sciences since 1995, and has also held the following fellowships:

- Guggenheim Fellow (1995–96),
- Visiting Fellow of Brasenose College (1976–77)
- Visiting fellow of All Souls College (1995–96), and an Honorary Fellow of Lady Margaret Hall (2011–).

She is a general editor of the Clarendon Press Ancient History Series (1994–), has been Joint Editor of Classical News and Views /Echos du monde classique, (1974–81) President of the Association of Ancient Historians and of the American Philological Association. She is a founding member of the Institute for Digital Archaeology Women in Classics Series and with Dr. Miriam Griffin co-hosted the inaugural Women in Classics Dinner at Somerville College, Oxford. She is also a consultant on the Oxford English Dictionary.

== Critical reception ==
Her work Roman Marriage. Iusti Coniuges from the Time of Cicero to the time of Ulpian, was reviewed in Bryn Mawr Classical Review, which said: "Susan Treggiari, with her superb command of the literary and legal sources, now offers us a grand vision of attitudes towards marriage in law and practice among the upper classes. Her inspiration is Crook's Law and Life of Rome 90 B.C.-A.D. 212, and her intention is to describe the institution of marriage at Rome. The result is a massive book that (as the title suggests) draws together an enormous amount of information from legal sources as well as from literary and epigraphic quarters. The excellent index and clear sign-posting within chapters will make this a book that all teaching Roman social history will want."

A similarly favorable review was published in Classical Philology, which said: "it is indispensable to all scholars who have any interest whatsoever in Roman marriage. In many respects, T.'s study is a counterpart to P. E. Corbett's The Roman Law of Marriage (Oxford, 1930), one of the few standard Roman law treatises that is also in English. But while T. does not avoid discussing legal sources, her concern is more with the social institution of marriage, and with what might be called its cultural dynamics as they emerge especially from literary and legal sources."

A review in Bryn Mawr Classical Review of Terentia, Tullia and Publilia. The women of Cicero’s family concluded: "This will be an extremely useful book for teachers and students taking courses about Roman women. Little previous knowledge is expected from readers, and short introductory sections provide basic information about Roman politics, law and society. It is difficult to say anything new about evidence which is generally well-known and thoroughly discussed, but having it all summarised in one place for the first time is in itself very helpful, and serves its avowed purpose of leaving readers to make up their own minds. Everything is presented in a clear and lucid style with a careful avoidance of going beyond what the sources can support."

== Works ==
=== Books ===
- Roman freedmen during the late Republic (Oxford: Clarendon Press, 1969, re-issued, Oxford University Press, 2000)
- Cicero's Cilician Letters, translated with an introduction and notes (London Association of Classical Teachers Original Records no. 10, 1973, second edition 1997)
- Roman Marriage. Iusti coniuges from the time of Cicero to the time of Ulpian (Oxford: Clarendon Press, 1991, paperback edition 1993)
- Roman social history (London: Routledge, Classical Foundations, 2002)
- Terentia, Tullia and Publilia. The women of Cicero’s family (London: Routledge, Women of Antiquity, 2007)
- Servilia and her Family (Oxford: Oxford University Press, 2019)

=== Articles ===
==== Articles on Roman history in journals and books ====
- ‘Pompeius' freedman biographer again’, Classical Review 19 (1969) 264–266
- ‘The freedmen of Cicero’, Greece and Rome 16 (1969) 195–204
- ‘Cicero, Horace and mutual friends: Lamiae and Varrones Murenae’, Phoenix 27 (1973) 245–261
- ‘Domestic staff at Rome in the Julio-Claudian period’, Social History/Histoire sociale 6 (1973) 241–255
- ‘Roman social history: recent interpretations’, Social History/Histoire sociale 8 (1975) 149–164
- ‘Jobs in the household of Livia’, Papers of the British School at Rome 43 (1975) 48–77
- ‘Family life among the staff of the Volusii’, Transactions of the American Philological Association 105 (1975) 393–401
- ‘Jobs for women’, American Journal of Ancient History 1 (1976) 76–104
- ‘Lower-class women in the Roman economy’, Florilegium 1 (1979) 65–86
- ‘Sentiment and property: some Roman attitudes’, A. Parel and T. Flanagan eds., Theories of property. Aristotle to the present (Waterloo: Wilfrid Laurier Press, 1979) 53–85
- ‘Urban labour in Rome: mercennarii and tabernarii’, Peter Garnsey ed., Non-slave labour in the Greco-Roman world (Cambridge: Cambridge Philological Society, 1980) 48–64
- ‘Mihi aqua haeret (Cic. QF 2.6.2)’, Liverpool Classical Monthly 5 (1980) 187–188
- ‘Contubernales in CIL vi’, Phoenix 35 (1981) 42–69
- ‘Concubinae’, Papers of the British School at Rome 49 (1981) 59–81
- ‘Consent to Roman marriage: who, why and how?’, Classical Views/Echos du monde classique 26 (n.s. 1) (1982) 34–44
- ‘Women as property in the early Roman Empire’, in D.K. Weisberg, ed., Women and the law. A social and historical perspective (Cambridge, Mass.: Schenkman, 1982) ii pp. 7–33
- ‘Digna condicio: betrothals in the Roman upper class’, Classical Views 28 (n.s. 3) (1984) 419–451
- ‘Iam proterva fronte: matrimonial advances by Roman women’, J.W. Eadie and J. Ober eds., The Craft of the ancient historian: Essays in honour of Chester G. Starr (Lanham: 1985) 331–352
- ‘Divorce Roman style: how easy and how frequent was it?’, in Beryl Rawson ed., Marriage, divorce and children in Ancient Rome (Canberra & Oxford, 1991) 31–46
- ‘Ideals and practicalities in matchmaking’, in David I. Kertzer and Richard P. Saller eds., The Family in Italy from antiquity to the present (New Haven, 1991) 91–108
- ‘Conventions and conduct among upper-class Romans in the choice of a marriage-partner’, International Journal of Moral and Social Studies 6.3 (1991) 187–215
- ‘Leges sine moribus’, Ancient History Bulletin 8.3 (1994) 86–98
- ‘Putting the bride to bed’, Classical Views / Echos du monde classique 38 (n.s. 13) (1994) 311–331
- ‘Social status and social legislation’ in Cambridge Ancient History X (Cambridge, 1996) Part IV section 27 pp. 873–904. Reviewed in CJ 93 (1997) 93-9
- ‘Women in Roman society’ in Diana E. E. Kleiner and Susan B. Matheson eds., I Claudia. Women in ancient Rome (New Haven: Yale University Art Gallery, 1996) 116–125
- Articles for third edition of the Oxford Classical Dictionary (1996): ‘Family, Roman’; revision of articles on ‘Adultery’, ‘Freedmen’, ‘Guardianship’, ‘Marriage, law of, Roman’, ‘patria potestas’; ‘adoptio’, ‘ius liberorum’, ‘manus’. ‘Adoption’, ‘Adultery’, ‘Family, Roman’ and ‘freedmen’ also appear in Oxford Companion to Classical Civilization (1998)
- ‘Ehe’, ‘Dos’ in Der Neue Pauly. Reallexikon der Antike III 896-9 and 798-9 (Stuttgart: Metzler). Also in Brill's New Pauly. Encyclopaedia of the Ancient World (Leiden, 2002–) vols. 4: 693–4 (‘Dos’) (2004) and 7 (forthcoming)
- ‘Home and forum: Cicero between `public' and `private'‘, Transactions of the American Philological Association 128 (1998) 1–23
- ‘The upper-class house as symbol and focus of emotion in Cicero’, Journal of Roman Archaeology 12 (1999) 33–56
- ‘Caught in the act: In filia deprehendere in the Lex Iulia de adulteriis’ in C. Damon, J. Miller and K. Myers eds, Vertis in usum. Studies in honour of Edward Courtney (München: Sauer, 2002) 243-9
- ‘Ancestral virtues and vices: Cicero on nature, nurture and presentation’ in David Braund and Christopher Gill eds, Myth, history and culture in republican Rome. Studies in honour of T. P. Wiseman (University of Exeter Press, 2003) 139-64
- ‘Marriage and family’ in S. Harrison ed., A Companion to Latin literature (Oxford: Blackwell, 2005) 372-84
- ‘Putting the family across: Cicero on natural affection’, in M. George ed. The Roman family in the Empire. Rome, Italy and beyond (Oxford: Oxford University Press, 2005) 9–35
- ‘Women in the time of Augustus’ in Karl Galinsky ed., The Cambridge Companion to the Age of Augustus (Cambridge: Cambridge University Press, 2005) 130-47
- ‘Case study I: Tullia’ (reprinted from Roman social history) in Suzanne B. Faris and Lesley E. Lundeen eds., Ten years of the Agnes Kirsopp Lake Michels Lectures at Bryn Mawr College (Bryn Mawr: Thomas Library, Bryn Mawr College, 2006) 108-34
- ‘Freedmen’, ‘Roman marriage’ in Oxford Encyclopedia of ancient Greece and Rome (2010) 3. 227-30 and 4. 353-6
- ‘Cicero’s women’, Ad familiares 44 (2013) 111-2
- ‘The education of the Ciceros’, in W. Martin Bloomer ed., A Companion to ancient education (Oxford: Wiley Blackwell, 2015) 240-51
- ‘Servilia who?’, Carleton University Friends of Greek and Roman Studies Newsletter Winter 2018 (Tuesday, 11 December 2018)

II Short articles in conference proceedings etc.

- ‘Lower-class women in the Roman economy’, Women's Classical Caucus Newsletter 3 (1978) 4 (abstract)
- ‘Rome: urban labour’, Seventh International Economic History Congress, theme B 3 (Edinburgh: E.U.P., 1978) 162- 165
- ‘Cicero's honour: preaching, perception and practice in the Speeches and Letters’, Festschrift for Beryl Rawson, 1999

==== Miscellaneous ====
- ‘A giddy parergon: Kipling and the classics’, Classical News and Views/Echos du monde classique 14 (1970) 1–12
- ‘Kipling's classics’, The Kipling Journal 39 (1972) 7–12
- ‘Quisque suos patimur manes: the classical writers at Oxford’, Classical News and Views/Echos du monde classique 16 (1972) 69–74
- (With A. Treggiari) ‘The Craftsman’, Kipling Journal 196 (1975) 4–6
- ‘Oral tradition and `The Elephant's Child' again’, Classical Philology 100 (1979) 417–419
- ‘On Kipling's Horace’, Classical Views/Echos du monde classique 29 (n.s. 4 )(1985) 421–433
- ‘Lilian Jeffery’, American Journal of Archaeology 92 (1988) 227–228
- Frith, Anne, Dorothy Smith, Anne Bauers and Susan Treggiari, Daniel of Beccles. Urbanus Magnus, the Book of the Civilized Man (Beccles, 2007)
- ‘The Latin poem’ in Frith, Anne et aliae, Daniel of Beccles. Urbanus Magnus, the Book of the Civilized Man (Beccles, 2007)
- ‘Kipling and the Classical World’, http://www.kipling.org.uk/bookmart_fra.htm (2012)
