= Steven Zwicker =

American journalist

Steven Nathan Zwicker (born June 4, 1943) is an American literary scholar and Professor Emeritus of English at Washington University in St. Louis. Zwicker was previously the Stanley Elkin Professor in the Humanities in Arts and Sciences.

== Biography ==
Zwicker is an expert on Restoration-era English literature and politics and is the author of Dryden's Political Poetry: The Typology of King and Nation (1972), Politics and Language in Dryden's Poetry: The Arts of Disguise (1984), and Lines of Authority: Politics and English Literary Culture, 1649-1689 (1993). He has edited six volumes and published more than two dozen essays in journals and volumes in the United States and abroad.

Zwicker was born in San Diego, California. He completed a BA the UCLA (1965), and an MA (1966) and PhD (1969) at Brown University. He was a Woodrow Wilson Scholar at Brown University. He has English faculty since 1969 at the Arts and Sciences at Washington University in St. Louis.

== Bibliography ==
=== Works ===
- Dryden's Political Poetry: The Typology of King and Nation. Providence, RI: Brown University Press, 1972.
- Politics and Language in Dryden's Poetry: The Arts of Disguise. Princeton, NJ: Princeton University Press, 1984.
- Lines of Authority: Politics and English Literary Culture, 1649-1689. Ithaca, NY: Cornell University Press, 1993.

=== As editor or contributor ===
- Politics of Discourse: The Literature and History of Seventeenth-Century England. Edited by Kevin Sharpe and Steven N. Zwicker. Berkeley, CA: University of California Press, 1987.
- The Cambridge Companion to English Literature, 1650-1740. Edited by Steven N. Zwicker. Cambridge, UK; New York: Cambridge University Press, 1998.
- Refiguring Revolutions: Aesthetics and Politics from the English Revolution to the Romantic Revolution. Edited by Kevin Sharpe and Steven N. Zwicker. Berkeley, CA: University of California Press, 1998.
- John Dryden: A Tercentenary Miscellany. Edited by Susan Green and Steven N. Zwicker. San Marino, CA: Huntington Library, 2001.
- Reading, Society, and Politics in Early Modern England. Edited by Kevin Sharpe and Steven N. Zwicker. Cambridge, UK; New York: Cambridge University Press, 2003.
- The Cambridge Companion to John Dryden. Edited by Steven N. Zwicker. Cambridge, UK; New York: Cambridge University Press, 2004.
