= Philip Hardie =

British classical philologist

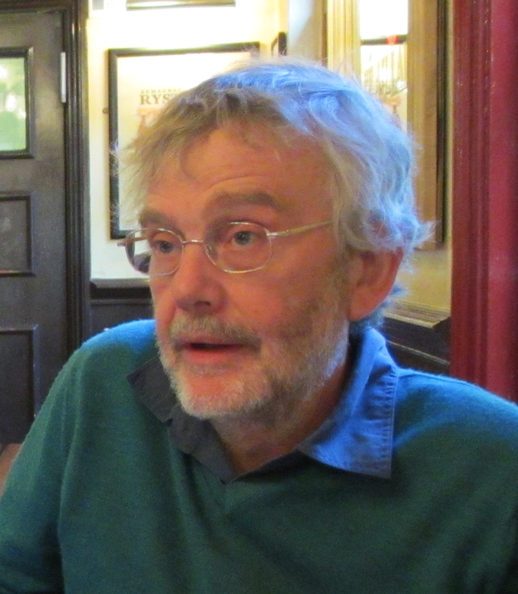
Professor Philip Russell Hardie

Philip Russell Hardie, FBA (born 13 July 1952) is a specialist in Latin literature at the University of Cambridge. He has written especially on Virgil, Ovid, and Lucretius, and on the influence of these writers on the literature, art, and ideology of later centuries.

Philip Hardie was educated at St Paul's School, London and Corpus Christi College, Oxford. He was Corpus Christi Professor of the Latin Language and Literature at the University of Oxford (2002–6), and since 2006 he has been Senior Research Fellow and Honorary Professor of Latin at Trinity College, Cambridge. In 2000 he was elected a fellow of the British Academy. In 2014 he was elected as an honorary fellow of the Australian Academy of the Humanities, and in spring 2016 was the 102nd Sather lecturer at the University of California, Berkeley. He is also a member of the Academia Europaea.

== Selected works ==
=== Major works ===
- Celestial Aspirations: Classical Impulses in British Poetry and Art (Princeton University Press, 2022), ISBN 978-0-69119-786-9
- Classicism and Christianity in Late Antique Latin Poetry (Univ. California Press 2019), ISBN 978-0-52029-577-3
- The Last Trojan Hero. A Cultural History of Virgil's Aeneid (Tauris 2014), ISBN 978-1-78076-247-0
- Rumour and Renown: Representations of Fama in Western Literature (Cambridge University Press 2012), ISBN 978-0-521-62088-8
- Lucretian Receptions: History, the Sublime, Knowledge (Cambridge University Press 2009), ISBN 0-521-76041-0
- Ovid's poetics of illusion (Cambridge 2002), ISBN 0-521-80087-0
- Virgil (Greece & Rome. New surveys in the classics, Bd. 28; Cambridge University Press, 1998), ISBN 0-19-922342-4
- The Epic Successors of Virgil. A Study in The Dynamics of a Tradition (Roman Literature and its Contexts; Cambridge 1993), ISBN 0-521-41542-X
- Virgil's Aeneid: Cosmos and Imperium (Oxford 1986), ISBN 0-19-814036-3

=== Edited works ===
- (with Patrick Cheney) The Oxford History of Classical Reception in English Literature, vol. 2: 1558-1660 (Oxford University Press 2015), ISBN 9-780-19885-916-1
- (with Helen Moore) Classical Literary Careers and their Reception (Cambridge University Press 2010), ISBN 0-521-76297-9
- Paradox and the Marvellous in Augustan Literature and Culture (Oxford University Press 2009), ISBN 0-19-923124-9
- Conington's Virgil. Edited by John Conington and Philip R. Hardie. Set of Six Volumes. (Liverpool University Press, Liverpool 2009), ISBN 9-781-90467-576-1
- (with Stuart Gillespie): Cambridge Companion to Lucretius (Cambridge 2007), ISBN 0-521-61266-7
- Cambridge Companion to Ovid (Cambridge 2002), ISBN 0-521-77528-0
- (with Alessandro Barchiesi and Stephen Hinds): Ovidian Transformations. Essays on Ovid's Metamorphoses and Its Reception (Cambridge Philological Society, Supplementary Volume no. 23, 1999), ISBN 0-906014-22-0
- Virgil: Critical Assessments (Routledge 1999), ISBN 0-415-15245-3

=== Commentaries ===
- A commentary on Ovid Metamorphoses, vol. 3, Books 13-15 (Cambridge University Press, 2024)
- Virgil, Aeneid Book IX (Cambridge Greek and Latin Classics, 1994), ISBN 0-521-35126-X
