= Sather Professorship of Classical Literature =

Chair at the University of California, Berkeley

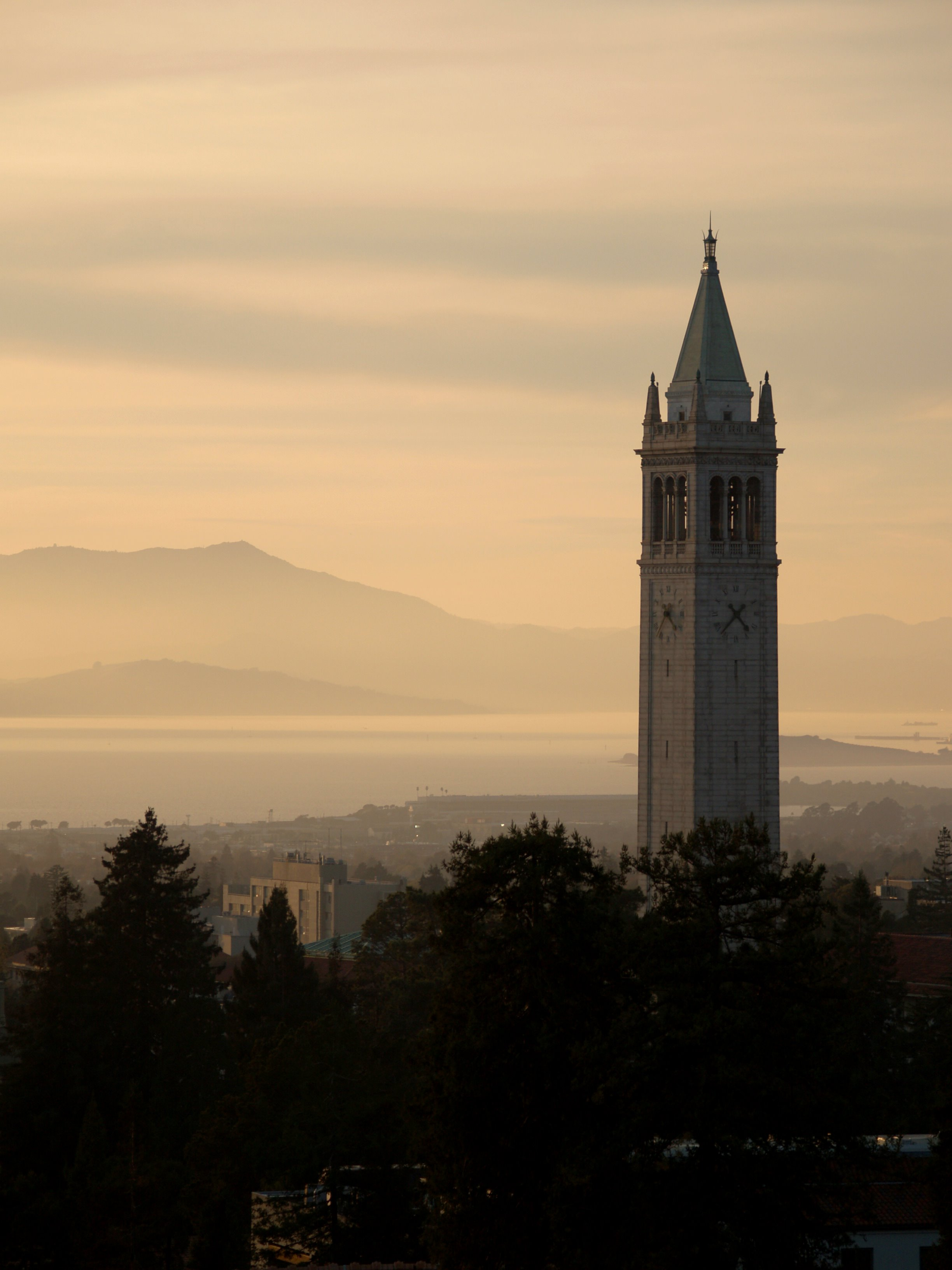
Sather Tower at the University of California, Berkeley

The Jane K. Sather Professorship of Classical Literature is an endowed chair for the study of classics at the University of California, Berkeley. Established in 1914 after a donation by Jane K. Sather, widow of the Norwegian-American banker Peder Sather, the professorship requires its holder to spend one term at the university. Sather Professors would teach a full programme of classes. Since 1919, the post entails a set of lectures on a unified topic which is later published as a book by the University of California Press. According to classicist Oliver Taplin, the chair is "the most prestigious [professorship] in the subject in the world".

== Foundation ==
In 1886, the Norwegian-American banker Peder Sather died, leaving a substantial fortune to his second wife Jane K. Sather. In 1900, after managing the bequest herself for some time, she decided to make an initial donation of $75,000 and other assets to the University of California at Berkeley. At this time, Sather stipulated that her donation be used to establish a professorship of the Classics and a fund for the study of law. Shortly before her death in 1911, she arranged for the funds to be consolidated; they were now to pay for what would become the Sather Tower and the establishment of two professorships: one in Classics and one in historiography. The Regents of the University of California complied with Sather's wishes and divided her donation accordingly. $100,000 were allocated for each of the professorships. Although her husband had accumulated the initial donation, both the tower and the professorships were named after her. In 1914, Benjamin Ide Wheeler, the university's president, appointed the British archaeologist John Myres to be the first holder of the chair.

== Professorship ==
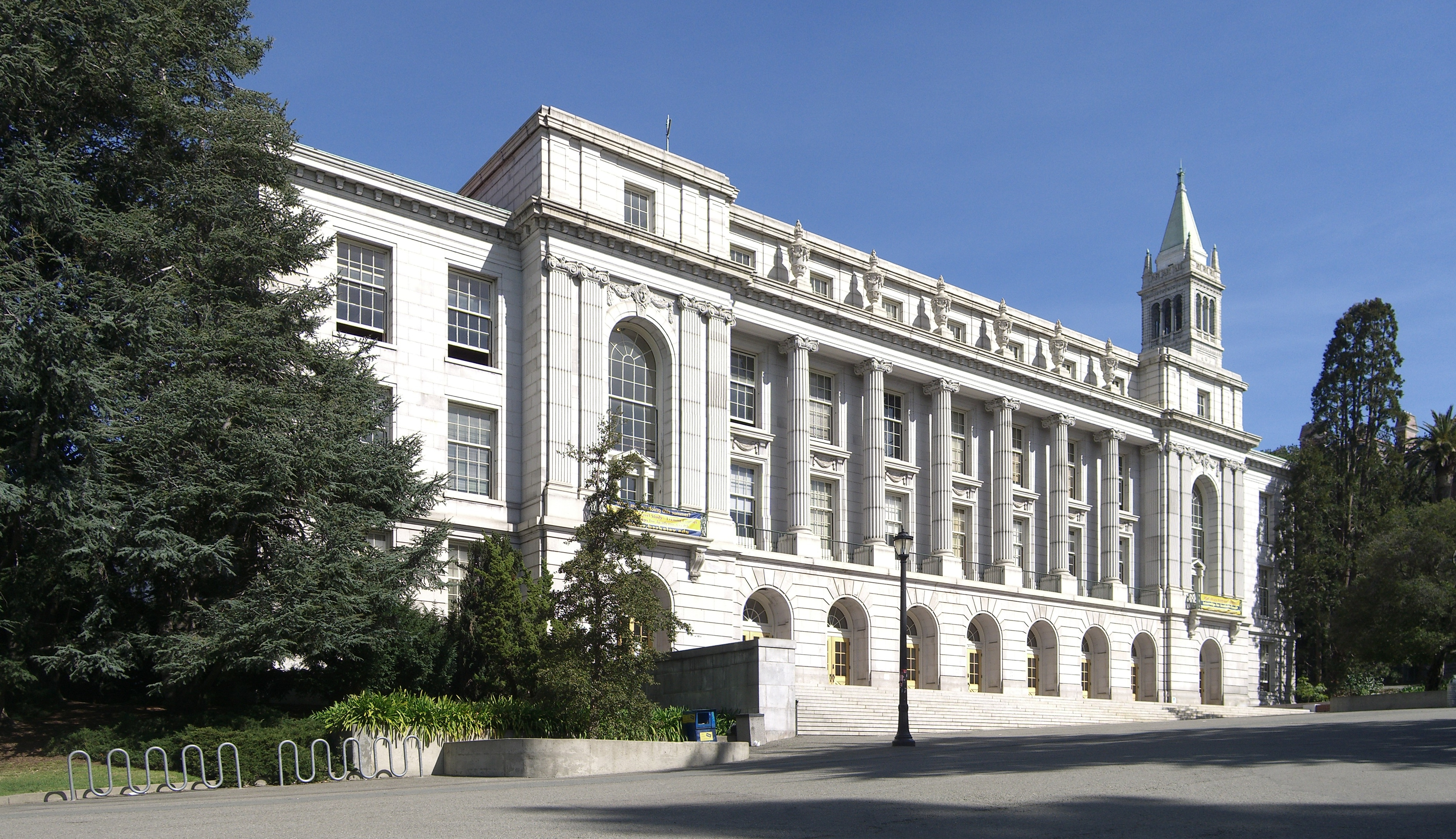
Wheeler Hall, where the Sather professor traditionally lectures

Initially, holder of the professorship would spend one term at Berkeley, teaching a full programme of classes. In 1919, classicists Ivan Mortimer Linforth and George Calhoun modified the nature of the appointment: henceforth, holders would give a specified number of lectures (initially eight, later six) on a unified topic. The lectures should then be published as a book by the University of California Press. Until 1952, Sather Professors were given access to an office in the university's Wheeler Hall which included its own lavatory. The office has since been replaced by rooms in Dwinelle Hall furnished with a dedicated library and portraits of past holders of the chair.

The Sather Professorship has been held by numerous distinguished scholars including Cyril Bailey, E. R. Dodds, Denys Page, Geoffrey Kirk, Ronald Syme, Edward Rand, and Bernard Knox. Appointments in the 21st century have included Latinists Philip Hardie, Alessandro Barchiesi, and Denis Feeney, Hellenists Helene P. Foley, and Gregory Nagy, and historians Mary Beard and Nicholas Purcell. According to classicist Oliver Taplin, the chair is "the most prestigious [professorship] in the subject in the world".

=== List of Sather Professors ===
Beginning in 1919, the duties of the Sather Professorship included a series of six lectures preparatory to book-length publication. From 1967 to 2001, lecture series titles were not publicized; in these cases, the subsequent book title is given. Lecture series that did not or have not yet resulted in a book publication are indicated with a §.

Year	Professor	Lecture Topic
1913–14	John Myres (I)	
1914–15	Henry W. Prescott	"The Classical Epic"
1915–16	no professor appointed due to World War I	
1916–17	Paul Shorey (I)	"The Broader Aspects of Platonism in European Literature"
1916–17	Gordon Jennings Laing	"Ancient Etruria"
1917–18	Francis Greenleaf Allinson	"The Greeks in Literature and Life"
1917-18	William Kelly Prentice	no formal series
1918–19	Paul Shorey (II)	no formal series
1919–20	Edward Kennard Rand	"The History of Classical Culture during the Middle Ages"; "The History of Pastoral Literature"
1920–21	John Adams Scott	"The Unity of Homer"
1921–22 §	George L. Hendrickson	"Roman Satire"
1922–23	Herbert Weir Smyth	"Aeschylean Tragedy"
1923–24	Terrot R. Glover	"Herodotus"
1924–25	Duane R. Stuart	"Epochs of Greek and Roman Biography"
1925–26	John Burnet	"Platonism"
1926–27	John Myres (II)	"Who Were the Greeks?"
1927–28	Arthur L. Wheeler	"Catullus and the Traditions of Ancient Poetry"
1928–29	Paul Shorey (III)	"Platonism Ancient and Modern"
1929–30	Tenney Frank	"Life and Literature of the Roman Republic"
1930–31	Martin P. Nilsson	"The Mycenean Origins of Greek Mythology"
1931–32	Cyril Bailey	"Phases in the Religion of Ancient Rome"
1932–33	Robert J. Bonner	"Aspects of Athenian Democracy"
1933–34 §	William Abbott Oldfather	"The Decline of Culture within the Roman Empire"
1934–35	Werner Jaeger	"Demosthenes: the Origin and Growth of his Policy"
1935–36	J. Wight Duff	"Roman Satire: Its Outlook on Social Life"
1936–37	Samuel Eliot Bassett	"The Poetry of Homer"
1937–38 §	Benjamin Oliver Foster^{[A]}	no regular series due to Foster's death
1938–39 §	Henri Grégoire	"Constantine the Great and the Triumph of Christianity"
1939–40	H.J. Rose	"The Eclogues of Virgil"
1940–41	Axel W. Persson	"The Religion of Greece in Prehistoric Times"
1941–42 §	John Beazley^{[B]} (I)	no regular series due to World War II
1942–43	Hermann Fränkel	"Ovid: a Poet between Two Worlds"
1943–44	Gilbert Norwood	"Pindar"
1944–45	Rhys Carpenter	"Folk Tale, Fiction, and Saga in the Homeric Epic"
1945–46	Max Ludwig Wolfram Laistner	"The Greater Roman Historians"
1946–47	Lily Ross Taylor	"Party Politics in the Age of Caesar"
1947–48	Levi Arnold Post	"From Homer to Menander: Forces in Greek Poetic Fiction"
1948–49	Sir John Beazley (II)	"The Development of Attic Black-Figure"
1949–50	E.R. Dodds	"The Greeks and the Irrational"
1950–51	Ben Edwin Perry	"The Greek Romances"
1951–52	Arnold Wycombe Gomme	"The Greek Attitude to Poetry and History"
1952–53	André-Jean Fegustière	"Personal Religion among the Greeks"
1953–54	Jakob Larsen	"Representative Government in Greek and Roman History"
1954–55	Joshua Whatmough	"Poetic, Scientific, and Other Forms of Discourse"
1955–56	Sir Frank Adcock	"The Greek and Macedonian Art of War"
1956–57 §	Georges Daux	"An International Organization in Antiquity: The Delphic Amphictiony"
1957–58	Denys Page	"History and the Homeric Iliad"
1958–59	Benjamin Dean Meritt	"The Athenian Year"
1959–60	Sir Ronald Syme	"Sallust"
1960–61	H.D.F. Kitto	"Poiesis, or Literary Structure"
1961–62	Arnaldo Momigliano	"The Classical Foundations of Modern Historiography"
1962–63	Bernard Knox	"The Heroic Temper: Studies in Sophoclean Tragedy"
1963–64	Bruno Snell	"Scenes from Greek Drama"
1963–64	Sterling Dow	"Knossos and Mycenae: the Great Powers in the Bronze Age"
1964–65 §	Viktor Pöschl	"Man and Politics in Tacitus"
1965–66	William Bedell Stanford	"The Sound of Greek Poetry"
1966–67	Kenneth Dover	"Lysias and the Corpus Lysiacum"
1967–68	E. J. Kenney	The Classical Text
1968–69	Geoffrey Kirk	Myth: Meaning and Functions
1969–70	Hugh Lloyd-Jones	The Justice of Zeus
1970–71	F. W. Walbank	Polybius
1971–72	Moses Finley	The Ancient Economy
1972–73	Gordon Willis Williams	Change and Decline. Roman Literature in the Early Empire
1973–74	Albrecht Dihle	The Theory of Will in Classical Antiquity
1974–75	Emily Vermeule	Aspects of Death in Early Greek Art and Poetry
1975–76 §	Ernst Badian	
1976–77	Walter Burkert	Structure and History in Greek Mythology and Ritual
1977–78	C. J. Herington	Poetry into Drama. Early Tragedy and the Greek Poetic Tradition
1978–79 §	James Frank Gilliam	
1979–80 §	G. E. L. Owen	
1980–81	Emilio Gabba	Dionysius and the History of Archaic Rome
1981–82	Wendell Clausen	Virgil's Aeneid and the Tradition of Hellenistic Poetry
1982–83	Christian Habicht	Pausanias' Guide to Ancient Greece
1983–84	G. E. R. Lloyd	The Revolutions of Wisdom : Studies in the Claims and Practice of Ancient Greek Science
1984–85	Anthony Snodgrass	An Archaeology of Greece
1985–86	Averil Cameron	Christianity and the Rhetoric of Empire : The Development of Christian Discourse
1986–87 §	T. C. Gelzer	
1988–89	Bernard Williams	Shame and Necessity
1989–90 §	Albert Henrichs	
1990–91	Paul Zanker	The Mask of Socrates. The Image of the Intellectual in Antiquity
1991–92	Glen Bowersock	Fiction as History : Nero to Julian
1992–93	Alexander Nehamas	The Art of Living : Socratic Reflections from Plato to Foucault
1993–94	Anne Pippin Burnett	Revenge in Attic and Late Tragedy
1994–95	Gian Biagio Conte	Julian
1995–96 §	Froma Zeitlin	
1996–97	Brunilde Ridgway	Prayers in Stone : Greek Architectural Sculpture ca. 600-100 B.C.E.
1997–98	Michael Frede	A Free Will. Origins of the Notion in Ancient Thought
1998–99	Henk Versnel	"Coping with the Gods; Wayward Readings in Greek Theology"
1999–2000 §	Anna Morpurgo Davies	"Names and Naming in Ancient Greece: Language, Culture and Continuity"
2000–01	Brian Stock	Augustine's Inner Dialogue. The Philosophical Soliloquy in Late Antiquity
2001–02	Gregory Nagy	"Homer the Classic"
2002–03	Fergus Millar	"A Greek Roman Empire: Power, Belief and Reason under Theodosius II (A.D. 408-450)"
2003–04	Denis Feeney	"Charts of Roman Time: The Uses of Time in the Formation of Roman Culture"
2004–05	David Sedley	"Creationism and Its Critics in Antiquity"
2005–06	Roger S. Bagnall	"Everyday Writing in the Graeco-Roman East"
2006–07	Tonio Hölscher	"Visual Power in Ancient Greece and Rome"
2007–08	Helene P. Foley	"Reimagining Greek Tragedy on the U.S. Stage"
2008–09	Mary Beard	"Roman Laughter"
2009–10 §	Heinrich von Staden	"The Scientific Lives of Animals: Ancient Greece and Rome"
2010–11 §	Alessandro Barchiesi	"The War for Italia: Conflict and Collective Memory in Vergil's Aeneid"
2011–12 §	Nicholas Purcell	"Venal Histories: The Character, Limits, and Historical Importance of Buying and Selling in the Ancient World"
2012–13	Robert Parker	"Greek Gods Abroad"
2013–14 §	François Lissarrague	"Panta Kala: Heroic Warriors and the Aesthetics of Weaponry in Greek Art"
2014–15 §	Richard P. Martin	"Comic Community: Laughter and Loathing in Athens"
2015–16	Philip Hardie	"Classicism and Christianity in Late Antique Latin Poetry"
2016–17 §	M. M. McCabe	"Seeing and Saying: Plato on Virtue and Knowledge"
2017–18 §	Maurizio Bettini	"City of the Spoken Word: Orality and the Foundations of Roman Culture"
2018–19	Jack L. Davis	"A Bronze Age Greek State in Formation"
2019–20	Josiah Ober	"The Greeks and the Rational: The Discovery of Practical Reason"
2020–21	Four Lectures, Four Sather Professors – A Special Remote Series^{[C]}	
2021–22	Emily Gowers	"The Small Stuff of Roman Antiquity"
2022–23 §	Greg Woolf	"The Rhythms of Rome: Seasonality and society in the early empire"
2023–24	Victoria Wohl	"The Poetry of Being and the Prose of the World in Early Greek Philosophy"
2024–25	A Reprise of Sather “Greatest Hits”^{[D]}	
2025–26 §	Emily Greenwood	"Conversing on the Outside: Ancient Greek Dialogues and Black Feminist Thought"

=== Notes ===
A: Benjamin Oliver Foster died before assuming his professorship. In his stead, Oscar Broneer and Theodore Wade-Gery delivered three lectures each.
B: The outbreak of World War II prevented John Beazley from assuming his professorship. In his stead, Carl Blegen and Harold F. Cherniss delivered three lectures each. Beazley was reappointed in 1948.
C: Four returning Sather professors—François Lissarrague, Mary Beard, Maurizio Bettini, and Mary Margaret McCabe—gave one lecture each.
D: Four returning Sather professors—Victoria Wohl, Josiah Ober, Greg Woolf, and Emily Gowers—gave one lecture each.

== Impact ==
Writing for The Times Literary Supplement, poet and author Robert Bringhurst states that the Sather Lectures and its associated publications "include many major works of classical scholarship". The 1969 Lectures, given by Hellenist Hugh Lloyd-Jones, offered "an important re-examination of the religious beliefs of the Greeks in the pre-classical and classical periods". They resulted in 1971 in the publication of Lloyd-Jones' first influential publication, The Justice of Zeus. In 1970, historian F. W. Walbank delivered the Sather Lectures on the Greek writer Polybius. His resulting book, Polybius (1972), was still considered the standard work on this topic in the early 21st century. In 2007, Helene P. Foley gave the first Sather Lecture on the topic of classical reception studies. Analysing the re-performance of classical plays in the United States, her lectures are described by Taplin as "somewhat of a milestone" in moving the subject closer to the mainstream of classical scholarship.

== See also ==
- Corpus Christi Professor of Latin, University of Oxford
- Giger Professor of Latin, Princeton University
- Kennedy Professor of Latin, University of Cambridge
- Regius Professor of Greek, University of Cambridge
- Regius Professor of Greek, University of Oxford

== Bibliography ==
- Bringhurst, Robert (17 October 2014). "Alphabet Soup". The Times Literary Supplement.
- Dow, Sterling (1965). Fifty Years of Sathers. The Sather Professorship of Classical Literature in the University of California, Berkeley 1913/4–1963/4. Berkeley, California: University of California Press. doi:10.1525/9780520329935. ISBN 978-0-520-32993-5.
- Fontenrose, Joseph (1982). Classics at Berkeley: the First Century 1869-1970. Berkeley, California: Department of Classics History Fund. OCLC 9325391.
- Taplin, Oliver (10 May 2013). "Review of Helen P. Foley, Reimagining Greek Tragedy on the American Stage". The Times Literary Supplement.
- Wilson, Nigel (11 December 2009). "Professor Sir Hugh Lloyd-Jones". The Independent.
