= Blockeley =

Minecraft server recreating the UC Berkeley campus

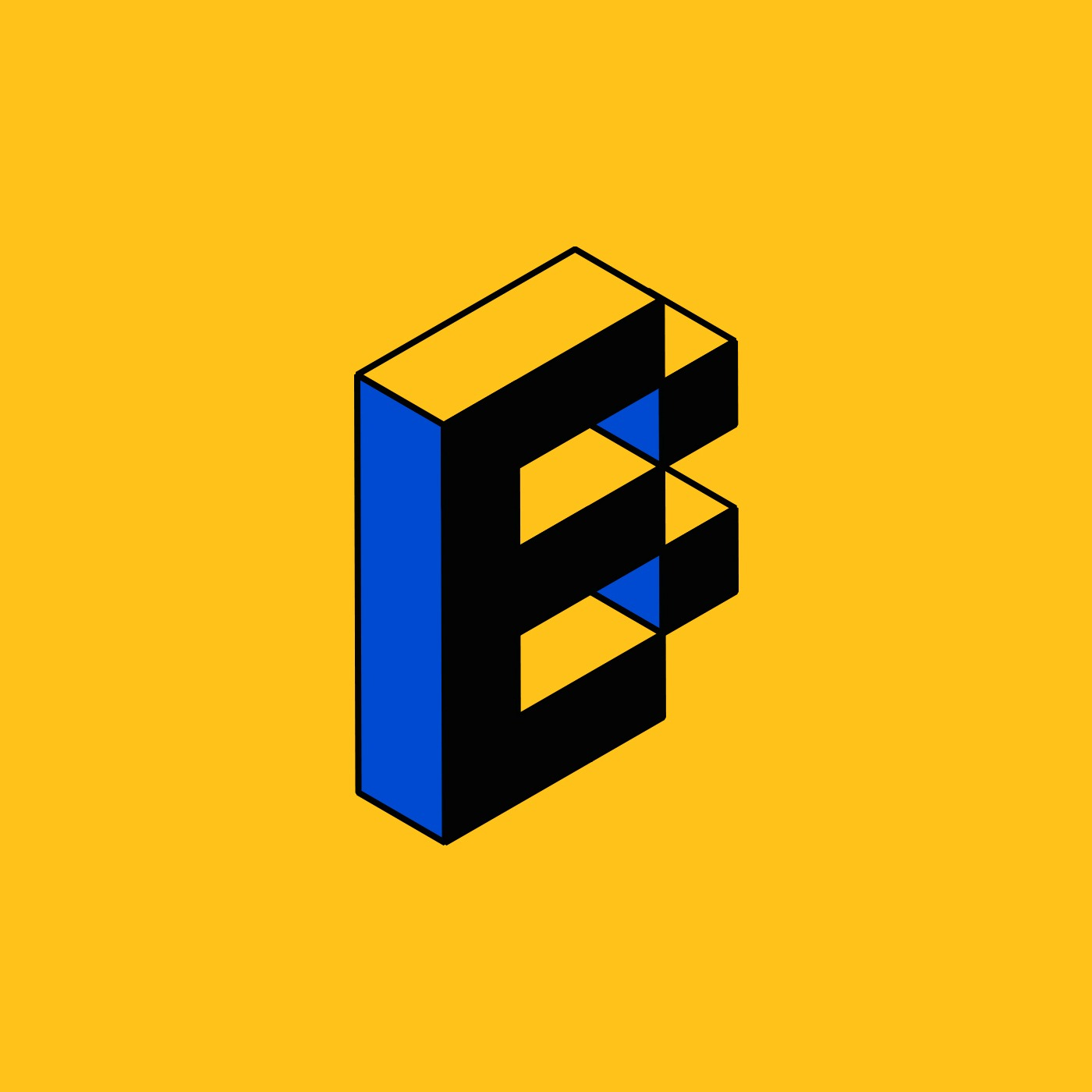
- Initial release: March 15, 2020; 6 years ago
- Website: blockeley.com; mc.blockeley.com (server)

Blockeley is a Minecraft server created by students of the University of California, Berkeley, which is a 1:1 scale (Note: 1 block equals 1 meter) reconstruction of the university campus.

The project was started by student Bjorn Lustic who got the idea from a sarcastic Facebook comment; as the project grew more than 500 students applied to help build the server. Growing from the initial plan of building Memorial Stadium, Lustic and his team would go on to work on the rest of the university.

The server was used by the university to host the 2020 and 2021 UC Berkeley graduation ceremonies during the COVID-19 pandemic. The server hosted a music festival presented by Beauz and produced by their artist manager Antonio Di Puorto and his team. The two-day event included guest performances by Cash Cash, Sam Feldt, and Vini Vici and 60 more artists.

The Associated Students of the University of California has worked in collaboration with the building team to continue to host events on the server during the continued COVID-19 pandemic.

== History ==
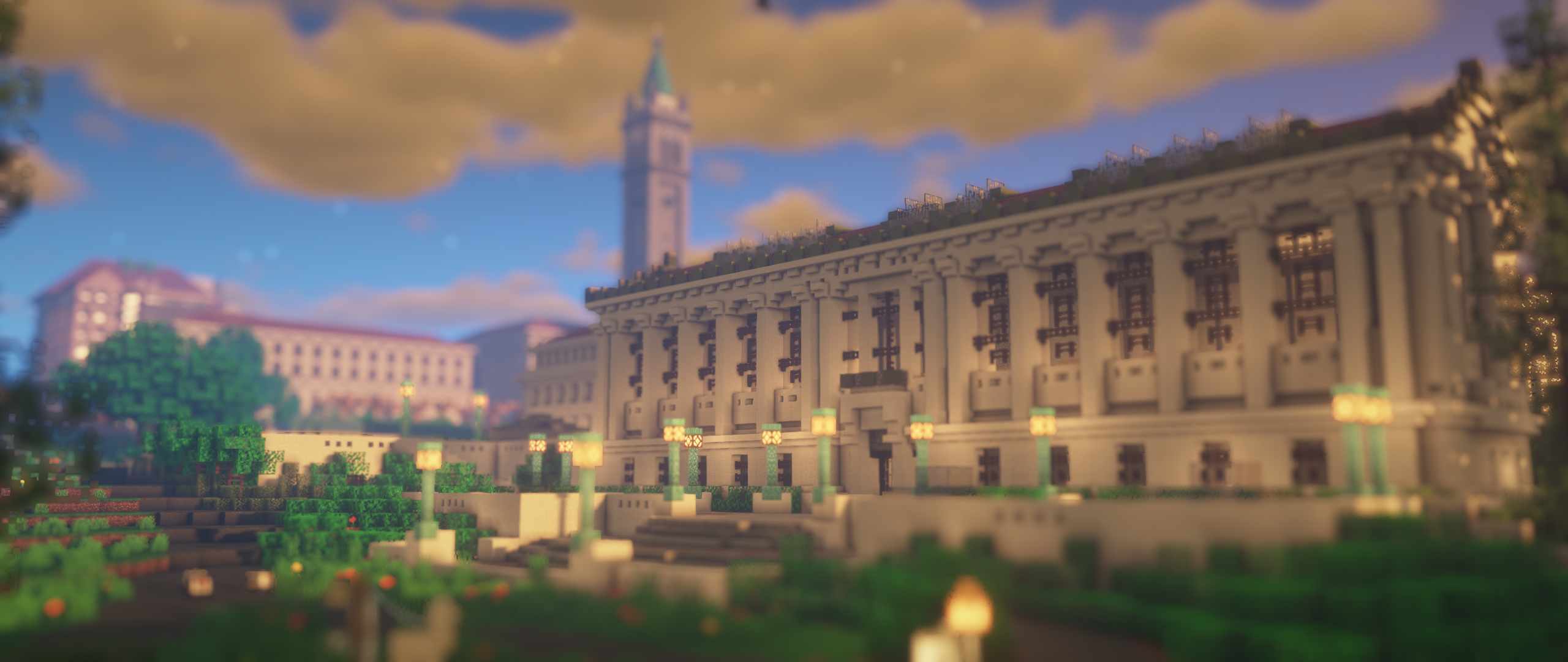
In-game screenshot of Blockeley's recreation of the Doe Memorial Library and Sather Tower

The project officially began on March 15, 2020, shortly after the university closed the campus and halted all in-person activities. Bjorn Lustic with the help of friend, Hunter Hall, converted a NASA topography scan of Berkeley into a Minecraft world using world editing tool. The process of recreating the California Memorial Stadium was completed much quicker than they had expected due to each member's familiarity of the stadium. Future building co-lead and commencement coordinator, Nicholas Pickett, recalls spending much time on the northwest entrance of the stadium as a University of California Marching Band member, while future executive director, Elliot Choi, recalled his time setting up card stunts in the student section as a freshman in the University of California Rally Committee. Choi also suggested the name change to Blockeley, a play on the city's name, Berkeley, to avoid potential legal conflicts with the use of the university's name.

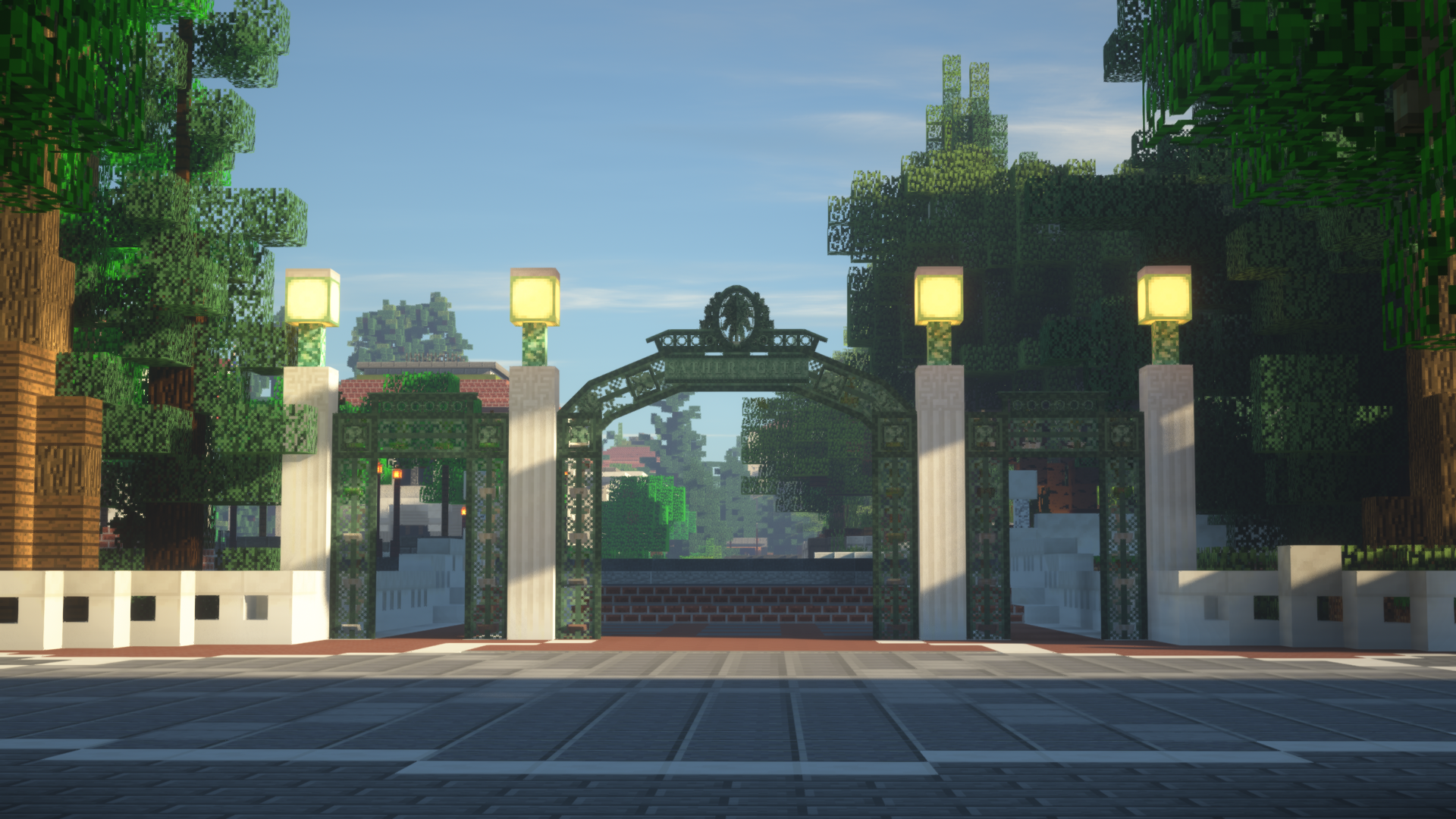
In-game screenshot of Blockeley's recreation of Sather Gate

=== Building the campus ===
Finishing the stadium in just about a week, the team moved on to building the surrounding areas such as the International House Berkeley using tools such as Google Earth to get approximate dimensions of the buildings. Merely being a team of about seven active builders working in their free time, there were no plans to complete the entire campus, until building team member, Evan Quan, posted a public call for builders on the popular "Overheard at UC Berkeley" Facebook page. Overnight, the team's Discord server grew from roughly 10 members to over a thousand with hundreds of students applying to build through a publicly shared Google Form.

== Blockeley Music Festival ==
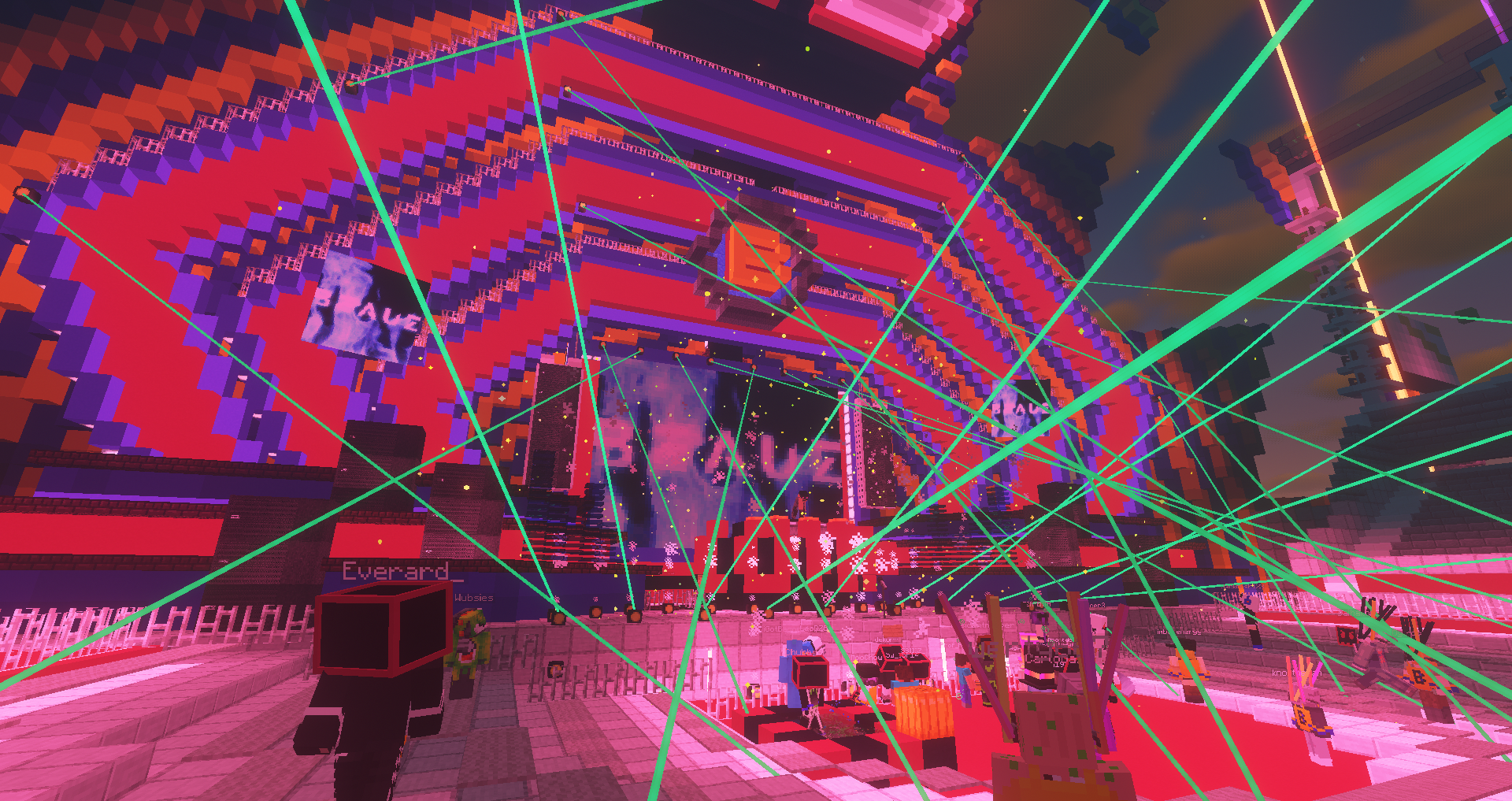
In-game screenshot of the music festival's main stage

Blockeley Music Festival was a two-day event. It started on May 16, 2020, and included guest performances by more than 60 artists including Cash Cash, Sam Feldt, and Vini Vici. The project began on May 1, when Elliot Choi proposed the idea to Johan Yang from Beauz. Together with their management team composed by Antonio Di Puorto, Luigi Porcari and Alessandro Dimitrio they took charge of the project and started what it would become a two-week marathon to deliver the full lineup and branding for the festival. The event was produced by the artist management agency KEYTEM and the New York-based OS Studios. The event was sponsored by Razer Inc., NVIDIA, Spin, NRG Esports and UC Berkeley's Cal Esports. Blockeley was the first music festival hosted on Minecraft.
