= Emily Gowers =

Scholar of Latin literature

Emily Gowers FBA
- Gowers in 2023
- Born: Emily Joanna Thomas; 27 September 1963 (age 63)

Academic background
- Education: Trinity College, Cambridge
- Thesis: The representation of food in Roman literature

Academic work
- Discipline: Classics
- Sub-discipline: Latin literature
- Institutions: Princeton University; University of Cambridge
- Notable works: The Loaded Table: Representations of Food in Roman Literature

Emily Joanna Gowers, FBA (née Thomas; born 27 September 1963) is a British classical scholar. She is Professor of Latin Literature at the University of Cambridge and a Fellow of St John's College, Cambridge. She is an expert on Horace, Augustan literature, and the history of food in the Roman world.

== Early life and education ==
Gowers attended Oxford High School. She studied Classics at Trinity College, Cambridge and was awarded her BA in 1985 followed by her MA in 1990. Gowers remained in Cambridge for her PhD with a dissertation entitled The representation of food in Roman literature in 1990 for which she was awarded the Hare Prize. She was a Junior Research Fellow at Trinity College, Cambridge from 1988 to 1991.

== Academic career ==
From 1991 to 1993, Gowers was a lecturer in Latin at University College, London followed by a period as an honorary research fellow at the same institution. In 1998 Gowers became an affiliated lecturer for the Faculty of Classics, University of Cambridge and then moved to Princeton University in 2000 as a lecturer in the Department of Classics. She returned to Cambridge as a lecturer in classics in 2002 and became a Senior Lecturer in 2009. Since 2013 Gowers has been a Reader in Latin Literature. Gowers was made Professor of Latin Literature in 2016.

Gowers's work on the representation of food in Latin literature stemmed from her PhD research into the subject. Her 1993 publication, The Loaded Table, was awarded the Premio Langhe Ceretto (per la cultura del cibo) in 1994 and translated into Italian in 1996. This work drew together evidence from literature for Roman diet and food culture.

Gowers's current work focuses primarily on the interpretation of Augustan literature, particularly the works of Horace. She was awarded a Leverhulme Major Research Fellowship (2014–16) for her project Maecenas: Transformations of an Augustan Patron.

In 2012 Gowers was a Visiting Professor and Distinguished Webster Lecturer, Stanford University and in 2014 she was a Visiting Professor for the Spring Semester at Princeton University. She delivered the 2013 Fowler Lecture (Jesus College, Oxford) on the subject "Maecenas and the Women". In 2013-14 Gowers was a guest speaker in the Classical Studies Department of McGill University. Gowers was the Sather Professor of Classical Literature at the University of California, Berkeley in 2022, the eleventh woman to be invited to hold the position. The role was founded by Jane K. Sather, with the first Sather Professor established in 1914. The position is annual, and involves teaching a course, delivering lectures on a specific topic, and publishing the lectures as a book.

In 2018 Gowers was appointed a Member of the Press Syndicate at Cambridge University Press, a role that contributes to the governance of the press. Gowers regularly reviews books for the Times Literary Supplement.

== Honours ==
Gowers was elected a member of the Academy of Europe in 2013. In July 2019, she was elected a Fellow of the British Academy (FBA), the United Kingdom's national academy for the humanities and social sciences.

== Personal life ==
In 1988, Gowers married Timothy Gowers, a mathematician and Cambridge academic: they divorced in 2007. Together they have three children.

== Selected publications ==
- Rome's Patron: The Lives and Afterlives of Maecenas, Princeton, February 2024, ISBN 978 0 691 193144, 463 pp.
- Tasting the Roman World in K. C. Rudolph, ed., Taste and the Ancient Senses (Routledge, Abingdon/New York, 2018, pp. 90–103)
- Under the Influence: Maecenas and Bacchus in Georgics 2 in P. Hardie, ed., Augustan Poetry and the Irrational (Oxford University Press, 2016, pp. 134–152)
- Girls will be boys and boys will be girls, or, what is the gender of Horace's Epodes? in P. Bather and C. Stocks, eds., Horace's Epodes: Contexts, Intertexts, and Reception (Oxford University Press, 2016, pp. 103–130)
- Horace Satires Book I (Cambridge Greek and Latin Texts series, Cambridge University Press, 2012) (rev. BMCR 2012.11.11)
- ed. with W. Fitzgerald Ennius Perennis: The Annals and Beyond (Cambridge Classical Journal Supplement 31, 2007)
- Fragments of Autobiography in Horace Satires I (Classical Antiquity 22.1, 2003, pp. 55–91)
- The Loaded Table: Representations of Food in Roman Literature (Oxford University Press, 1993) (paperback 1997, translated into Italian in 1996 as La pazza tavola, Società editrice internazionale di Torino)
