= James Gilliam =

James Gilliam may refer to:

- James Gilliam, also known as James Kelly (pirate) (died 1701), English pirate
- James Frank Gilliam (1915–1990), American classical scholar and historian of ancient Rome
