= Ben Foster =

Ben or Benjamin Foster may refer to:

- Ben Foster (actor) (born 1980), American actor
- Ben Foster (footballer) (born 1983), English goalkeeper
- Ben Foster (composer) (born 1977), British composer, orchestrator and conductor
- Ben Foster (director) (born 1984), American director, editor, producer and composer
- Ben Foster (sculptor) (born 1976 or 1977), New Zealand sculptor
- Ben Weasel (born Ben Foster, 1968), American author and member of punk rock band Screeching Weasel
- Benjamin Oliver Foster (1872–1938), American classical philologist and professor

== See also ==
- Benjamin Forster (disambiguation)
