= Peder Sather =

Norwegian-American banker (1810–1886)

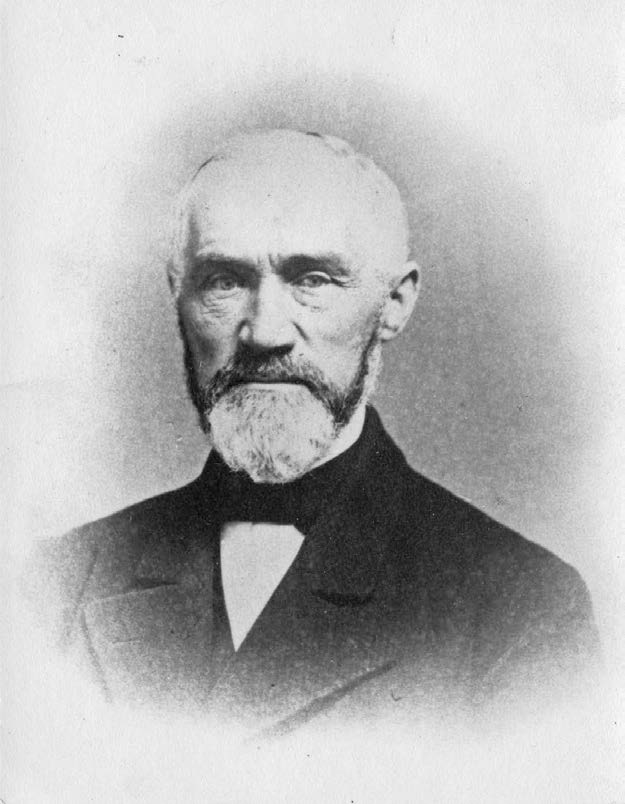
- Sather in 1865
- Born: September 25, 1810; Disenå, Norway
- Died: December 28, 1886 (aged 76); Oakland, California, US

Peder Sather (September 25, 1810 – December 28, 1886) was a Norwegian-born American banker who is best known for his legacy to the University of California, Berkeley. His widow, Jane K. Sather, donated money in his memory for two of the school's most famous landmarks: Sather Gate and Sather Tower are both California Historical Landmarks which are registered National Register of Historic Places.

== Biography ==
Peder Pedersen Sæther was born in Odalen, a traditional district in the county of Hedmark in eastern Norway, on the farm Nordstun Nedre Sæther (in what is now Sør-Odal Municipality). His parents were Peder Larsen and Mari Kristoffersdatter. Sæther was a fisherman before emigrating to New York City in about 1832. He entered the banking house of Drexel & Co. in Philadelphia and remained there until 1850.

Philadelphia banker Francis Martin Drexel offered to assist Peder Sather and his business partner Edward W. Church in establishing a bank in San Francisco. In 1850, Sather and Church moved to San Francisco and established the banking firm of Drexel, Sather & Church. From 1863, Peder Sather became the sole owner of the bank. He went on to become one of California’s richest men. Upon his death, the Sather and Church banking firm was absorbed by the Bank of California. Peder Sather was a trustee of the College of California, which would later become the University of California, Berkeley.

Peder Sather married a second time, in 1882, the widow Jane Krom Read (1824-1911). Four years later, after her husband's death she donated money for the construction of Sather Gate and Sather Tower at UC Berkeley, both of which are named in his honor. She also created an endowment for the Sather Professorship of Classical Literature at the University. Sather's banking firm continued until being acquired by the Bank of California in 1910.

== Peder Sather Symposium ==
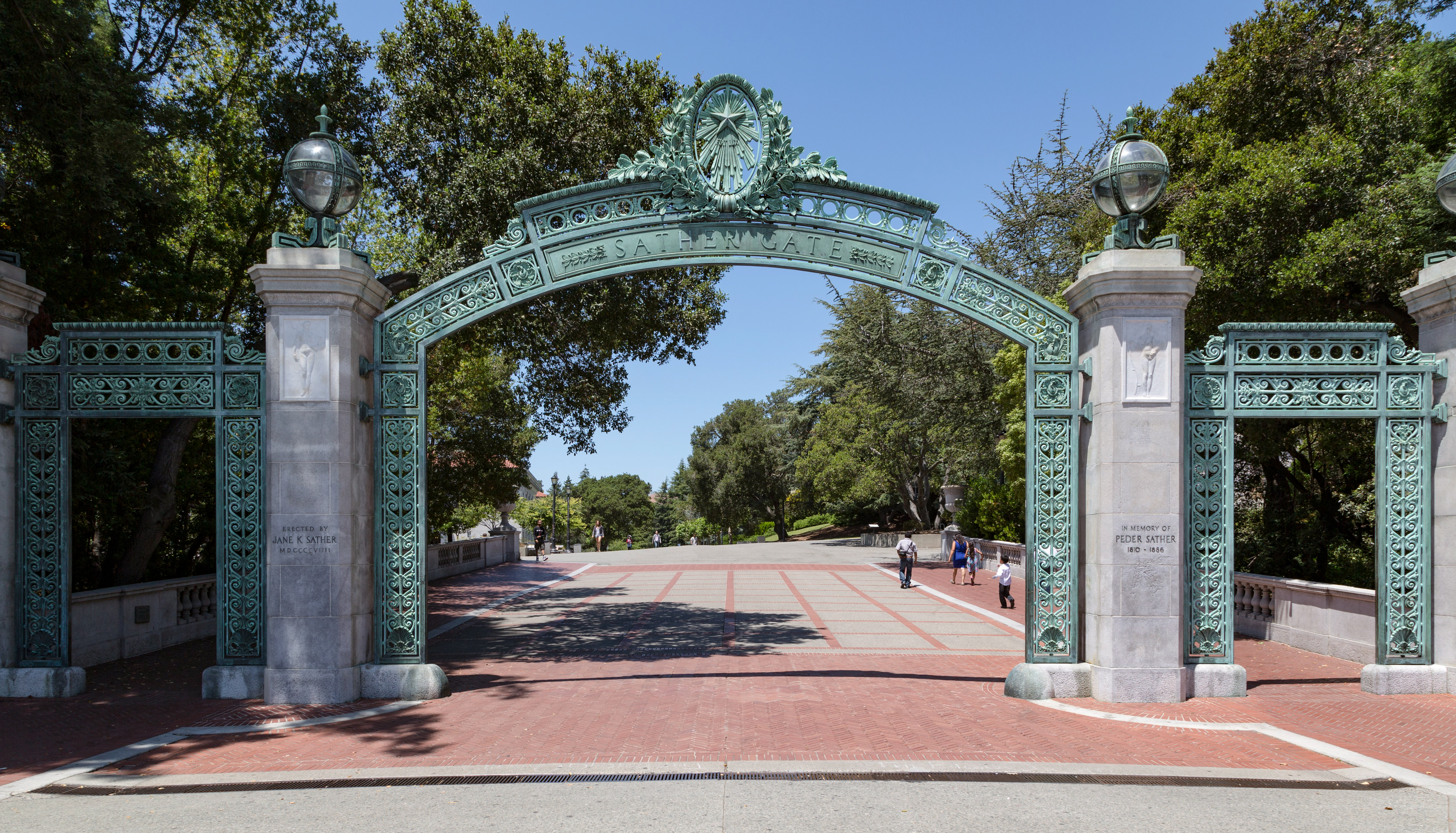
Sather Gate at UC Berkeley

The Peder Sather Symposium is a biennial event organized as a collaboration between the governments of Norway and Sweden and UC Berkeley. The stated goal of the symposium is to promote the understanding of political, economic, and cultural issues. It is designed to foster interdisciplinary discussion among scholars and policymakers on global and national issues of mutual concern.

== Sather Classical Lectures ==
The Sather Classical Lectures are an annual presentation by a selected scholar (the Sather Professor) on topics from the Greek and Roman world of antiquity. The lectures are usually about six in number, and are normally reprinted in book form. Among the distinguished appointees have been Lily Ross Taylor, Ronald Syme, William Bedell Stanford, John Myres, Brian Stock, and Herbert Weir Smyth.

== See also ==
- Arabic Case – Sunken British ocean liner
- Francis Bruguière – American photographer
- Margaret Van Alen Bruguiére – American socialite and art collector
- Peter Cooper Hewitt – American electrical engineer and inventor
- Sather – Object-oriented programming language similar to Eiffel
- Sather Tower – Bell tower in Berkeley, California, US

== Other sources ==
- Dow, Sterling (1965). Fifty Years of Sathers: The Sather Professorship of Classical Literature in the University of California, Berkeley. University of California Press.
- Sveen, Karin (2014). The Immigrant and the University. Peder Sather and Gold Rush California. University of California Press. ISBN 9780520276482.
