= Benjamin Forster =

Benjamin Forster may refer to:

- Benjamin Förster (born 1989), German footballer
- Benjamin Meggot Forster (1764–1829), English botanist and mycologist
- Benjamin Forster (antiquary) (1736–1805), English antiquary
- Ben Forster (actor) (born 1981), English actor

== See also ==
- Benjamin Forstner (1834–1897), American gunsmith, inventor, and dry goods merchant
- Ben Foster (disambiguation)
