= Helene P. Foley =

American classical philologist

Helene P. Foley is an American classical scholar. She is Professor of Classical Studies at Barnard College, Columbia University, and a member of the Institute for Research on Women, Gender and Sexuality at Columbia. She specialises in ancient Greek literature (epic poetry, tragedy, and comedy), women and gender in antiquity, and the reception of classical drama.

== Career ==
Foley took her first degree at Swarthmore College in 1964. She then received an MAT (Master of Arts in Teaching) in English (1966) and an MA in Classics (1967) from Yale University, and a PhD in Classical Philology from Harvard University (1975). Her doctoral thesis was entitled 'Ritual Irony in the Bacchae and Other Late Euripidean Plays'. She taught at Swarthmore until 1979, when she moved to Barnard College, Columbia University. In 1998 she was the President of the American Philological Association (now the Society for Classical Studies). In Spring 2008 she was the 94th Sather Professor of Classical Literature at the University of California, Berkeley; her Sather Lectures focused on the restaging of Greek tragedies in America, and the ways in which modern productions of these plays explored themes of contemporary concern including slavery, race, the status of women, immigration, and identity. These lectures were later published as Reimagining Greek Tragedy on the American Stage (2012). She has also been Visiting Professor at Dartmouth College and New York University.

She is currently finishing a book on Euripides' Hecuba, coordinating an issue of the Proceedings of the Modern Language Association with Jean Howard on Tragedy, and working on tragic choruses. A conference, 'Female Agents: Gender, Drama, Reception, Performance', will be held in her honour 31 March-1 April 2023 at Barnard College.

== Selected publications ==
- Reflections of Women in Antiquity London: Routledge, 1981.
- The Homeric Hymn to Demeter. Princeton: Princeton University Press, 1994.
- Women in the Classical World: Image and Text (ed., with Elaine Fantham, N. B. Kampen and S. B. Pomeroy). Oxford: Oxford University Press, 1994.
- Ritual Irony: Poetry and Sacrifice in Euripides. Ithaca and London: Cornell University Press, 1985.
- Female Acts in Greek Tragedy Princeton: Princeton University Press, 2001.
- Visualizing the Tragic: Drama, Myth, and Ritual in Greek Art and Literature. Essays in Honour of Froma Zeitlin (ed., with Chris Kraus, Simon Goldhill and Jas Elsner). Oxford: Oxford University Press, 2007.
- Antigone on the Contemporary World Stage (ed., with Erin B. Mee). Oxford: Oxford University Press, 2011.
- Reimagining Greek Tragedy on the American Stage. Berkeley and Los Angeles: University of California Press, 2012.
