= Gilbert Norwood =

British classical scholar (1880–1954)

Gilbert Norwood FRSC
- Born: 23 November 1880; Sheffield, South Yorkshire, England
- Died: 18 October 1954 (aged 73); Toronto, Ontario, Canada

Academic background
- Education: St John's College, Cambridge; University of Wales
- Academic advisors: John Edwin Sandys, Richard Claverhouse Jebb

Gilbert Norwood FRSC (23 November 1880, Ecclesall Bierlow, Sheffield – 18 October 1954, Toronto) was a British classical philologist and essayist.

== Life ==
Gilbert Norwood studied at St John's College of Cambridge University with John Edwin Sandys and Richard Claverhouse Jebb. After completing his Bachelor's degree (1903), he was employed as an Assistant Lecturer in Classics at the University of Manchester. He also completed his master's at Cambridge (1906) and was a Fellow at St. John's College from 1906 to 1909.

In 1908, Norwood was awarded a Professorship at University College in Cardiff (Professor of Greek). He stayed there for almost twenty years until 1926 when he was offered a professorship at University College in Toronto (Canada).

Norwood worked in Toronto until the end of his life. In 1928 he was appointed Professor of Classics and Director of Classical Studies. In the following years he received various international awards: in 1933 he received his doctorate from the University of Wales (Cardiff), in 1943 he was elected a member of the Royal Society of Canada, and in 1943/1944 he was invited to the University of California, Berkeley as Sather Professor, in 1944/1945 he was visiting professor at the University of Chicago. Norwood retired in 1951.

Norwood's research focus was the ancient stage poetry, especially the Greek tragedy (Euripides) and comedy (Aristophanes) as well as the Roman comedy (Plautus and Terence). He published English translations of several pieces, monographic overviews of the genres and numerous essays on individual problems.

== Works ==
- The Riddle of the Bacchae. Manchester/London 1908.
- Greek Tragedy. London/Boston 1920. 4th, revised ed. London/Boston 1948.
- Euripides and Shaw, with other essays. London/Boston 1921.
- The Art of Terence. Oxford 1923.
- The Writers of Greece. London 1925.
- The Wooden Man and other stories and essays. New York 1926.
- Greek Comedy. London 1931. Reprinted Boston 1932, 1950.
- Spoken in Jest. London 1938.
- The Syntax of the Latin Gerund and Gerundive. Toronto 1932.
- Plautus and Terence. New York/London 1932.
- Pindar. Berkeley 1945 (Sather Lectures 19).
- Essays on Euripidean Drama. Berkeley/Los Angeles 1954.
