= Cal Falcons =

Streaming webcam in Berkeley, California

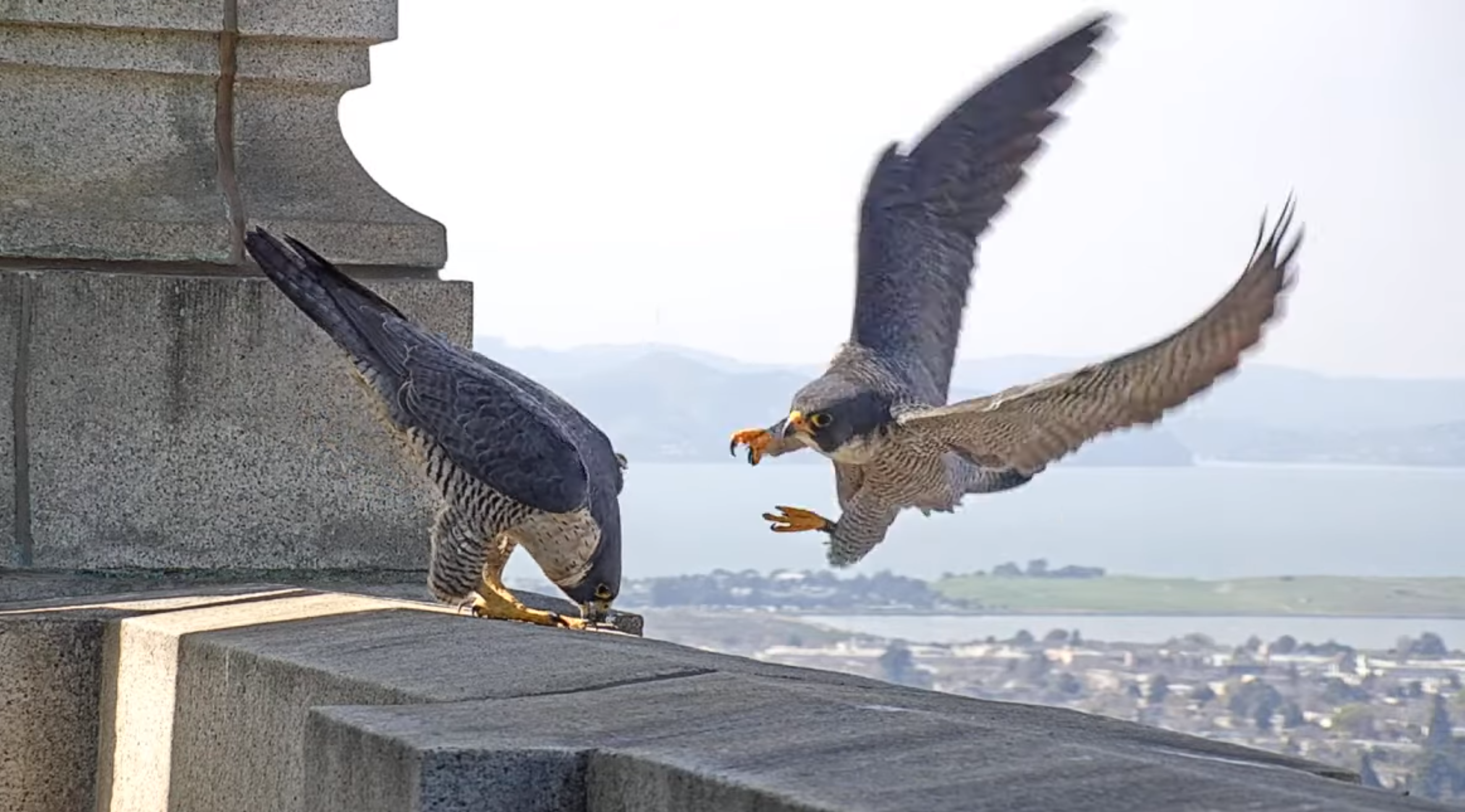
Peregrine Falcons nesting at University of California, Berkeley

Cal Falcons is a website and social media community featuring three live streaming webcams trained on a peregrine falcon nest site atop Sather Tower at the University of California, Berkeley. Cal Falcons is known for its extensive social media presence and following. The live stream runs continuously throughout the year, recording all facets of the falcon lifecycle, including courtship, breeding, and raising young. The site launched with two cameras in January 2019.

== Nest site ==
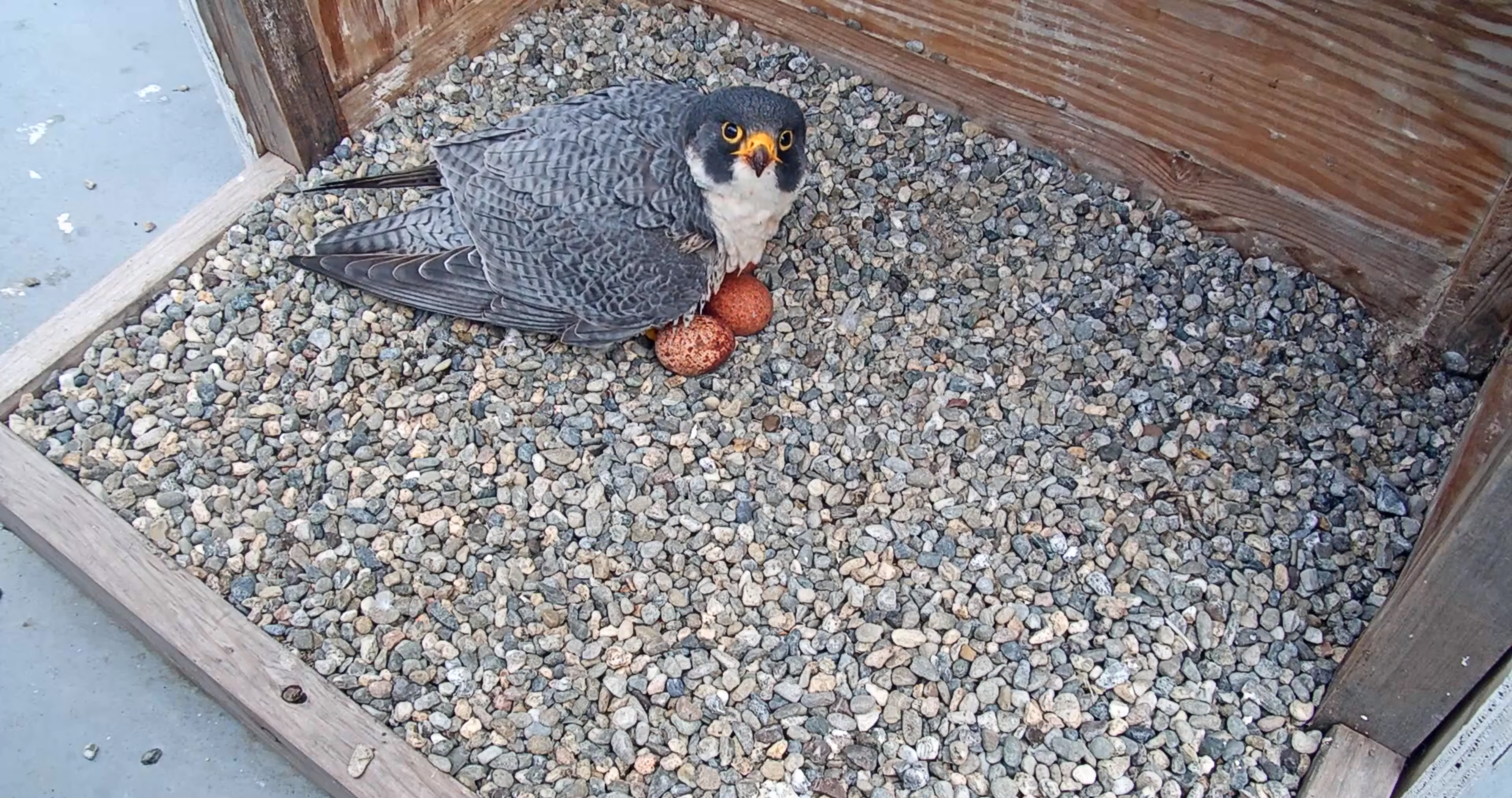
Grinnell incubates eggs in the nest box atop Sather Tower at the University of California, Berkeley

Peregrine falcons initially established a territory and nest at Sather Tower in spring of 2017. Initially, the falcon pair laid their eggs on a broken sandbag on the upper balcony of Sather Tower, which was replaced by researchers with a nest box after scientists found that eggs were rolling off the sandbag. In the wild, falcons nest on rocky ledges and cliff faces, so the gravel-filled nest box was designed to mimic those conditions. A permanent wooden nest box was installed in 2018, prior to the pair's second breeding season. Two cameras were installed prior to the 2019 nesting season, allowing continual remote viewing of the nest area.

== Breeding pair ==
The breeding pair that established the territory in 2017 were named Annie and Grinnell as part of a crowdfunding campaign to purchase the cameras. Annie, the female, was named after Annie Montague Alexander, a naturalist who founded the University of California Museum of Paleontology and Museum of Vertebrate Zoology. Grinnell, the male, was named after Joseph Grinnell, the first director of the Museum of Vertebrate Zoology.

On October 31, 2021, Grinnell was injured in a territorial battle with another falcon. He was taken to the Lindsay Wildlife Experience for evaluation and rehabilitation. Grinnell was diagnosed with several injuries, including puncture wounds, a wing injury, and a damaged beak. During the period Grinnell was in the hospital, an unknown male began to court Annie. Grinnell was released from care on November 17, 2021 and subsequently reclaimed the territory from the unknown male. During the 2022 breeding season, Annie disappeared for a week prior to laying eggs, leading to speculation that she had been injured, killed, or driven away from the territory, as multiple unknown female birds were seen courting Grinnell. After her return, Annie laid two eggs with Grinnell. On March 31, 2022, Grinnell was found dead on a road in downtown Berkeley. The cause of death was not known, but he may have been hit by a car after being attacked by a rival falcon. On April 1, 2022, Annie was courted by a new male who quickly established a pair bond with her, leading to a third egg being laid and the entire clutch being incubated by both Annie and the new male. Following a public vote, the new male was named Alden, after Alden Miller, a UC Berkeley ornithologist who succeeded Joseph Grinnell as director of the Museum of Vertebrate Zoology.

In late 2022, Alden disappeared and was replaced by Lou, named after Louise Kellogg, who was the best friend of Annie Alexander. He was nicknamed "Cheeto-feet" because of his bright orange feet. The pair raised a clutch of three chicks in the 2023 breeding season, and both Annie and Lou could be seen on the campus in the months following the chicks' fledging in July.

In early 2024, Lou disappeared, and a few weeks later was replaced by Archie, named after UC Berkeley alumnus Archie Williams, winner of the Olympic Gold in the 400 meter run in the 1936 Olympics and later becoming an Air Force Colonel. The pair raised a clutch of four chicks together in the 2024 breeding season.

== Nesting history ==
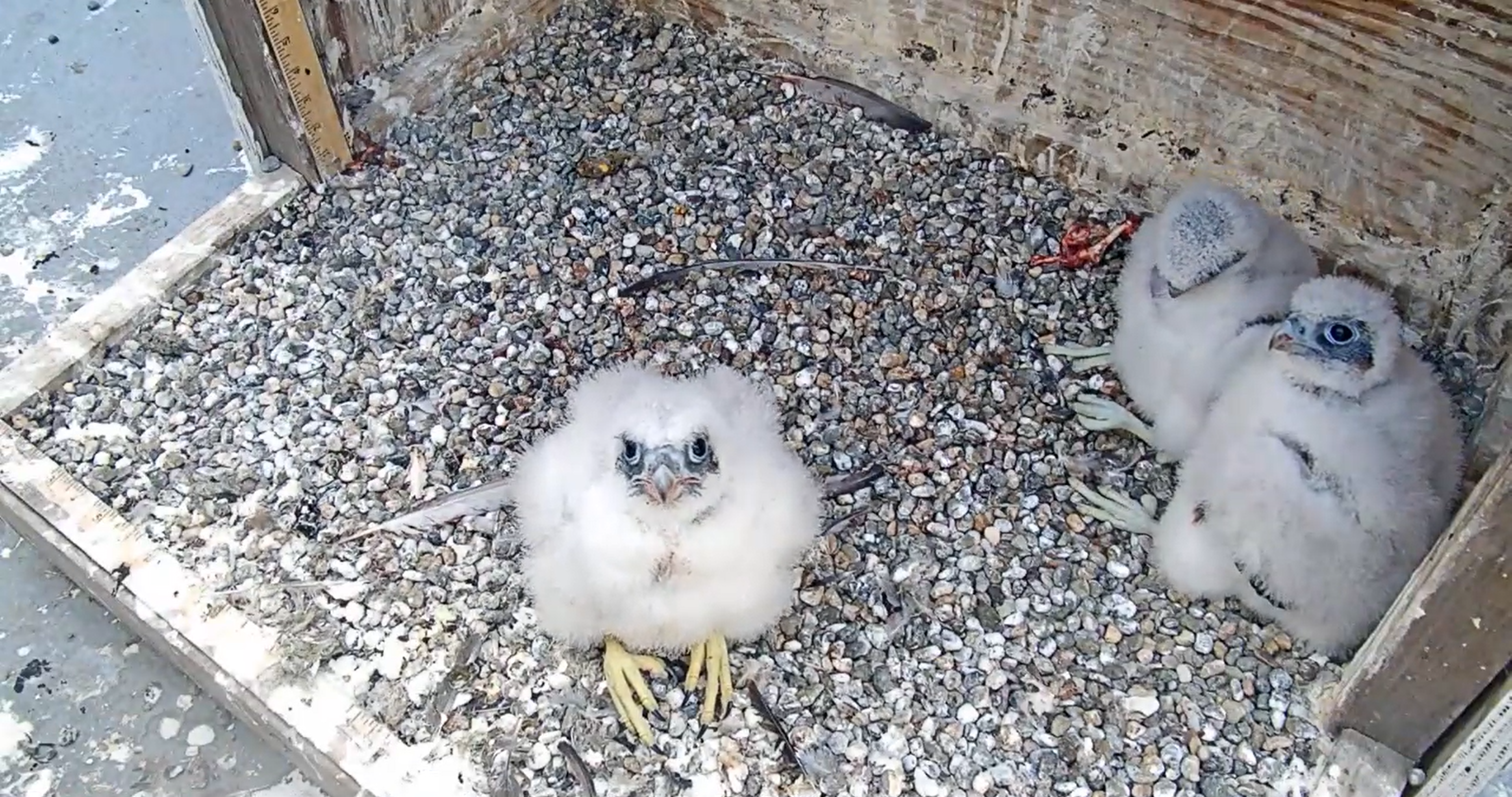
Three juvenile peregrine falcons in their nest box atop Sather Tower at the University of California, Berkeley

Between 2017 and 2021, Annie and Grinnell raised a total of thirteen chicks, twelve of which successfully fledged. One, named Lux, died shortly after leaving the nest site by hitting a window. Prior to Grinnell's death in 2022, Annie also laid two more eggs, assumed to be fathered by Grinnell. As of April 2022, Annie had also laid an additional egg of unknown parentage. The chicks, eventually named Grinnell Jr. and Lindsay, grew up, but two months after fledging, Lindsay got killed by red-shouldered hawks.

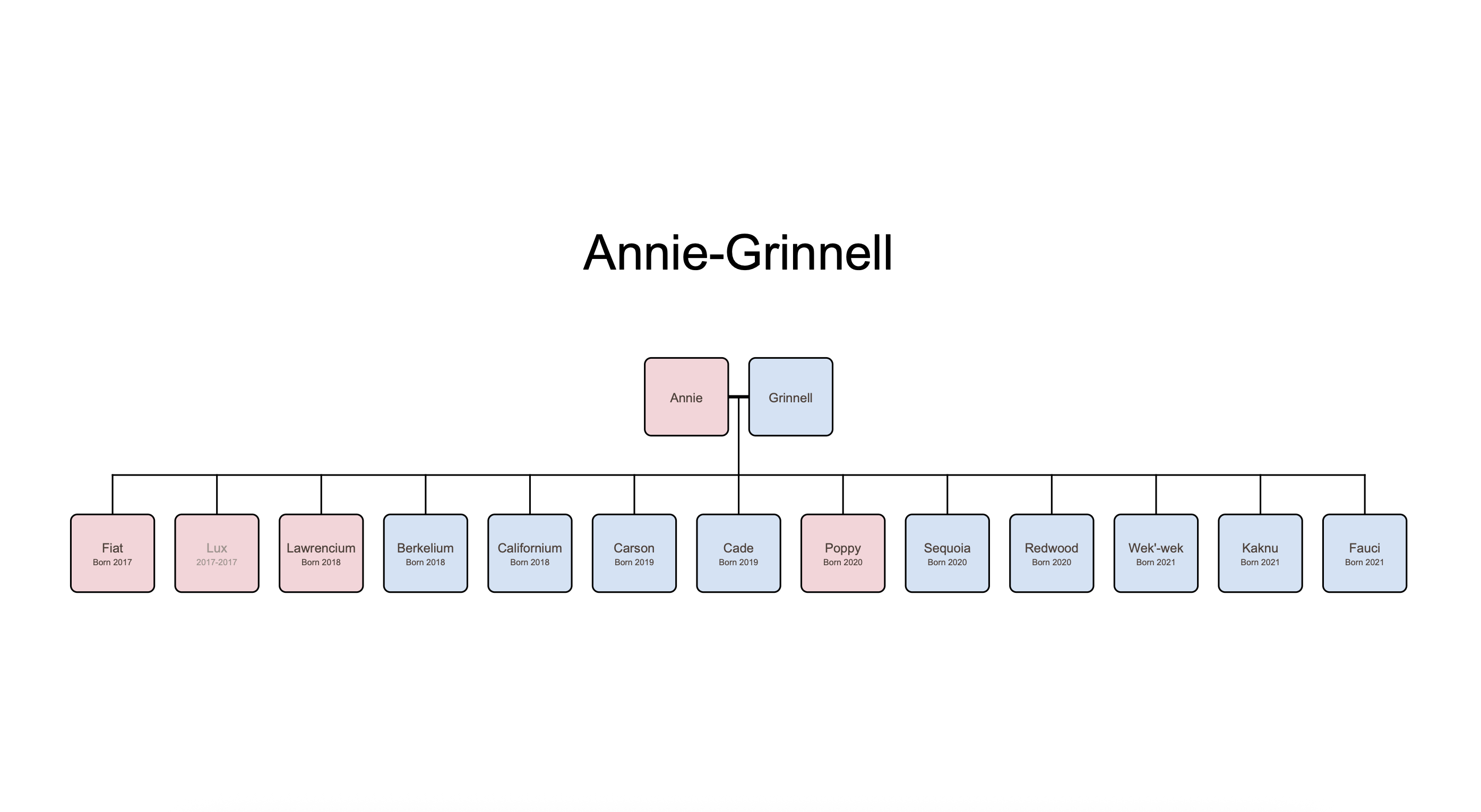
The family tree of Annie and Grinnell

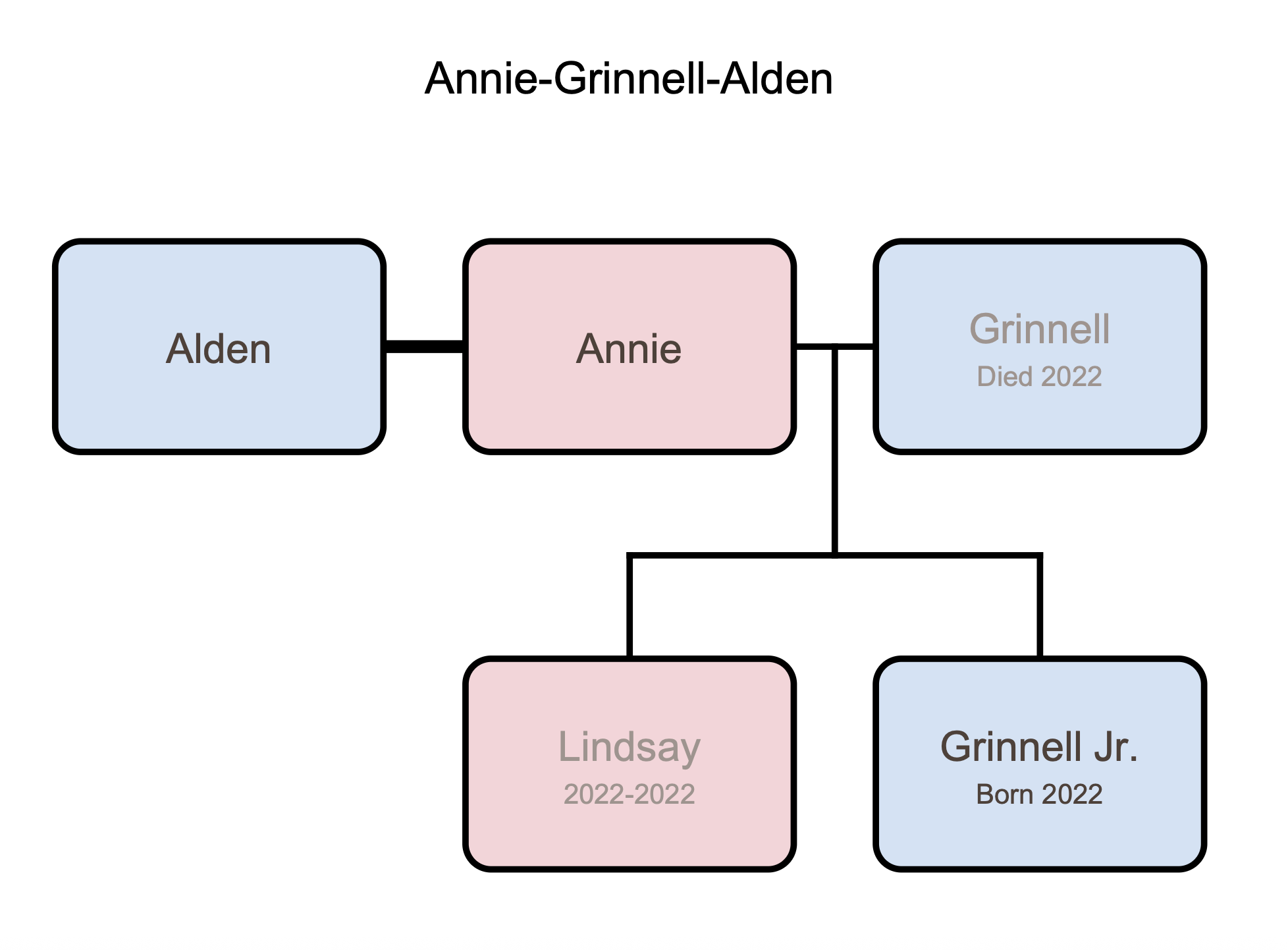
The family tree of Annie, Grinnell, and Alden

Between 2023 and 2024, Annie raised a total of seven more chicks with her new mates: three with Lou and four with Archie. All seven chicks fledged, but Equinox - nicknamed "Nox" by fans - was found on July 5, 2024 in the Berkeley Marina with a broken wing. He was brought to the UC Davis Veterinary Hospital to be treated and was released on October 19. He was found again three days later in Richmond, showing signs of being severely anemic and emaciated, and succumbed to pneumonia on October 23.

Each year, Cal Falcons held a naming contest for the season's chicks largely via social media. Previous names have included Berkeley's motto (Fiat/Lux), chemical elements discovered at UC Berkeley, conservationists critical to the peregrine falcon's recovery, California state plants, falcon figures in Native American tradition, famous scientists, and Grinnell-related topics. The 2023 and 2024 chicks both had names suggested by and voted on by the public through social media. Two of the chicks' names in 2023 were suggested by children through a partnership with the Berkeley Public Library, and the chicks in 2024 were named with an Earth Day and celestial event theme in mind.

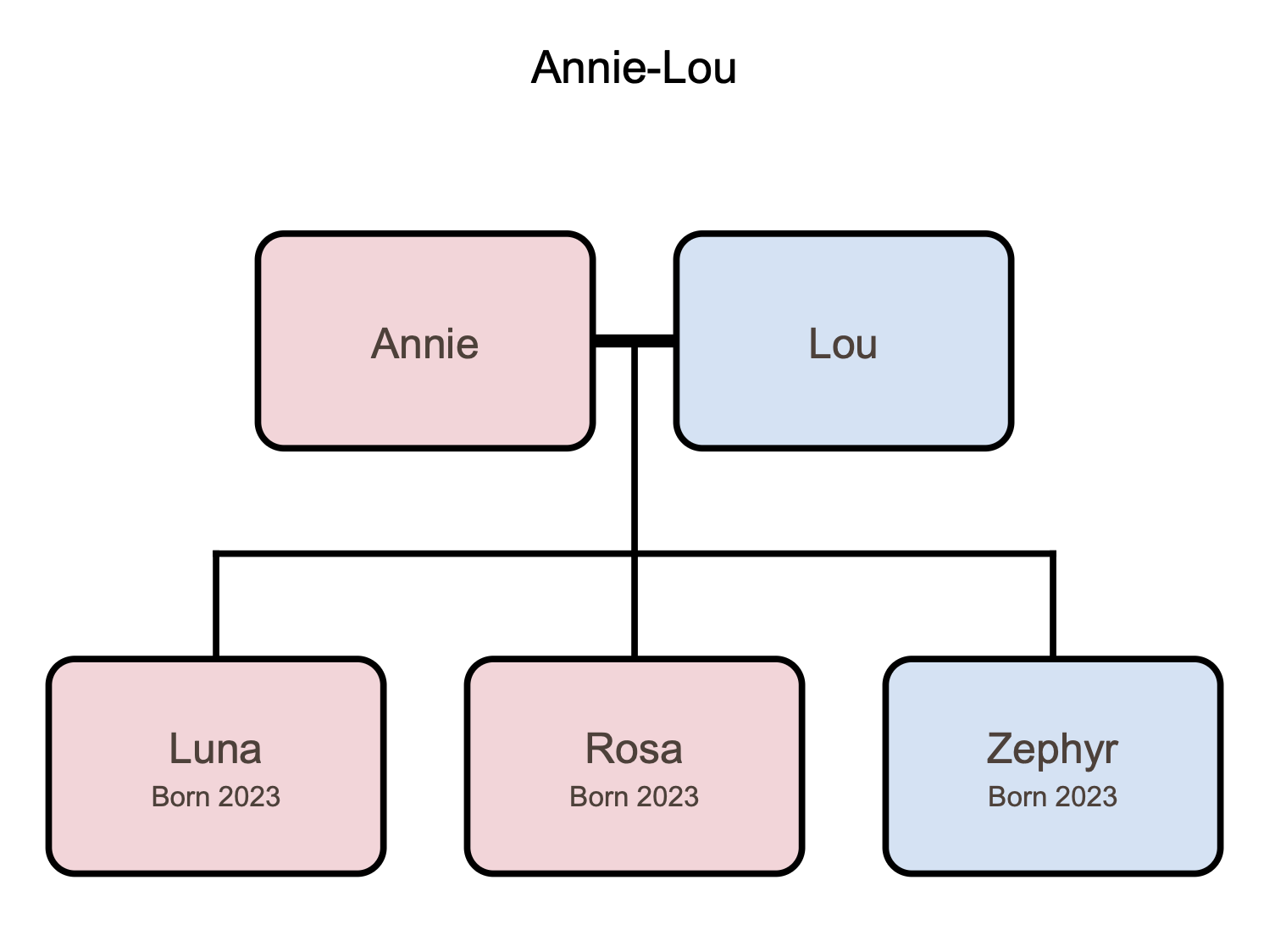
The family tree of Annie and Lou

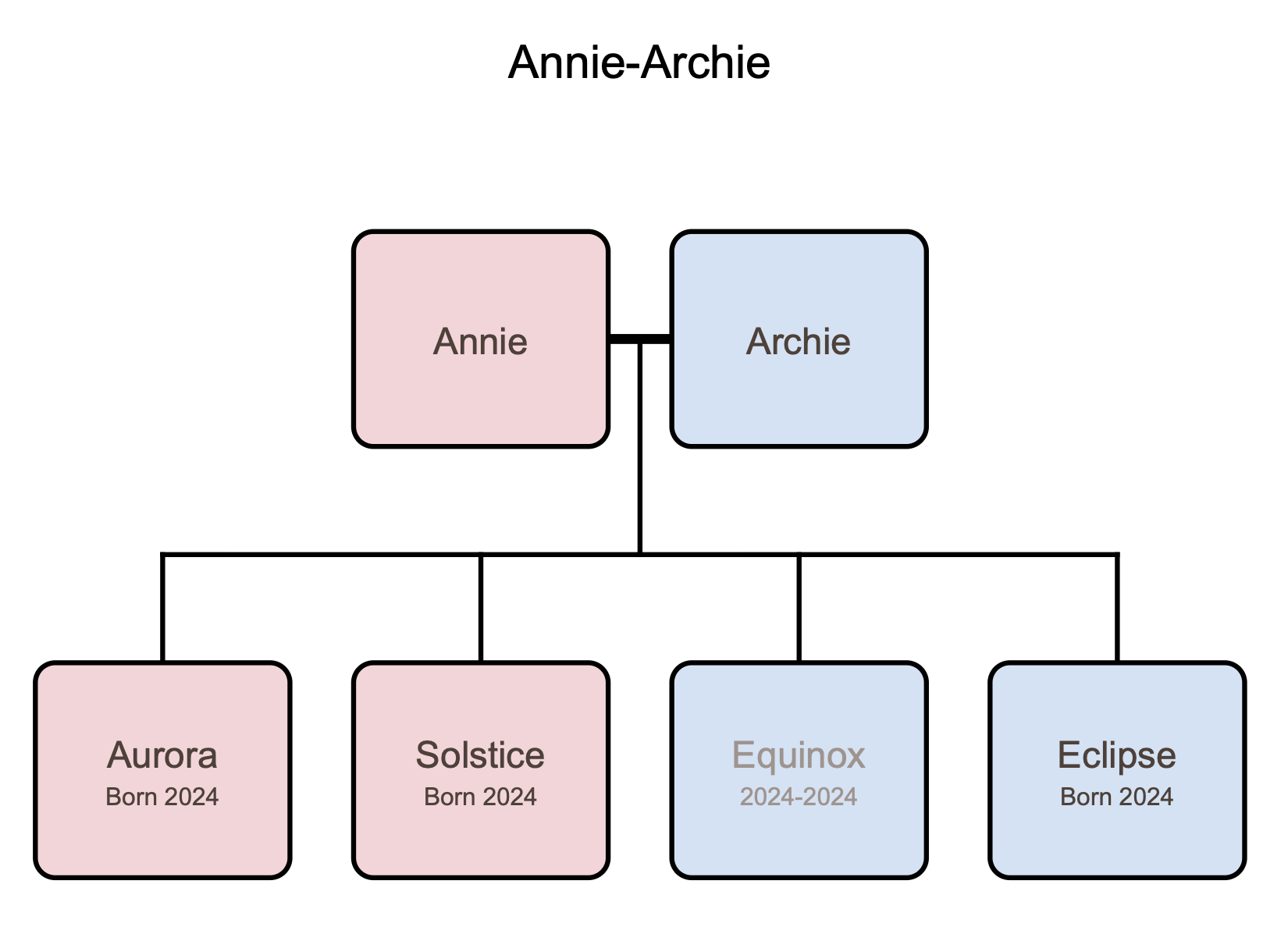
The family tree of Annie and Archie

Two of the chicks fledged from UC Berkeley, a female named Lawrencium (aka Larry) and a male named Sequoia, are known to have established territories in the San Francisco Bay Area. However, after Sequoia's mate succumbed to avian flu, he disappeared. Lawrencium has successfully raised several broods of chicks on Alcatraz Island. They had three chicks in 2023, and four chicks in 2024.

== Disappearance ==
Towards the beginning of January 2025, Annie and Archie disappeared, with fans voicing concerns over the spread of avian flu. This hypothesis was supported by the Cal Falcons themselves in a social media post after the pair had not been seen on campus for about two months. This followed reports of declining numbers of Peregrine Falcons in the United States since the outbreak of the strain in 2022. Even with no falcons currently residing at the top of Sather Tower, the webcams that were installed are still being maintained and utilized.
