= Denis Feeney =

New Zealand-born classicist and Latinist

- Born: 16 October 1955 (age 71); New Zealand
- Occupations: Classicist; Latinist
- Title: Giger Professor of Latin, Emeritus
- Awards: Sather Professorship of Classical Literature (2004); Guggenheim Fellowship (2009); Fellow of the British Academy (2016)

Academic background
- Education: University of Auckland (BA, MA, MA); University of Oxford (DPhil)
- Doctoral advisor: R. G. M. Nisbet

Academic work
- Discipline: Classics
- Sub-discipline: Latin literature; Roman religion; Roman conceptions of time
- Institutions: University of Oxford; University of Wisconsin–Madison; Princeton University
- Notable works: The Gods in Epic (1991); Caesar's Calendar (2007); Beyond Greek (2016)

Denis C. Feeney FBA (born 16 October 1955) is a New Zealand-born classicist and the Giger Professor of Latin, Emeritus, at Princeton University. A scholar of Latin literature and Roman culture, he is known for four monographs that address, in turn, the representation of the gods in classical epic, the relationship between literature and religion at Rome, Roman conceptions of time, and the origins of Latin literature. He served as president of the American Philological Association in 2013–14, and presided over the organization's renaming as the Society for Classical Studies. At the time of his retirement, colleagues in Princeton's Department of Classics described Feeney as "the preeminent Latinist of his generation."

== Early life and education ==
Feeney was born on 16 October 1955 in New Zealand. He entered the University of Auckland intending to major in French, but turned to classics, graduating with a Bachelor of Arts in 1974. He remained at Auckland for two further degrees, taking a Master of Arts in Latin with first-class honours in 1975—supported by a University Grants Committee Postgraduate Overseas Scholarship—and a Master of Arts in Greek, also with first-class honours, in 1976. He spent the first half of 1977 as a junior lecturer in classics at Auckland.

Later in 1977, he moved to the University of Oxford, where he completed a DPhil in 1982 with a commentary on the first book of the Punica of Silius Italicus, supervised by R. G. M. Nisbet, then Corpus Christi Professor of Latin. During his doctoral years he also held college lectureships in classics at Balliol College (1978–79) and Merton College (1979–82).

== Academic career ==
From 1982 to 1983, Feeney was a junior fellow of the Harvard University Society of Fellows. He then held a succession of posts on both sides of the Atlantic: college fellow and director of studies in classics at Magdalene College, Cambridge (1983–85); lecturer in classics at the University of Edinburgh (1985–88); assistant professor at the University of Wisconsin–Madison (1988–90); Professor of Latin at the University of Bristol (1990–92); associate professor and then professor at Wisconsin–Madison (1992–96); and fellow and tutor in classical languages and literature at New College, Oxford (1996–2000).

In 2000, Feeney joined Princeton University as the Giger Professor of Latin. He was subsequently offered the two most senior chairs of Latin in Britain—the Corpus Christi Professorship of Latin at Oxford and the Kennedy Professorship of Latin at Cambridge—in the same year, an offer colleagues described as an unprecedented distinction, but declined both to remain at Princeton.

At Princeton, Feeney served as director of graduate studies for the classics department in 2002–03, overseeing a reorganization of the graduate program that reduced its examination burden and introduced a systematic mentoring system and a dissertation workshop. He also chaired the department from 2003 to 2009. From 2014 to 2016 he chaired Princeton's Council of the Humanities, where he also directed the Program in Humanistic Studies and the Stewart Seminars in Religion. Colleagues noted that Feeney lectured without a script, both in the classroom and at academic conferences, delivering structured arguments extemporaneously, and have described him as unusually sought after as a supervisor by graduate and undergraduate students alike.

Feeney retired from teaching at the end of 2021 and returned to England; his transfer to emeritus status was made effective by the Princeton Board of Trustees on 1 July 2022.

== Research ==
Feeney's work spans Latin prose and verse, Roman religion, and Roman history. A recurring preoccupation across his career has been the relationship between fiction and representation, pursued with a working knowledge of contemporary literary theory, anthropology, and comparative religion. The British Academy summarizes his fields as Roman history and the Latin literature of the Republic and early Principate, with particular interests in time, religion, and the institutions of literary culture. He has written especially on Catullus, Virgil, Horace, and Ovid.

=== The Gods in Epic ===
Feeney's first book, The Gods in Epic: Poets and Critics of the Classical Tradition (Oxford University Press, 1991), examined how the gods are represented in classical, and especially Latin, epic, focusing on the problems of fiction that arise in negotiating the boundary between Roman religious practice and epic modes of representation. Rather than treating the divine apparatus of epic as inherited machinery, Feeney used each poet's handling of the gods to situate that poet within an intellectual and historical context, exploring the poetry of Apollonius of Rhodes, Naevius and Ennius, Virgil, Ovid, Lucan, Silius Italicus, Valerius Flaccus, and Statius. He paired these readings with a long opening chapter on the ancient critics, on the grounds that their interpretive conventions and their theories of fiction and genre offer access to how epic's original audiences understood the truth-value of poetic fiction and the kind of belief it generates. Among the book's arguments was that Ovid's treatment of Augustus's appropriation of the gods paved the way for Lucan's exclusion of the gods from the Bellum Civile, the divine characters of Naevius, Ennius, and Virgil having ceased to be available as vehicles of communal meaning once they had become creatures of the princeps.

The Gods in Epic has been heralded as a major intervention. Philip Hardie called it a landmark in the study of Latin epic and a work of dazzling scholarship and criticism, while a notice in Choice observed that it was the first study to treat the classical literary tradition as a whole together with the critical apparatus that formed part of that tradition. Reviewing it for the Bryn Mawr Classical Review, Julia Haig Gaisser judged it a stunning synthesis of literary and intellectual history and essential reading for anyone interested in epic after Homer. In electing Feeney to membership in 2016, the American Academy of Arts and Sciences credited his books and essays on Latin poetry and Roman culture with a leading role in shaping contemporary thinking about how traditional religious belief informed Roman poetry and how that literature may in turn have informed belief and practice.

=== Literature and Religion at Rome ===
Together with Latinist Stephen Hinds, whom he met while at Cambridge, Feeney co-edited the Cambridge University Press series Roman Literature and its Contexts, launched in 1993, which aimed to connect the prevailing modes of studying Roman literature with current work elsewhere in classics and the wider humanities. His own contribution to the series, Literature and Religion at Rome: Cultures, Contexts, and Beliefs (1998), was a systematic enquiry into Roman religion and its reception in modern scholarship, framed as a dialogue between the ways scholars tend to read Greek and Roman culture. Though brief, it has been credited with a deep influence on subsequent research on Roman religion. Writing in 2022, the historian Clifford Ando recalled it as the first of Feeney's works he had read and judged it, a quarter-century later, to be among the very finest books on Roman religion.

=== Caesar's Calendar ===
In the spring of 2024, Feeney delivered the Sather Classical Lectures at the University of California, Berkeley, taking as his subject Roman conceptions of time. The resulting book, Caesar's Calendar: Ancient Time and the Beginnings of History (University of California Press, 2007), used time as a way to explore questions central to Roman thought: Rome's place in the past and in the contemporary Mediterranean world, its sense of its empire's future, and the relationship of the individual to the rhythms of the state and the natural world. It addressed synchronism, the distinction between mythical and historical time, and calendrical time.

=== Beyond Greek ===
Beyond Greek: The Beginnings of Latin Literature (Harvard University Press, 2016) argues that the emergence of a literature in Latin was neither natural nor inevitable but highly contingent. Feeney locates its origin in Roman stage productions that constituted, in effect, the first sustained translations of Greek literary texts into another language—a practice he characterizes as unusual, if not unprecedented, in the ancient Mediterranean—and traces how the Romans took over Greek forms of tragedy, comedy, and epic and made them their own. The book had been announced under the working title Roman Horizons.

Reviewing it in the Times Literary Supplement, Emily Wilson credited Feeney with placing Roman literary history in a large comparative frame and with making long-standing questions about Rome's Hellenization feel newly urgent. Writing in the London Review of Books, T. P. Wiseman praised Feeney's combination of erudition and readability while dissenting from his central thesis, arguing that Latin poets and playwrights had existed before Livius Andronicus and that the earliest Latin plays are better understood as original works than as translations of classic texts. The book was named a History Today Book of the Year and a Choice Outstanding Academic Title.

=== Collected papers and later work ===
In 2021 Cambridge University Press published Feeney's collected papers in two volumes as Explorations in Latin Literature, gathering nearly all of his articles and book chapters, with a foreword by Stephen Hinds and a bibliography of his published work. Volume 1 covers epic, historiography, and religion; Volume 2 covers elegy, lyric, and other topics, with ancient literary criticism and the technology of the book as recurrent themes. Princeton colleagues noted that the collection required almost no winnowing for repetition, each piece having done something distinct.

Also in 2021, Feeney and the Germanist Joel B. Lande co-edited How Literatures Begin: A Global History (Princeton University Press), a comparative volume in which seventeen contributors examine the practices, technologies, institutions, and individuals behind the emergence of literary traditions from Asia, Europe, Africa, and the Americas. The volume grew from the editors' discovery, on first meeting in 2011, that they were separately working on the origins of Latin and German literature and that early Roman comedy, and Plautus in particular, had been pivotal to both.

== Professional service ==
Feeney was elected as president of the American Philological Association for 2013–14. During his term the association's board voted to recommend changing its name to the Society for Classical Studies, retaining "Founded in 1869 as the American Philological Association" as a permanent subtitle, and put the question to a membership vote. In a message to members setting out the case for the change, Feeney traced the history of the term "philology," noting that the association had been founded as an umbrella body for students of language broadly conceived, and that as sub-groups such as the Modern Language Association and the Linguistic Society of America split off, classicists had been left as the custodians of a label far narrower in practice than in origin. He argued that the older name had become an impediment as the organization took on broader academic, professional, and public roles, and that "Classics" and "Classical" were more recognizable to colleagues, students, and the public—while acknowledging his own pride in and attachment to the original name.

Feeney also served on the editorial board of Classical Philology from 1994 and on that of the Journal of Roman Studies from 1991 to 2000, acting as its review editor from 1997 to 2000.

== Honours and awards ==
- Sather Professor of Classical Literature, University of California, Berkeley (spring 2004)
- Guggenheim Fellowship (2009)
- American Council of Learned Societies Fellowship (2010)
- Visiting Fellow Commoner, Trinity College, Cambridge (2010)
- Howard T. Behrman Award for Distinguished Achievement in the Humanities, Princeton University (2011)
- President, American Philological Association (2013–14)
- Visiting Fellow, Corpus Christi College, Oxford (2013–14)
- Fellow, American Academy of Arts and Sciences (2016)
- Corresponding Fellow, British Academy (2016)
- Honorary Fellow, St Anne's College, Oxford (2021)

Feeney has also given a number of named lectures, including the Ronald Syme Memorial Lecture at Victoria University of Wellington, the Don Fowler Memorial Lecture at Oxford, and the A. E. Housman Lecture at University College London.

== Selected publications ==
=== Books ===
- The Gods in Epic: Poets and Critics of the Classical Tradition. Oxford: Oxford University Press, 1991.
- Literature and Religion at Rome: Cultures, Contexts, and Beliefs. Cambridge: Cambridge University Press, 1998.
- Caesar's Calendar: Ancient Time and the Beginnings of History. Sather Classical Lectures 65. Berkeley: University of California Press, 2007.
- Beyond Greek: The Beginnings of Latin Literature. Cambridge, MA: Harvard University Press, 2016.
- Explorations in Latin Literature (2 vols.). Cambridge: Cambridge University Press, 2021.

=== Edited volumes ===
- Roman Literature and its Contexts (series co-editor, with Stephen Hinds). Cambridge University Press, from 1993.
- Virgil: Aeneid, trans. C. H. Sisson (editor). Everyman, 1998.
- Traditions and Contexts in the Poetry of Horace (co-editor, with Tony Woodman). Cambridge University Press, 2002.
- How Literatures Begin: A Global History (co-editor, with Joel B. Lande). Princeton University Press, 2021.

=== Other ===
- "Introduction," in Ovid, Metamorphoses: A New Verse Translation, trans. David Raeburn. Penguin Classics, 2004.
