= Sather Gate =

- Sather Gate and Bridge
- U.S. National Register of Historic Places
- Berkeley Landmark
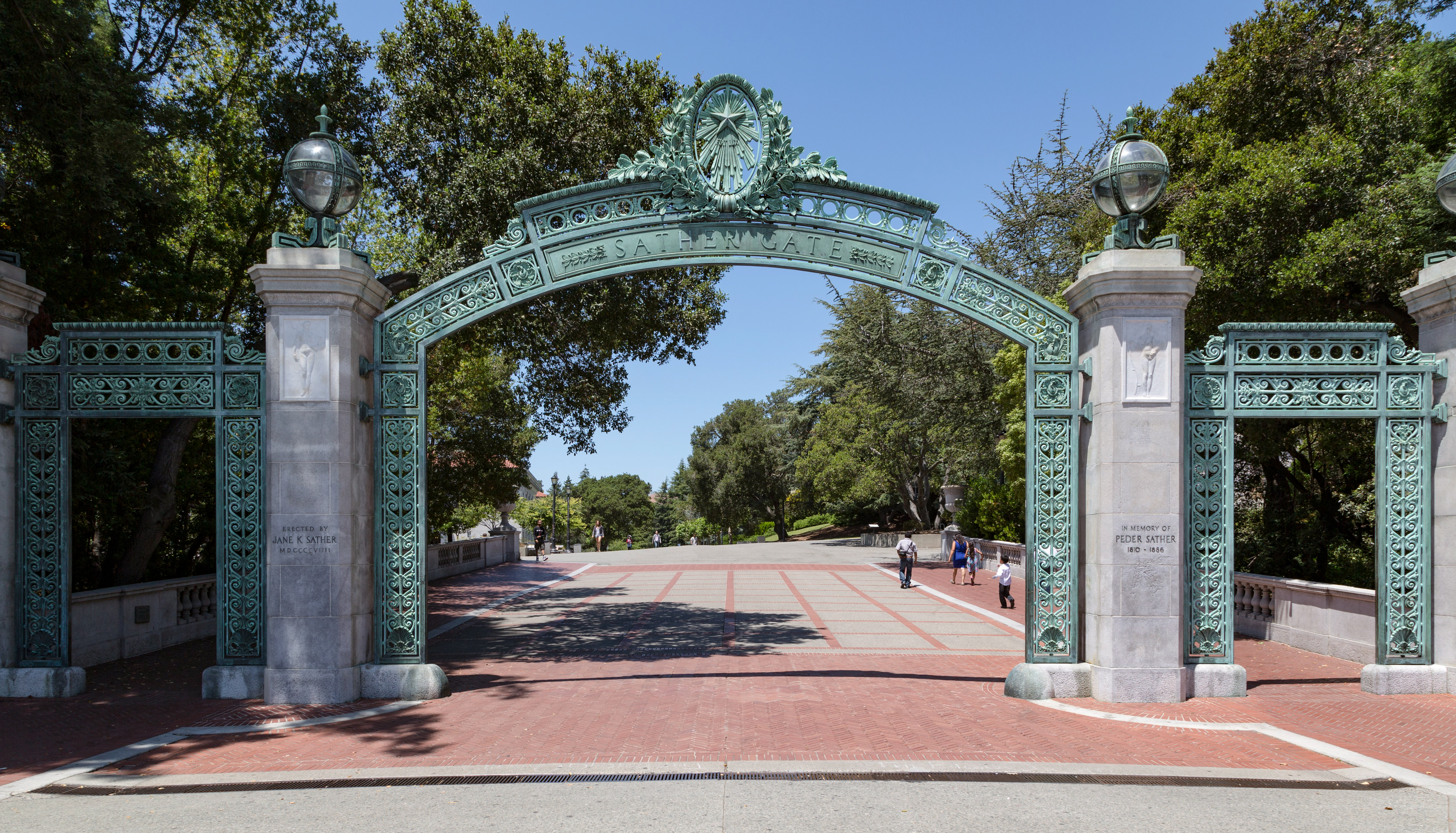
- Sather Gate in 2012
- Location: University of California campus in Berkeley
- Coordinates: 37°52′12.7848″N 122°15′34.131″W
- Area: 0.2 acres (0.081 ha)
- Built: 1910
- Architect: John Galen Howard
- Architectural style: Classical Revival-Beaux-Arts
- MPS: Berkeley, University of California MRA
- NRHP reference No.: 82004649
- BERKL No.: 157

Significant dates
- Added to NRHP: March 25, 1982
- Designated BERKL: February 25, 1991

Sather Gate is a prominent landmark separating Sproul Plaza from the bridge over Strawberry Creek, leading to the center of the University of California, Berkeley campus. The gate was donated by Jane K. Sather, a benefactor of the university, in memory of her late husband Peder Sather, a trustee of the College of California, which later became the University of California. It is California Historical Landmark No. 946 and No. 82004649 in the National Register of Historic Places.

== History ==
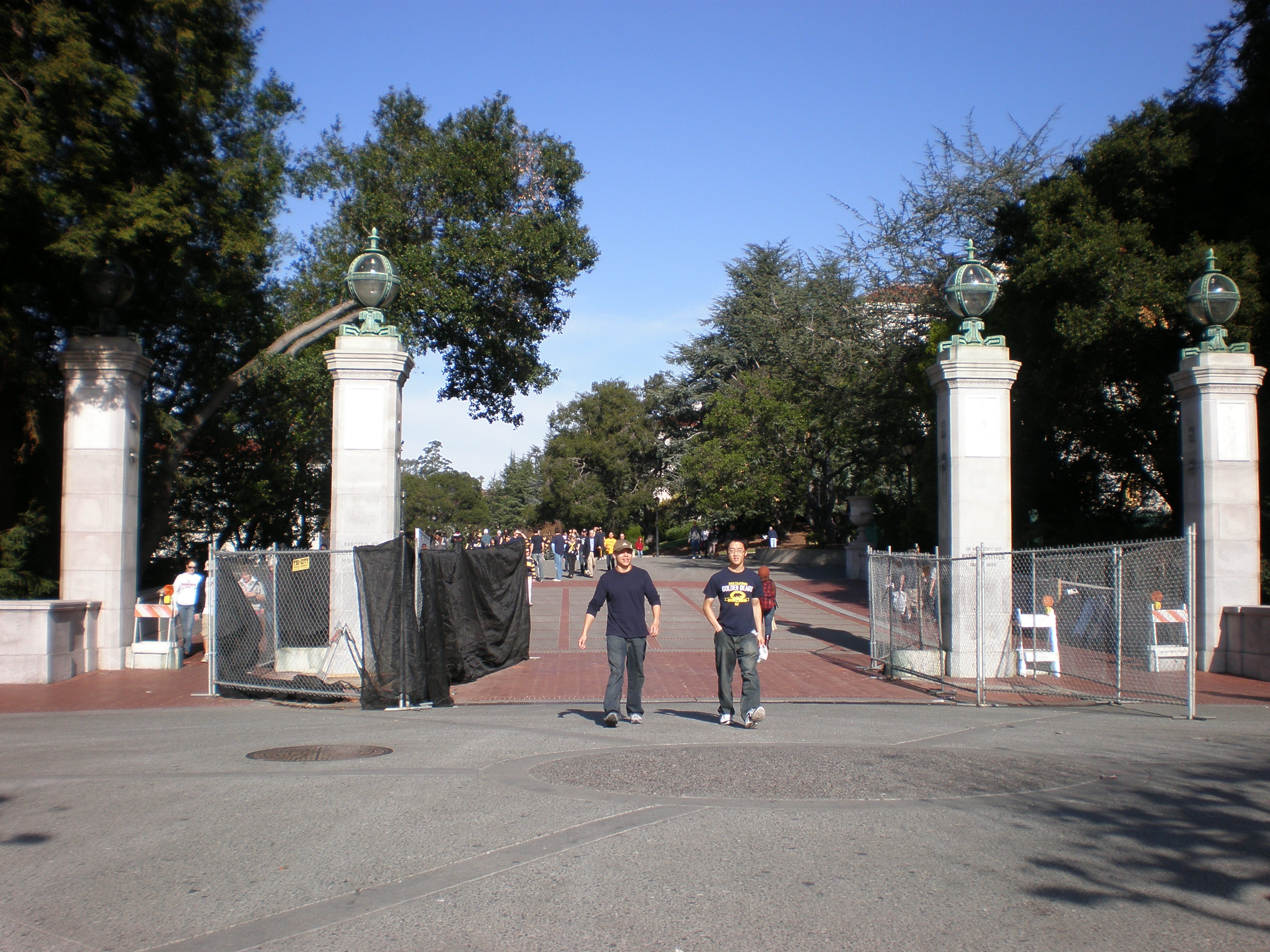
Sather Gate with its metalwork removed in November 2008

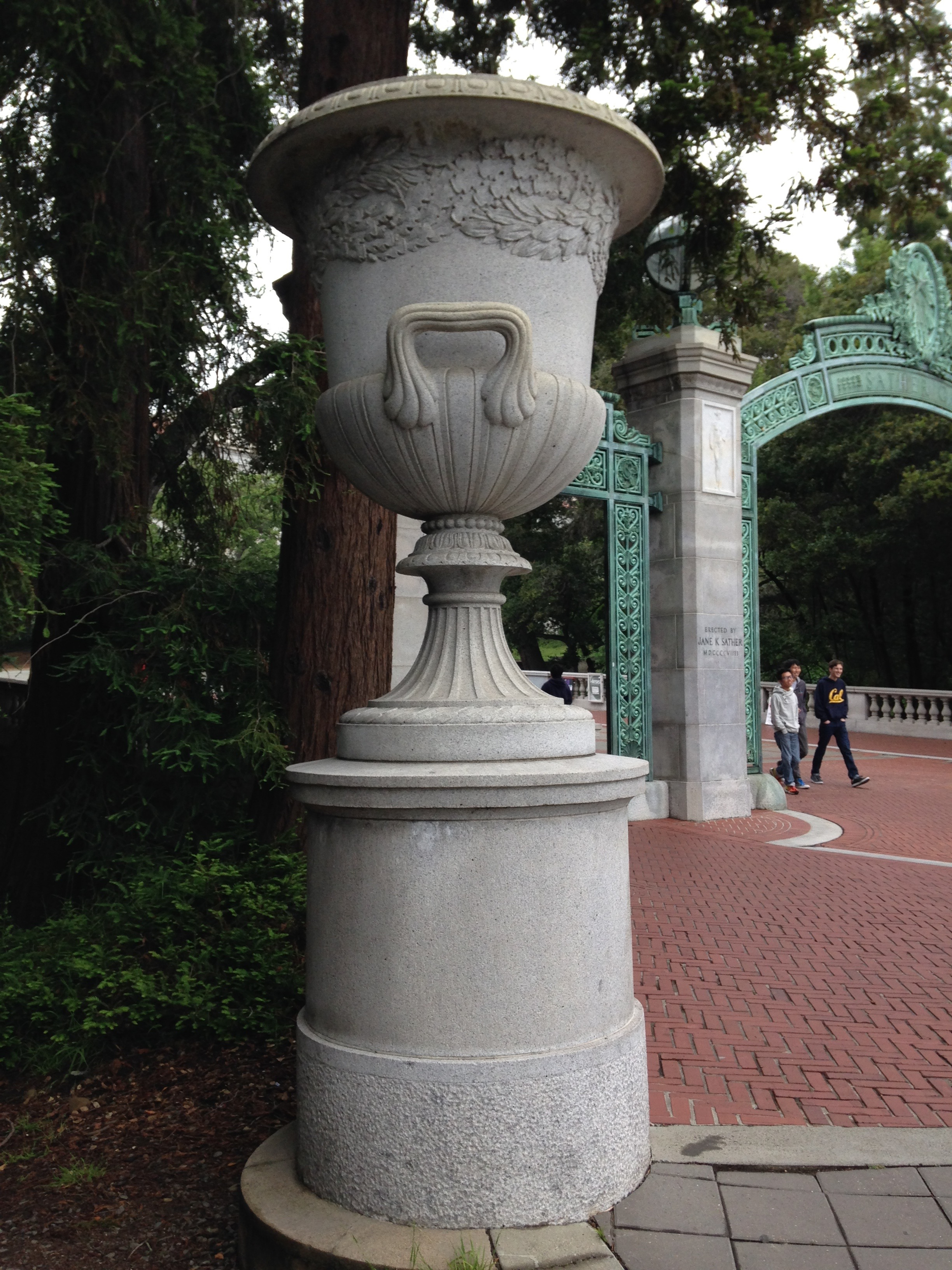
Grey granite campana urn with oak and laurel leaves victor ludorum carving c. 1908 on the Sather Gate at UC Berkeley

Designed by John Galen Howard and built by Giovanni "John" Meneghetti in the Classical Revival Beaux-Arts style, Sather Gate was completed in 1910. Atop the gate are eight panels of bas-relief figures: four nude men representing the disciplines of law, letters, medicine, and mining, and four nude women representing the disciplines of agriculture, architecture, art, and electricity. They were sculpted by Professor Earl Cummings. From 1910 to 1977, the panels were removed due to differences with Jane Sather. By 1979 they were all reinstalled.

Originally, the gate served as the formal southern entrance to the university campus. The university later expanded further south of Strawberry Creek, and the gate is now well separated from Berkeley's city streets by Sproul Plaza.

Between October 2008 and April 2009, Sather Gate underwent restoration that focused on its bronze and steel metal work, which had deteriorated over time. It remained open to pedestrian and vehicular traffic during the period of restoration. Wiss, Janney, Elstner Associates, Inc., coordinated the restoration, which received a 2010 Design Award from the California Preservation Foundation.

=== Free Speech Movement ===
Sather Gate is part of the historic Sproul Plaza, a major center for student activity and the scene of many protests during the Free Speech Movement. The gate is a notable subject of one of the most recognizable and iconic photographs of the Movement, a fall 1964 shot of students walking through it, carrying the Free Speech banner.
