= James Frank Gilliam =

American academic

- Born: March 14, 1915; Seattle, U.S.
- Died: March 16, 1990 (aged 75); Princeton, New Jersey, U.S.

James Frank Gilliam (14 March 1915 – 16 March 1990) was an American classical scholar and historian of ancient Rome.

== Career ==
James Frank Gilliam studied at San Jose State University (B.A. 1935) and at Stanford University (M.A. 1936). In 1940 he earned his Ph.D. at Yale University under the classicist Michael Rostovtzeff. After his Ph.D., he worked as an instructor in classics until his academic career was interrupted by military service in World War II from 1941 to 1945.

In 1947 Gilliam joined the faculty of Wells College in Aurora, New York as an assistant professor. In 1949 he moved to the University of Iowa, where he became a professor of history and classics, remaining until 1961. After a year as a professor of history at the University of Oregon (1961–1962), Gilliam became a professor of Greek and Latin at Columbia University. His final academic appointment was at the Institute for Advanced Study (IAS) in Princeton, New Jersey, wherein 1965 he became a professor of classics and history in the School of Historical Studies. He retired from the IAS as professor emeritus in 1985. Already in the academic years 1958/1959 and 1963/1964 he had been a visiting member of the IAS. In the academic year 1955/1956, he was a Guggenheim Fellow. He was also a Marshall Scholar.

From 1970 to 1985, Gilliam worked part-time at Columbia University: from 1970 to 1981 as curator of the papyri collection and from 1970 to 1985 as an adjunct professor. From 1972 to 1975 he was a visiting lecturer at Princeton University. In the academic year 1978/1979 he taught as Sather Professor at the University of California, Berkeley.

== Achievements ==
As Rostovtzeff's student, Gilliam focused his research on papyrology and on Roman military history. Based on the finding from Dura Europos, where Rostovtzeff had excavated in the 1920s and 1930s, Gilliam studied inscriptions and papyrological documents of Roman military history in the eastern provinces. His numerous research papers dealt with almost all aspects of the complexities of Roman military history. His mastery of the material enabled him to plan an exhaustive presentation of ancient Roman military history in monograph form. He repeatedly promised to produce such a presentation but died without fulfilling his plan.

== Sources ==
- Charles Rowan Beye (1994). "Gilliam, James Franklin". In Ward W. Briggs (ed.). Biographical Dictionary of North American Classicists. Westport, CT/London: Greenwood Press. pp. 219–221. ISBN 0-313-24560-6.
- James Frank Gilliam (1986). Roman Army Papers. Vol. 2 of Mavors-Series Roman Army Researches. Amsterdam: J. C. Gieben Publishing. ISBN 90-70265-28-1.
