= Sather Tower =

Bell tower in Berkeley, California, US

- U.S. National Register of Historic Places
- Berkeley Landmark
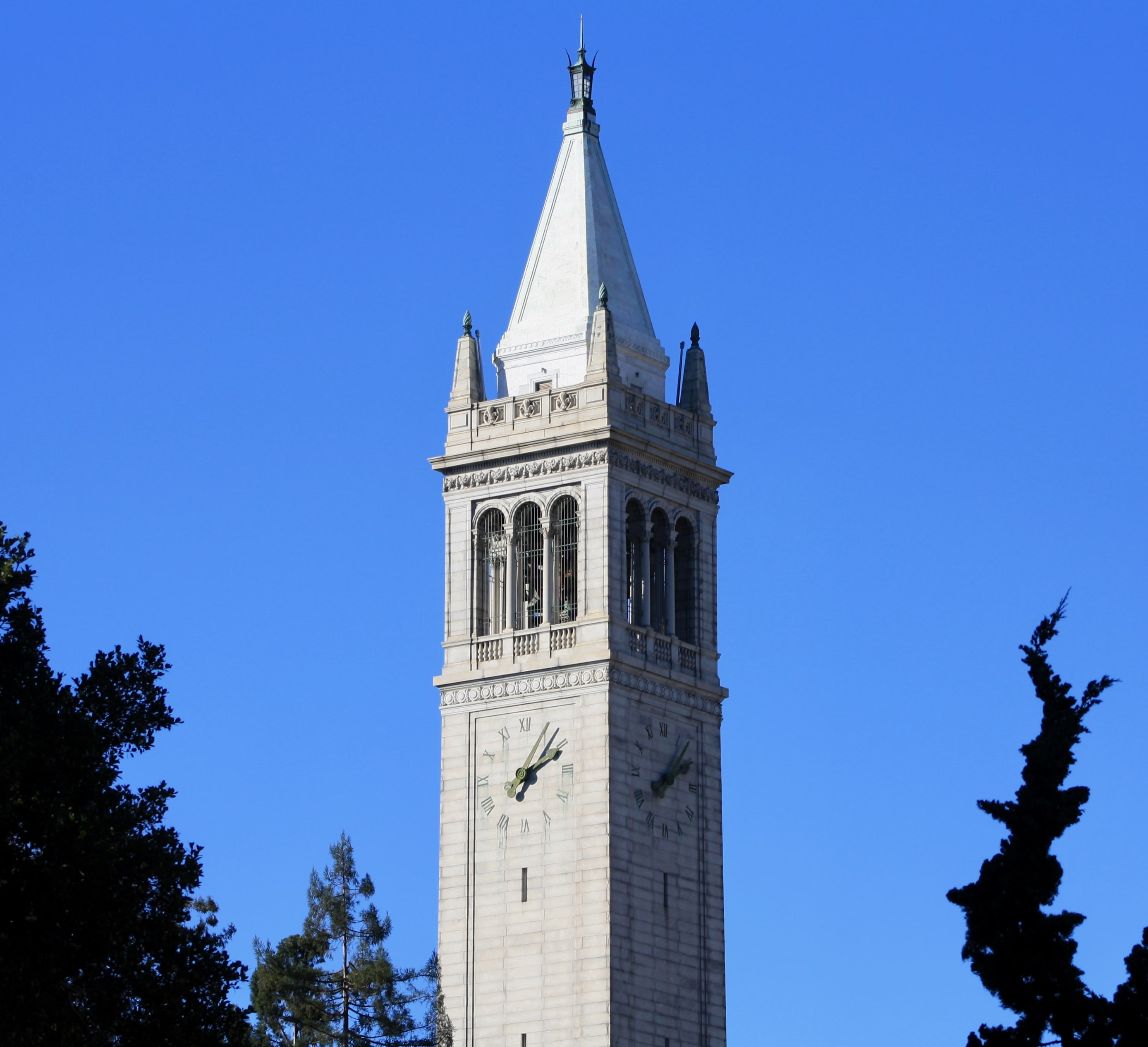
- Sather Tower, photographed from ground level at midday
- Interactive map of Sather Tower
- Location: Berkeley, California
- Coordinates: 37°52′19″N 122°15′28″W
- Built: 1914
- Architect: John Galen Howard
- Architectural style: Gothic Revival
- MPS: Berkeley, University of California MRA
- NRHP reference No.: 82004650
- BERKL No.: 158

Significant dates
- Added to NRHP: March 25, 1982
- Designated BERKL: February 25, 1991

Sather Tower is a bell tower with clocks on its four faces on the campus of the University of California, Berkeley. It is more commonly known as The Campanile (/ˌkæmpəˈniːli, -leɪ/ KAMP-ə-NEE-lee, -lay, also US: /ˌkɑːm-/ KAHMP-) for its resemblance to the Campanile di San Marco in Venice. It is a recognizable symbol of the university.

Given by Jane K. Sather in memory of her husband, banker Peder Sather, it is the second-tallest bell-and-clock-tower in the world. Its current 61-bell carillon, built around a nucleus of 12 bells also given by Jane Sather, can be heard for many miles and supports an extensive program of education in campanology.

Sather Tower also houses many of the Department of Integrative Biology's fossils (mainly from the La Brea Tar Pits) because its cool, dry interior is suited for their preservation.

== Overview ==
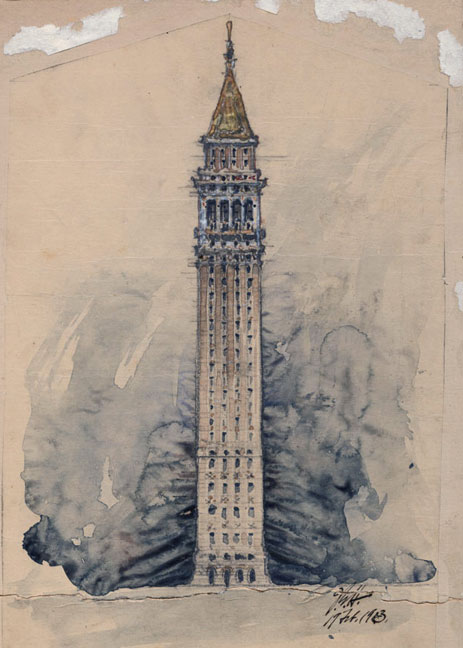
Building apartments into the new tower was considered. (Preliminary drawing, 1903, John Galen Howard.)

At 307 feet (94 m) tall, it is the second-tallest free-standing bell-and-clock-tower in the world. It includes seven principal floors and an eighth-floor observation deck 200 feet (61 m) above the base.

Designed by John Galen Howard, founder of the Department of Architecture at the university, Sather Tower was completed in 1915 and opened to the public in 1916. It marked a secondary axis in Howard's original Beaux-Arts campus plan and has been a major point of orientation in almost every campus master plan since.

Sather Tower houses a full concert carillon, enlarged from the original 12-bell chime installed in October 1917 to 48 bells in 1979 and the current 61 bells in 1983.

During the Fall and Spring semesters, the carillon is performed for ten minutes at 7:50 a.m., noon, and 6:00 p.m. during weekdays, from 12:00–12:15 p.m. and 6:00–6:10 p.m. on Saturdays, and from 2:00–2:45 p.m. on Sundays and intermittently at other times of the year. The bells also toll the hour 7 days a week between the hours of 8 a.m. and 10 p.m. At noon on the last day of instruction each semester, "They're Hanging Danny Deever in the Morning" is played. (The song employs only the original set of bells installed in 1917.) Following that, the carillon is silent until the end of finals.

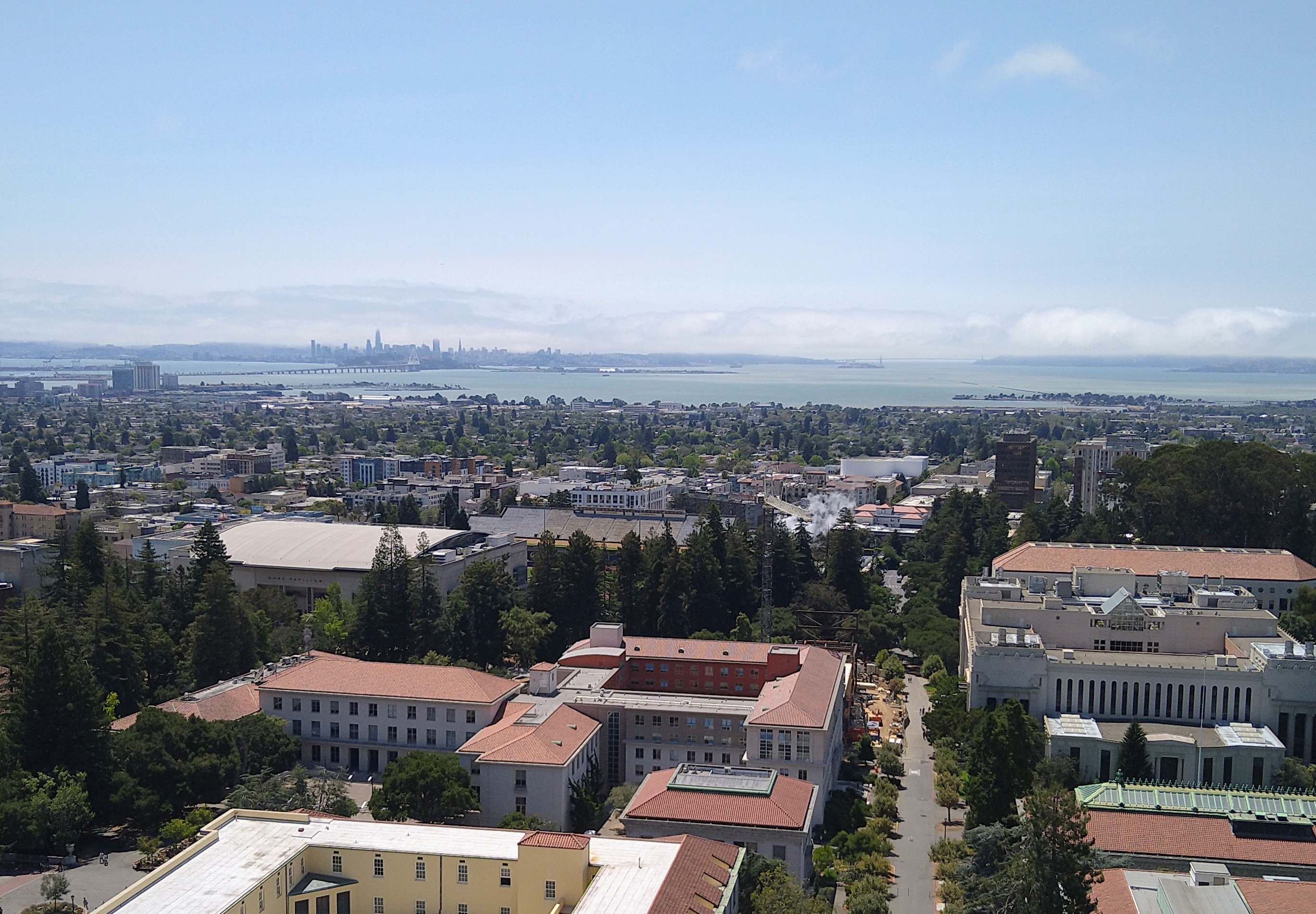
View from the Sather Tower

A gift by Evelyn and Jerry Chambers in 1983 endowed the position of University Carillonist as well as practice rooms, practice keyboards, a campanology library, and international Carillon Festivals every five years from the anniversary of the Class of 1928. Private and group lessons are offered in carillon through the Department of Music, subject to auditions and with Music majors receiving priority. Students work on one of Sather Tower's two practice keyboards until they are ready to perform on the carillon itself.

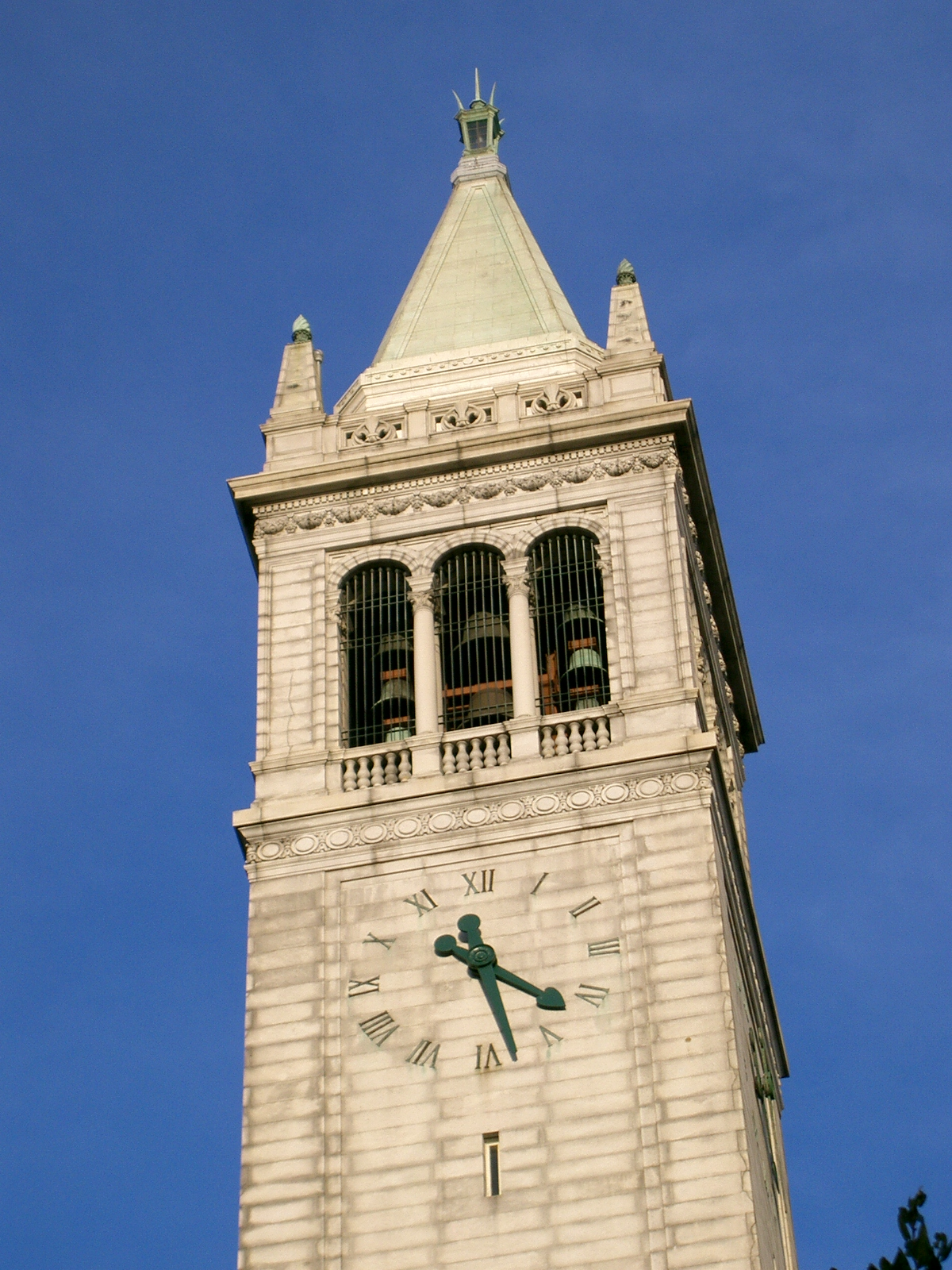
The bell chamber/observation deck, showing a portion of the carillon

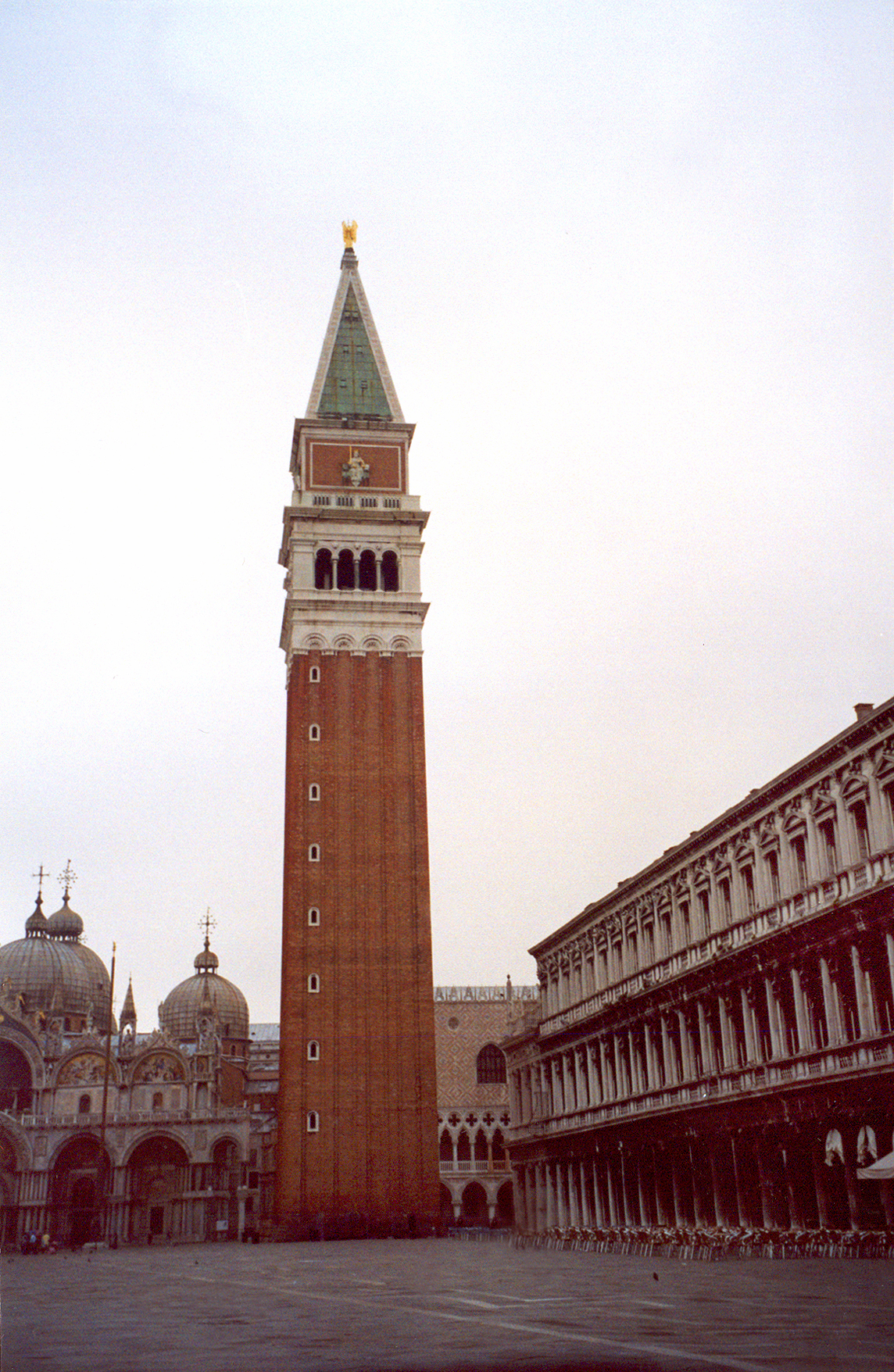
St Mark's Campanile, Venice

An elevator takes visitors 200 feet (61 m) up to an observation deck with sweeping views of the campus, the surrounding hills, San Francisco, and the Golden Gate. Admission is free for UC Berkeley students, staff, and faculty, four dollars for seniors, Cal Alumni Association members, and persons age 17 and under, and five dollars for everyone else.

The trumpets of the California Marching Band every year play Cal spirit songs during Big Game week from the top of the tower. Known as the Campanile Concert, the music can be heard throughout the campus and Berkeley, and in some cases, all the way to Oakland.

The surrounding promenade features a grid of pollarded London Plane trees, frequently enjoyed for the sport of slacklining.

On April 16, 1959, a 67-year-old retired attorney jumped to his death, prompting a daily patrol to guard the platform. On January 4, 1961, a 19-year-old undergraduate student committed suicide. Following this second suicide, the university installed glass panes to enclose the viewing platform. These panes were removed in 1979 due to complaints that the panes were muffling the sound of the expanded carillon. In 1981, metal bars were installed. Nevertheless, in 1982, an undergraduate student managed to scale the newly installed bars but was talked down from the ledge.

The south clock face of the tower has been the target of April Fools’ Day pranks twice. On April 12, 1970, students attached a Mickey Mouse face made from bedsheets to the center of the clock with corresponding white gloves to the clock hands. The stunt was replicated on April 5, 1984, with students affixing a full Mickey Mouse head, arms, and body to the clock.

In 2017, a pair of peregrine falcons began nesting on top of Sather Tower. They were followed by webcams and the Cal Falcons social media project.

== Carillon and its history ==
The Berkeley Carillon originated as a twelve bell chime, cast in 1915 by John Taylor & Co of Loughborough, England. The original bells were a gift of Jane K. Sather, who also gave the university the Sather Tower (in which the bells were housed), Sather Gate (named for her husband the Norwegian-born banker Peder Sather), and endowed chairs in History and Classics. The original bells were installed in 1917 and played for the first time on November 3, 1917, to mark California's Big Game against Washington. The delay between the founding and the installation of the bells was caused by World War I, as well as the US Customs Service in San Francisco.

The original bells all bear the inscription "Gift of Jane K. Sather 1914," acknowledging the benefactress for whom the Tower is named. The largest of the original bells bears an inscription by Isaac Flagg, Professor of Greek, emeritus, "We ring, we chime, we toll, / Lend ye the silent part / Some answer in the heart, / Some echo in the soul." The current bells range from small 19 pound bells to the 10,500 pound "Great Bear Bell," which tolls on the hour and features bas-relief carvings of bears as well as the constellation Ursa Major.

It was soon discovered that these twelve bells (one octave) were insufficient to play many popular tunes, including the national anthem (which requires a range of a twelfth, and thus a bare minimum of twenty bells for chromaticity throughout the range). During the following decades there were a number of discussions about enlarging the instrument, but nothing came of this need.

A thirteenth bell was installed along with a clock in 1926 to strike the hours. This clock and bell had originally been installed in 1899 in Bacon Hall and were named for William Ashburner, a university regent.

In 1978, the Class of 1928 decided, as a fiftieth anniversary gift to the university, to add some bells. They began a campaign among their members, hoping to raise around $45,000 for a few new bells. In several days they managed to raise over $150,000 and decided at that point to enlarge the chime to a full carillon of forty-eight bells. Bids were sought, and the Fonderie Paccard of Annecy, France, was awarded the contract. The new Class of 1928 Carillon, which incorporated the original twelve bells, was installed and inaugurated in 1979. An article about the new instrument in The Guild of Carillonneurs in North America's publication The Bulletin ended by suggesting that perhaps another class might at some future date consider adding additional bells and making this concert carillon into a grand carillon.

In 1983, Jerry Chambers, a wealthy member of the class of 1928, and his wife Evelyn (class of 1932 and honorary member of the class of 1928), along with the class of 1928, gave a handsome endowment for the carillon. These funds were used to enlarge the instrument to a fully chromatic, five-octave instrument beginning with G2, renovation of two floors of Sather Tower for two practice keyboards, a campanology collection, and a studio for the University Carillonist. In addition, the Chambers Carillon funds, which is the sole source of support for the carillon program at Berkeley, endowed a full-time position for the University Carillonist (one of only five full-time positions in North America), and a carillon festival to be held every five years honoring the Class of 1928, counting from that year.

As of 2008, the carillon program is one of the most active in the world. It offers an instructional program which attracts about thirty students each semester, a performance program of seventeen ten-minute recitals and one forty-five-minute recital each week. There is additionally a professional staff of eight artist performers, and a part-time maintenance person. The carillon program remains fully funded by the generous endowment of Jerry and Evelyn Chambers.

== See also ==
- List of carillons in the United States
