= Benjamin Oliver Foster =

American classical philologist

B. O. Foster
- Born: August 13, 1872; Bangor, Maine, U.S.
- Died: June 22, 1938 (aged 65); Palo Alto, California, U.S.
- Spouse: Anna Lee (m. 1902)

Benjamin Oliver Foster (1872–1938) was an American classical philologist and professor at Stanford University. He is known for his translation of the first five volumes of Livy's Ab Urbe Condita (Books 1–22) for the Loeb Classical Library.

== Personal life ==
He married Anna Lee on June 3, 1902.

== Bibliography ==
- Chambers, Mortimer (1994). "Foster, Benjamin Oliver". In Ward, W. Briggs (ed.). Biographical Dictionary of North American Classicists. Westport, CT: Greenwood Press. p. 192. ISBN 978-0-313245-60-2.
- Foster, B. O. (1919). Livy I: Books I and II. Loeb Classical Library. Cambridge, MA: Harvard University Press.
