= Jane Sather =

American philanthropist (1824–1911)

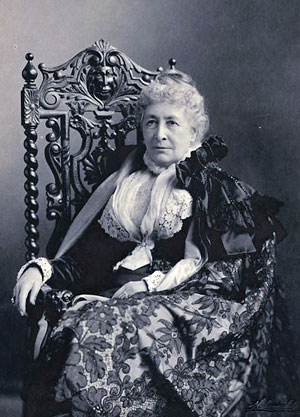
Sather c. 1905

Jane K. Sather (née Krom; March 9, 1824 – December 11, 1911) was an American philanthropist and one of the University of California, Berkeley's most significant benefactors. She founded the Sather Professorship of Classical Literature and the Sather Professorship of History at Berkeley.

== Personal life and politics ==
She was born Jane Krom in Brooklyn on March 9, 1824, to a French mother and a Dutch father. Krom married Peder Sather, a trustee of the University of California, in 1882 after the death of her first husband and Peder's first wife. Her first husband is named in some sources as John Reade or John Read. She was a keen supporter of women's suffrage and a prominent member of her local branch of Sorosis (est. 1868), the first professional women's club in the United States.

Jane K. Sather died on December 11, 1911, and is buried in Oakland's Mountain View Cemetery.

== Relationship with University of California ==
After Peder Sather's death, the responsibility of managing his fortune fell to Jane. She initially donated $75,000 to the university in 1900, and later a parcel of land in Oakland; further bequests of land and money were made in subsequent years. Benjamin Ide Wheeler, President of the University of California from 1899 to 1919, encouraged Jane Sather to found the Sather Professorship of Classical Literature; this enables a distinguished classical scholar to spend a term in Berkeley every year. She also donated $200,000 to the university for the building of the 307-foot-tall (94 m) Sather Tower, also known as "The Campanile".
