= Princeton Cemetery =

Cemetery in Princeton, New Jersey

- Presidents row, showing grave of Vice-President Aaron Burr Jr. in front of those of his father, Aaron Burr Sr., and grandfather, Jonathan Edwards, both presidents of the College of New Jersey, now Princeton University
- Interactive map of Princeton Cemetery

Details
- Established: 1757; 269 years ago
- Location: Princeton, New Jersey
- Country: United States
- Coordinates: 40°21′18″N 74°39′36″W
- Owned by: Nassau Presbyterian Church
- No. of graves: 9,000+
- Website: Princeton Cemetery
- Find a Grave: Princeton Cemetery
- Princeton Cemetery
- U.S. Historic district – Contributing property
- Part of: Princeton Historic District (ID75001143)
- Added to NRHP: 27 June 1975

Princeton Cemetery is located in Princeton, New Jersey, United States. It is owned by the Nassau Presbyterian Church. In his 1878 history of Princeton, New Jersey, John F. Hageman refers to the cemetery as "The Westminster Abbey of the United States."

== Notable burials ==
- Archibald Alexander (1772–1851), Presbyterian theologian
- James Waddel Alexander (1804–1859), Presbyterian theologian and eldest son of Archibald Alexander
- Joseph Addison Alexander (1809–1860), Presbyterian biblical scholar and third son of Archibald Alexander
- William Cowper Alexander (1806–1874), politician, businessman and second son of Archibald Alexander
- Frank Anscombe (1918–2001), statistician, known for Anscombe's quartet
- John N. Bahcall (1934–2005), astrophysicist
- George Wildman Ball (1909–1994), diplomat
- George Dashiell Bayard (1835–1862), Civil War general
- Sylvia Beach (1887–1962), bookshop owner
- Harold H. Bender (1882–1951), philologist
- John Berrien (1711–1772), New Jersey Supreme Court Justice and owner of Rockingham, Washington's headquarters
- William G. Bowen, (1933–2016), president of Princeton University
- Aaron Burr (1756–1836), controversial Revolutionary War hero and politician, third vice president of the United States, killer of Alexander Hamilton, adventurer who was eventually tried and acquitted of treason
- Aaron Burr Sr. (1716–1757), Presbyterian minister, second president of Princeton University and father of Aaron Burr
- Brendan Byrne (1924–2018), 47th governor of New Jersey
- Alonzo Church (1903–1995), mathematician
- Grover Cleveland (1837–1908), 22nd and 24th president of the United States
- Frances Folsom Cleveland Preston (1864–1947), wife of Grover Cleveland and First Lady of the United States
- Ruth Cleveland (1891–1904), first child of Grover and Frances Cleveland and supposed name sake of the Baby Ruth candy bar
- Edward Samuel Corwin (1878–1963), author and professor of law
- Samuel Davies (1723–1761), president of Princeton University
- Erling Dorf (1905–1984), renowned paleobotanist, professor of Geology at Princeton University
- Jonathan Edwards (1703–1758), president of Princeton University and Calvinist theologian
- Richard Stockton Field (1803–1870), US senator and New Jersey Attorney General
- John Huston Finley (1863–1940), author, president of Knox College and University of the State of New York
- Donald B. Fullerton (1892–1985), missionary and founder of the Princeton Christian Fellowship
- Harold Furth (1930–2002), physicist
- George Horace Gallup (1901–1984), pollster
- William Francis Gibbs (1886–1967), naval architect
- Kurt Gödel (1906–1978), mathematician
- Michael Graves (1934–2015), architect and product designer
- Ashbel Green (July 6, 1762 – May 19, 1848), Chaplain of the United States House of Representatives
- Peter Charles Harris (1865–1951), adjutant general of the U.S. Army
- Charles Hodge (1797–1878), Calvinist theologian
- David Hunter (1802–1886), Civil War General
- Louis "Lajos" Jambor (1884–1954), Hungarian-born American painter, illustrator and muralist.
- William Hallock Johnson (1865–1963), president of Lincoln University in Pennsylvania
- Joseph Kargé (1823–1892), Civil War General and Princeton University professor
- George Frost Kennan (1904–2005), diplomat
- Alan Krueger (1960–2019), economist
- Frank Lewin (1925–2008), composer
- David Kellogg Lewis (1941–2001), philosopher
- Edward Parke Custis Lewis (1837–1892), diplomat
- John Maclean Jr. (1800–1886), president of Princeton University
- Robert McNutt McElroy (1872–1959), historian and professor of history at Princeton University, Oxford University, and Cambridge University
- José Menendez (1944–1989) and Mary Louise (Kitty) Menendez (1941–1989), murder victims of their sons, Lyle and Erik Menendez
- John O'Hara (1905–1970), author of Appointment in Samarra, BUtterfield 8, and many short stories
- Moses Taylor Pyne (1855–1921), financier, philanthropist and owner of Drumthwacket Estate
- Roger Atkinson Pryor (1828–1919), Special US Minister to Greece, US congressman from Virginia, Confederate congressman and general, journalist, New York Supreme Court justice
- William Drew Robeson (1844–1918), father of singer, actor and activist Paul Robeson
- Henry Norris Russell (1877–1957), astronomer
- William Milligan Sloane (1850–1928), first US Olympic Committee president
- Howard Alexander Smith (1880–1966), US senator from New Jersey
- John P. Stockton (1826–1900), New Jersey attorney general and U.S. senator
- Richard Stockton (1764–1828), U.S. senator from New Jersey
- Robert Field Stockton (1795–1866), naval officer
- Lyman Spitzer (1914–1997), astronomer
- John Renshaw Thomson (1800–1862), U.S. senator from New Jersey
- William G. Thompson (1840–1904), mayor of Detroit
- Augustus Trowbridge (1870–1934), professor and dean at Princeton University
- John W. Tukey (1915–2000), statistician
- Paul Tulane (1801–1887), Tulane University benefactor
- John von Neumann (1903–1957), mathematician
- Benjamin Breckinridge Warfield (1851–1921), Presbyterian theologian
- Andrew Fleming West (1853–1943), classicist, Giger Professor of Latin and first dean of the Princeton University Graduate School
- Canvass White (1790–1834), engineer and inventor
- Eugene Paul Wigner (1902–1995), Nobel Prize-winning physicist
- John Witherspoon (1723–1794), signer of the Declaration of Independence
- William Willet (1867–1921), portraitist and stained glass designer

== Gallery ==
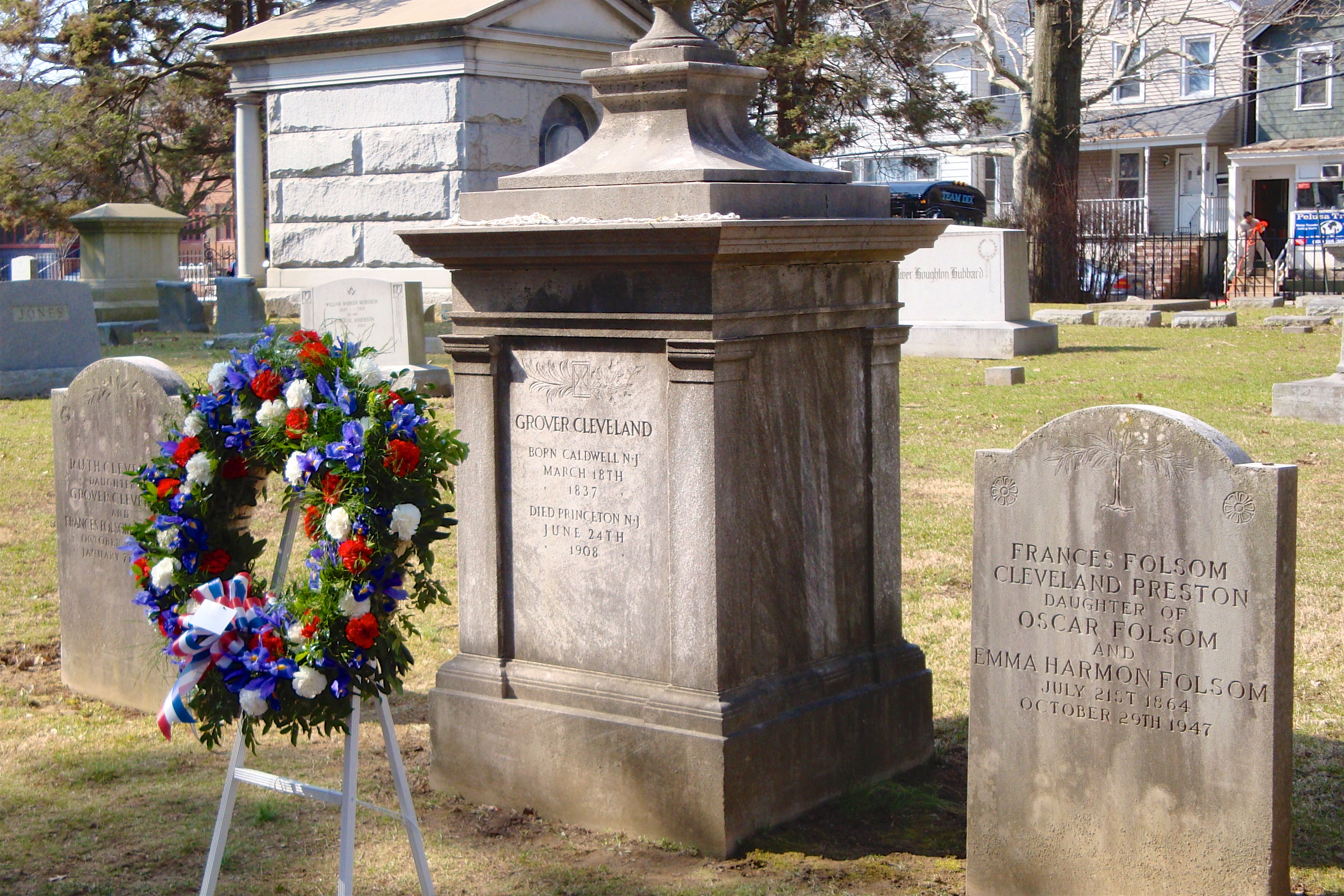
Graves of Grover Cleveland (center), his wife Frances Folsom Cleveland Preston (right), and daughter Ruth Cleveland (left)

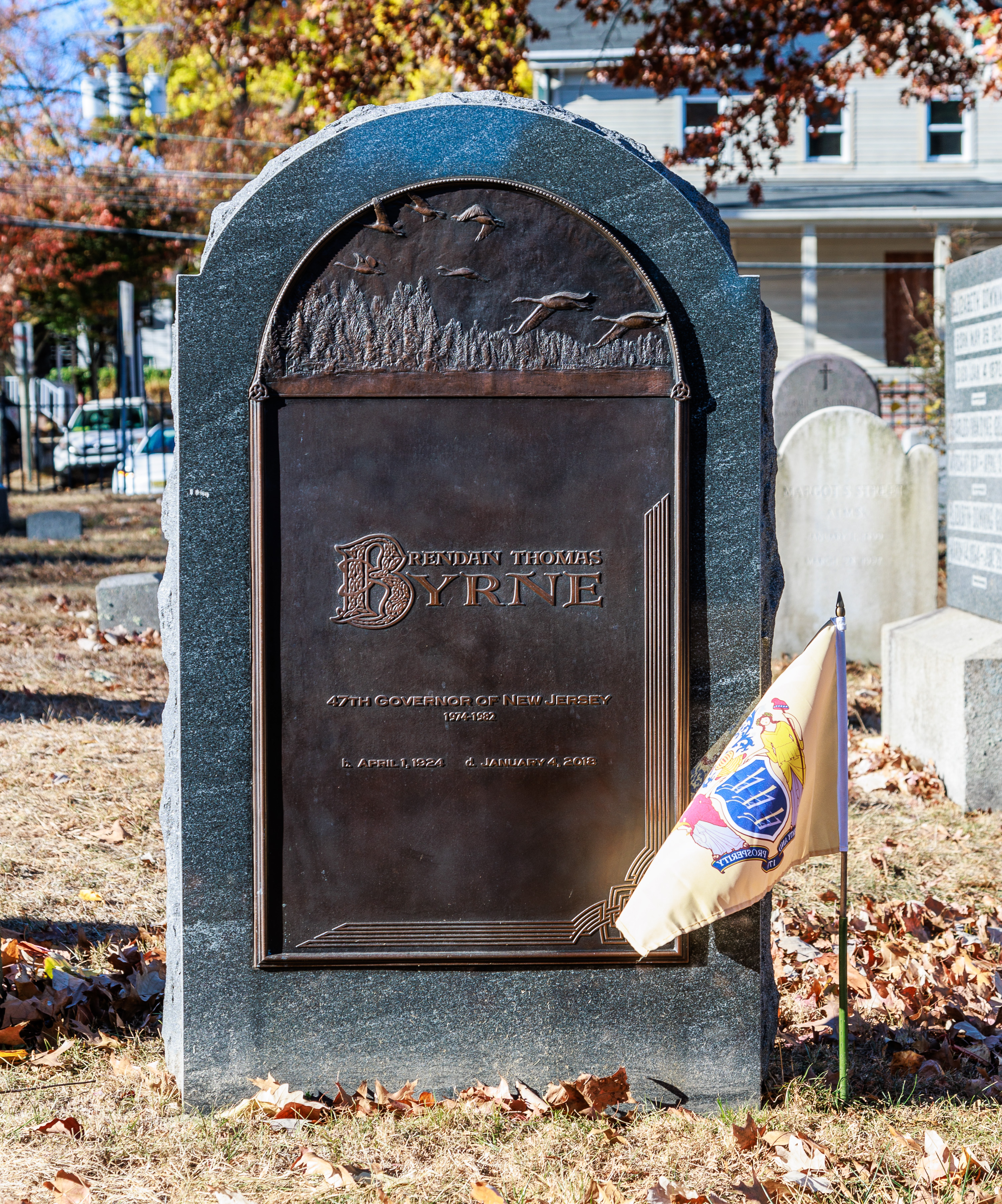
Grave of New Jersey Governor Brendan Byrne

== See also ==
- List of burial places of presidents and vice presidents of the United States
