= Department of Mathematics (Princeton University) =

Academic department at Princeton University

Coordinates: 40.34914°N 74.65362°W

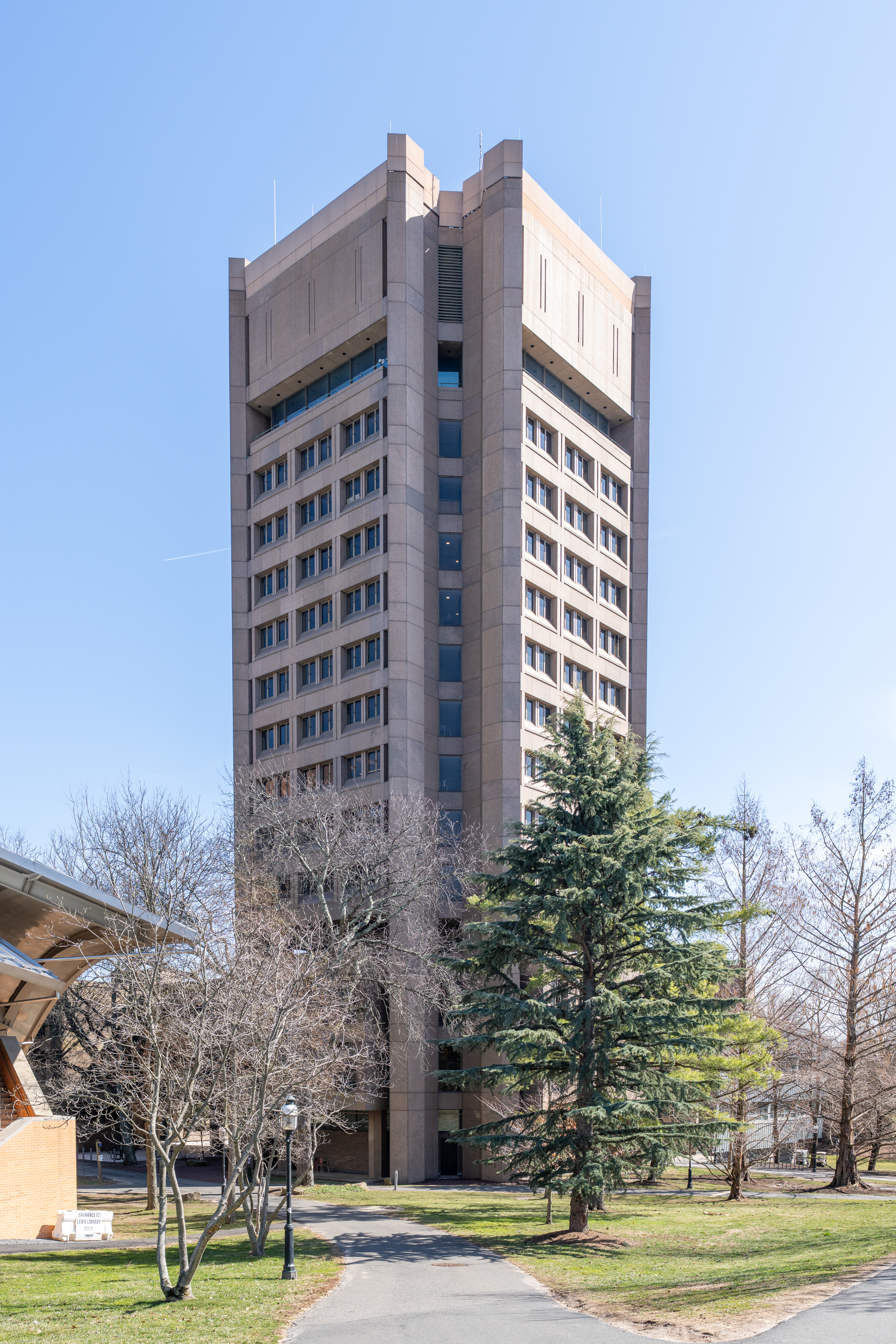
- Fine Hall, home to the Department of Mathematics
- Type: Private
- Established: 1760
- Parent institution: Princeton University
- Dean: Igor Rodnianski
- Faculty: 101 faculty members and researchers (2018–2019)
- Students: 70 undergraduate students 78 graduate students (2018–2019)
- Location: Princeton, New Jersey, United States
- Website: www.math.princeton.edu

The Department of Mathematics is an academic department at Princeton University. Founded in 1760, the department has trained some of the world's most renowned and internationally recognized scholars of mathematics. Notable individuals affiliated with the department include John Nash, former faculty member and winner of the 1994 Nobel Memorial Prize in Economic Sciences; Alan Turing, who received his doctorate from the department; and Albert Einstein who frequently gave lectures at Princeton and had an office in the building. Fields Medalists associated with the department include Manjul Bhargava, Charles Fefferman, Gerd Faltings, Michael Freedman, Elon Lindenstrauss, Andrei Okounkov, Terence Tao, William Thurston, Akshay Venkatesh, and Edward Witten (who began graduate study in the mathematics department before transferring to the physics department). Many other Princeton mathematicians are noteworthy, including Ralph Fox, Donald C. Spencer, John R. Stallings, Norman Steenrod, John Tate, John Tukey, Arthur Wightman, and Andrew Wiles.

The chair of the department is Christopher Skinner.

== History ==
The first courses in mathematics were offered in 1760 when undergraduates enrolled in classes such as algebra, trigonometry, geometry, and conic sections. Walter Minto was one of the earliest teachers of mathematics beginning in 1787. By the beginning of the twentieth century, the department became "one of the world's great centers of mathematical teaching and research." President Woodrow Wilson appointed Henry Burchard Fine as dean of the faculty in 1903 and later as the first chairman of the Department of Mathematics in 1905. The university invited a number of leading mathematics to conduct research at Princeton including Luther P. Eisenhart, Solomon Lefschetz, James W. Alexander II, James Jeans, J.H.M. Wedderburn, George David Birkhoff, Oswald Veblen. In 1928, Princeton created the first research professorship in mathematics in the United States. Research in the field of mathematics also continued to thrive when the Institute for Advanced Study (IAS) was founded in Princeton, New Jersey in 1930. Although the IAS and Princeton remain separate, they have continued to maintain close relations and collaborative projects thanks to their proximity to one another. Students and faculty are able to collaborate with IAS members and attend IAS seminar series.

The political situation in Europe also caused an increased number of immigrants to enter the United States beginning in the 1930s. These scholars included Emil Artin, Valentine Bargmann, and William Feller. Others worked with both the then School of Mathematics and the Institute for Advanced Study to immigrate to the United States, including Albert Einstein, Hermann Weyl, Oskar Morgenstern, John von Neumann, Eugene Wigner, and Paul Erdős. Albert Einstein, although never holding a position at the university, delivered a series of lectures on his theory of relativity in 1921 and continued to hold an office within the Department of Mathematics' building, Fine Hall, named in honor of the first faculty teacher and Princeton's first dean of science, Henry Burchard Fine. The fireplace in the professors' lounge was surmounted by a famous Einstein quote: "God does not play dice with the universe."

In 1968, the department moved to a new Fine Hall (the old building being renamed Jones Hall). The new building features three stories of classrooms and graduate student offices. Another ten floors contain faculty offices, a seminar room, and a professors' lounge. Fine Hall has been described as the "anchor of mathematics" as it was the home of the School of Mathematics. It was then that closer collaboration between the Institute for Advanced Study and Princeton University strengthened. Fine Hall also connects to Jadwin Hall, which is home to additional classroom and academic facilities. The architects of Fine and Jadwin Hall won the Award of Merit in the Architectural Design Award Program in 1966.

== Research ==
Portrait of Albert Einstein at Princeton, 1935
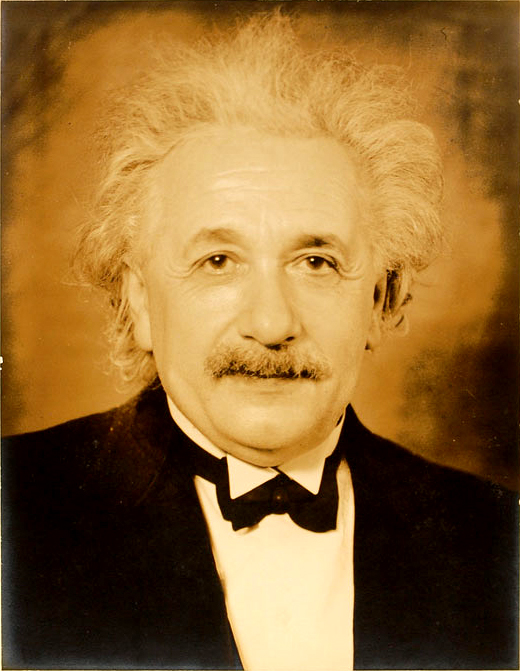
- Einstein delivered several lectures and frequently visited the department

=== Albert Einstein Memorial Lecture ===
The Albert Einstein Memorial Lecture is held annually at Princeton on or around Einstein's birthday on March 14. The lecture is free and open to the public. The 24th Annual Albert Einstein Memorial Lecture was dedicated to "Scientific Inquiry and Growth". It featured Nobel Prize Winner Jack Szostak giving a presentation on "The Origin of Life".

=== Program in Applied and Computational Mathematics ===
The department runs the Program in Applied and Computational Mathematics (PACM), an interdisciplinary and interdepartmental program for scholars interested in the application of mathematics to other fields. The PACM faculty consists of 15 core members, in addition to an executive committee, 34 graduate students, and 30 undergraduate certificate students. The PACM has been at the forefront of research within the field of high-energy physics, notably leading the NSF-funded Institute for Research and Innovation in Software for High Energy Physics (IRIS-HEP), a coalition of 17 research universities that develops computing software for the Large Hadron Collider (LHC) at CERN in Geneva, Switzerland.

=== Annals of Mathematics ===
The department also co-publishes a bimonthly academic journal, the Annals of Mathematics, with the Institute for Advanced Study. Founded in 1884, the Annals is frequently recognized as one of the top journals in mathematics.

=== Women and Mathematics ===
The Women and Mathematics program is co-directed by the department and the IAS. The initiative aims to "recruit and retain more women in mathematics" through its lectures and mentorship program. Sun-Yung Alice Chang, the previous chairperson and first female chair, has taken a personal interest in attracting more women into the field.

== Academics ==
=== Awards and Medals ===
A number of individuals affiliated with the department have won international prizes for their research in mathematics, including the Fields Medal, the Wolf Prize, the Henri Poincaré Prize, the Shaw Prize, Goldwater Scholars, and the Fulbright Award.

=== Undergraduate ===
At the undergraduate level, approximately 70–75 students concentrate in the field. Students complete required courses in real analysis, complex analysis, algebra, geometry, and topology. Like all A.B. candidates at Princeton, students are required to complete a senior thesis based on original and independent research. Students are also permitted to study abroad for a semester or an academic year at one of several internationally recognized institutions including the University of Oxford, the University of Cambridge, Bonn University, the University of Moscow, and the University of Budapest.

The department encourages those interested in pursuing careers to participate in the Principia: The Princeton Undergraduate Mathematics Journal. The journal was founded to promote and encourage research and exposition in mathematics at the undergraduate level. It was one of the first of its kind to be developed by undergraduates and has served as the model for academic journals at other universities.

=== Graduate ===
Ph.D. candidates in the department conduct independent research under supervision of a faculty member. After completing a series of introductory-level courses, graduate students specialize in at least two special or advanced topics within the discipline. Notably, students must demonstrate proficiency in one foreign language (French, German, or Russian), proving their ability to work with mathematical texts from scholars around the world. Graduate students are offered full tuition and student health plan coverage for all five years of the program. They are also able to apply for additional external funding and/or teach courses as Assistants-in-Instruction (AIs).

=== Rankings ===
In both national and international rankings, Princeton places within the top five of universities for the study of mathematics. It is ranked by the U.S. News & World Report as the No. 1 program nationwide, tied only with that of the Massachusetts Institute of Technology, and placed prior to those of Harvard University, Stanford University, and the University of California, Berkeley. Its particular strengths are Algebra, Number Theory, Algebraic Geometry, Geometry, and Topology, as those are the specialties ranked as No. 1. Times Higher Education also places the department as No. 1, qualifying it as a premier institute for mathematics worldwide, seen as ahead of international universities such as the University of Oxford, the University of Cambridge, and ETH Zurich.

== Notable faculty ==
The department is home to a number of scholars, researchers, and professors who have continued to be recognized by the international community. The university has been affiliated with 15 Fields Medalists, behind Harvard University (#1 with 18) and the University of Paris (#2 with 16). Some of these scholars include:

- Manjul Bhargava – professor of mathematics, Fields Medalist
- Sun-Yung Alice Chang – professor of mathematics, winner of Ruth Lyttle Satter Prize in Mathematics of the American Mathematical Society (1995)
- John H. Conway – professor of mathematics, best known for the Game of Life
- Ingrid Daubechies – professor of mathematics; namesake of Daubechies wavelet
- Paul Erdős – professor of mathematics, contributor to the Ramsey theory, Wolf Prize (1983), Cole Prize (1951)
- Charles Fefferman – professor of mathematics, Fields Medalist, Alan T. Waterman Award (1976)
- Robert C. Gunning – professor of mathematics
- Nicholas Katz – professor of mathematics
- Elliott H. Lieb – Heineman Prize for Mathematical Physics (1978), Max Planck Medal (1988), Birkhoff Prize (1988), Boltzmann Medal (1998), Rolf Schock Prize in Mathematics (2001), Levi L. Conant Prize (2002), Henri Poincaré Prize (2003)
- Elon Lindenstrauss – professor of mathematics, Fields Medalist
- Fernando Codá Marques – professor of mathematics
- Sophie Morel – professor of mathematics, winner of the European Mathematical Society Prize (2012)
- Oskar Morgenstern – professor of economics, founder of Mathematica and Mathematica Policy Research Inc., founder of game theory and the Von Neumann–Morgenstern utility theorem
- Andrei Okounkov – professor of mathematics, Fields Medalist
- Gerd Faltings - professor of mathematics, Fields Medalist
- June Huh – professor of mathematics, Fields Medalist (2022)
- Peter Ozsváth – professor of mathematics
- John Pardon – professor of mathematics, Morgan Prize (2012)
- Peter Sarnak – professor of mathematics, George Pólya Prize (1998), Ostrowski Prize (2001), Levi L. Conant Prize (2003), Cole Prize (2005), Wolf Prize (2014)
- Goro Shimura – professor emeritus of mathematics, fundamental contributions to number theory and automorphic forms, especially in Langlands program
- Yakov G. Sinai – professor of mathematics
- Elias M. Stein – professor of mathematics, recipient of the Steele Prize (1984 and 2002), the Schock Prize in Mathematics (1993), the Wolf Prize in Mathematics (1999), the National Medal of Science (2002), and Stefan Bergman Prize (2005)
- Paul Steinhardt – Albert Einstein professor of physics; recipient of the Dirac Medal (2002)
- Hermann Weyl – professor of mathematics, Fellow of the Royal Society (1936)
- Andrew Wiles – professor of mathematics, proved Fermat's Last Theorem, winner of the Schock Prize (1995), Royal Medal (1996), Cole Prize (1996), Wolf Prize (1996), King Faisal International Prize (1998) and Shaw Prize (2005)
- Shou-Wu Zhang – professor of mathematics, Morningside Gold Medal of Mathematics (1998)

== Notable alumni ==
- Eugenio Calabi (Ph.D., 1950) – professor emeritus, University of Pennsylvania; Leroy P. Steele Prize (1991); Putnam Fellow (1946)
- Alonzo Church (Ph.D., 1927) – professor, University of California, Los Angeles; proved undecidability of the Entscheidungsproblem
- Michael Freedman (Ph.D., 1973) – professor, University of California, San Diego; Fields Medalist (1986)
- Robin Hartshorne (Ph.D., 1963) – professor, University of California, Berkeley; Putnam Fellow (1958); Steele Prize (1979)
- Barry Mazur (Ph.D., 1959) – Gerhard Gade University Professor, Harvard University; Veblen Prize (1966); Cole Prize (1982); National Medal of Science (2011)
- John Milnor (A.B., Ph.D., 1954) – professor, Stony Brook University; Putnam Fellow (1949, 1950); Sloan Fellowship (1955); Fields Medal (1962); Steele Prize (1982, 2004, 2011); Wolf Prize (1989); Abel Prize (2011)
- Marvin Minsky (Ph.D., 1954) – professor, MIT; Turing Award (1969); Benjamin Franklin Medal (2001); co-founder of MIT's AI laboratory
- John Nash (Ph.D.) – Senior Research Mathematician, Princeton University; Nobel Memorial Prize in Economic Sciences (1994);Abel Prize (2015); John von Neumann Theory Prize (1978)
- Lillian Pierce (Ph.D., 2009) – professor, Duke University; Sadosky Prize (2018)
- Terence Tao (Ph.D., 1996) – chair in mathematics at the University of California, Los Angeles; recipient of Fields Medal (2006); Breakthrough Prize in Mathematics (2014)
- John Tate (Ph.D., 1950) – professor emeritus, Harvard University; Abel Prize (2010); Wolf Prize (2002), Steele Prize (1995)
- Richard Taylor (Ph.D., 1988) – professor, Stanford University; Breakthrough Prize in Mathematics (2014); Clay Research Award (2007); Shaw Prize (2007); Cole Prize (2002); Ostrowski Prize (2001); Fermat Prize (2001)
- Akshay Venkatesh (Ph.D., 2002) – professor, Institute for Advanced Study; Salem Prize (2007); Infosys Prize (2016); Ostrowski Prize (2017); Fields Medal (2018)
- Steven Zucker (Ph.D., 1974) – professor, Johns Hopkins University
- Gregg Zuckerman (Ph.D, 1975) – professor, Yale University
- Shinichi Mochizuki (Ph.D, 1992) – professor, Research Institute for Mathematical Sciences at Kyoto University

== See also ==
- MIT Department of Mathematics
- Princeton University Graduate School
