= Hugh Stott Taylor =

British chemist (1890–1974)

Sir Hugh Stott Taylor: KBE; FRS
- Born: 6 February 1890; St Helens, Merseyside, England, United Kingdom
- Died: 17 April 1974 (aged 84); Princeton, New Jersey
- Education: University of Liverpool
- Spouse: Elizabeth Agnes Sawyer (m. 1919)
- Children: 2
- Awards: Fellow of the Royal Society(1932); Remsen Award (1951)

Dean of Princeton University Graduate School
- In office 1945–1958
- Preceded by: Luther P. Eisenhart
- Succeeded by: Donald Ross Hamilton

Sir Hugh Stott Taylor KBE FRS (6 February 1890 – 17 April 1974) was an English chemist primarily interested in catalysis. In 1925, in a landmark contribution to catalytic theory, Taylor suggested that a catalysed chemical reaction is not catalysed over the entire solid surface of the catalyst but only at certain 'active sites' or centres. He also developed important methods for procuring heavy water during World War II and pioneered the use of stable isotopes in studying chemical reactions.

== Early life ==
Taylor was born in St Helens, Lancashire, England, in 1890, the son of glass technologist James and Ellen (née Stott) Taylor. He was educated at Cowley Grammar School in St Helens and then attended the University of Liverpool, where he received his BSc in 1909 and his MSc in 1910. Taylor then carried out three years of graduate work in Liverpool, after which he spent one year at the Nobel Institute in Stockholm in the laboratory of Svante Arrhenius and another at the Technische Hochschule in Hanover under Max Bodenstein. These studies earned him a PhD degree from the University of Liverpool in 1914.

== Basic research ==
Taylor showed that chemisorption may be an activated process, and occur slowly. Moreover, he conceived the idea that chemically active sites might be sparse on the surface of a catalyst and, hence, could be inhibited with relatively few molecules.

Taylor showed that hydrogen atoms are key intermediates of reactions involving H_{2} on metal surfaces and also discovered the conversion of heptane to toluene over chromium oxide.

== Protein structure ==
Taylor and a graduate student developed the first semi-realistic model of the α-helix, an element of protein secondary structure. An earlier model by Astbury had been shown to be physically implausible by Hans Neurath. Using physical models and chemical reasoning, Taylor sought to find a better model, which differs only slightly from the modern α-helix proposed by Linus Pauling and Robert Corey. Taylor reported their models at his Franklin Medal lecture (1941) and in press (1942).

== Work at Princeton ==
Taylor began at Princeton in 1914 as instructor in physical chemistry, and by 1915, was made an assistant professor. He was promoted to professor of physical chemistry in 1922 and became chair of the Chemistry Department at Princeton in 1926, where he served until 1951. In 1927, Taylor became the David B. Jones Professor of Chemistry at Princeton. Taylor also served as the dean of the graduate school at Princeton from 1945 to 1958.

As chair of chemistry from 1926 to 1951, Taylor developed the Chemistry Department at Princeton energetically and oversaw the construction of the Frick Chemical Laboratory.

He received the American Chemical Society's Remsen Award in the year of his retirement.

He was elected a Fellow of the Royal Society in May 1932.

== Personal life ==
He married Elizabeth Agnes Sawyer on 12 June 1919; They had two daughters.

Taylor was a devoted Catholic who helped to establish the Catholic chaplaincy at Princeton in 1928 and spoke publicly about the reconciliation of science and faith. He was made a Knight Commander of the Order of St. Gregory the Great (Papal) and a Commander of the Order of Leopold II of Belgium.

== Awards and legacy ==
Taylor was knighted by both Pope Pius XII and Queen Elizabeth II.

Taylor was elected to the American Philosophical Society in 1928.

The Hugh Stott Taylor Chair of Chemistry at Princeton was funded by an anonymous gift of $500K in honour of Taylor's contributions to Princeton.

== Death ==
Taylor died on 17 April 1974 in Princeton, New Jersey.
