= Rodney Priestley =

American chemical engineer

Rodney Dewayne Priestley
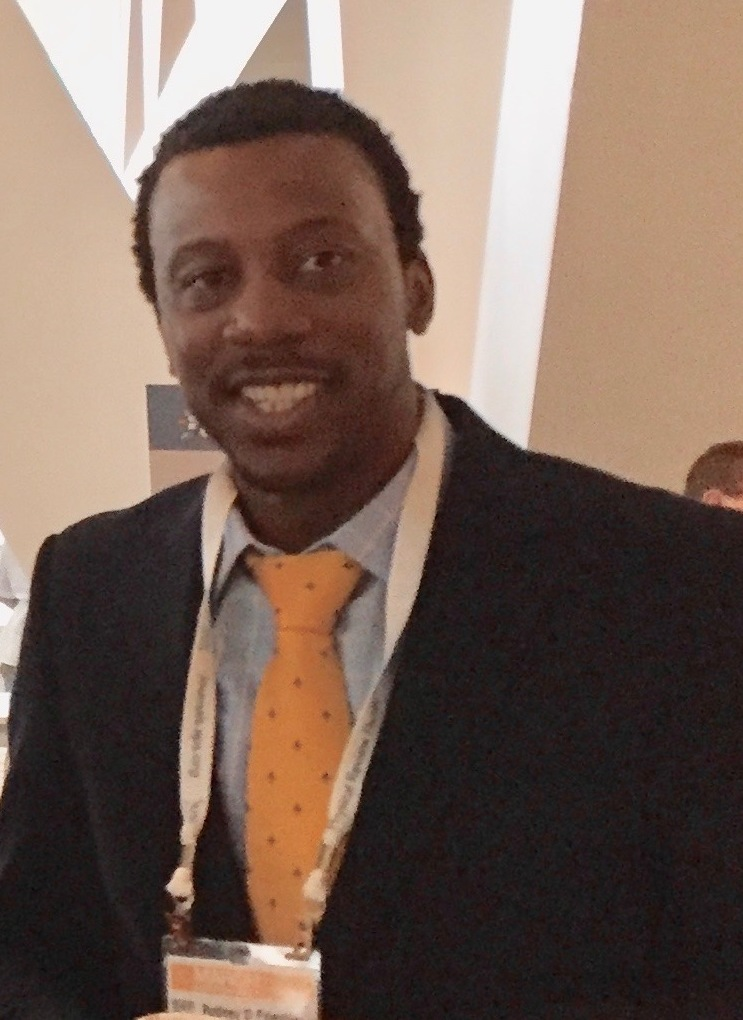
- Born: 1979 (age 46–47)
- Education: Northwestern University; Texas Tech University
- Scientific career
- Workplaces: Princeton University
- Thesis: Effects of nanoscale confinement and interfaces on the structural relaxation of amorphous polymers monitored at the molecular scale by fluorescence and dielectric spectroscopy (2008)

Rodney Dewayne Priestley (born 1979) is an American chemical engineer and professor at Princeton University. His research considers the phase transitions of polymers and their application in electronic devices and healthcare. In 2020 he was made the Princeton University Vice Dean of Innovation. He was named dean of The Graduate School effective June 1, 2022.

== Early life and education ==
Priestley grew up watching documentaries on National Geographic. He originally considered studying marine biology or geology. During high school he became increasingly interested in chemistry. Priestley eventually studied chemical engineering at Texas Tech University and graduated in 2003, where he competed in long jump. As part of a Research Experiences for Undergraduates programme at the University of Connecticut Priestley first encountered polymers, in the context of a project to develop artificial bone materials. He completed his doctoral degree at Northwestern University, where he studied nanoscale confinement of polymers. In particular, Priestley made use of fluorescence and dielectric spectroscopy to investigate how confinement and interfacial effects impacted the glass transition temperature and physical ageing of polymers. Priestley was a postdoctoral fellow at the Ecole Superieure de Physique et de Chimie Industrielles de la Ville de Paris (ESPCI).

== Research and career ==
In 2009 Priestley returned to the United States and joined the faculty at Princeton University. At Princeton, Priestley studies the nanoscale properties of materials, and how to tune these for novel device applications. He has continued to study the glass transition temperatures of polymers, with a focus on the controlled formation of thin films and nanocolloids. Priestley has studied the transition temperatures of substances that are composed of two or more polymers, attaching fluorescent reporting tags to the different components and using the brightness of the tag to infer whether the polymer is in a glassy or rubbery phase. As part of this work, Priestley studied plexiglas, a composite system of poly(methyl methacrylate) (PMMA) and poly(butyl methacrylate) (PBMA) that is found in coronary stents and paints. He combines experimental studies with computational investigations to better understand the distribution of the PMMA and PBMA throughout the plexiglass. Through his understanding of phase transitions, Priestley has shown that it is possible to precisely control nanostructures, and realised self-assembled biopolymers for use in artificial skin. Alongside his work on polymeric systems, Priestley has investigated nanoparticles, specifically engineered nanoscale zerovalent iron (enZVI) particles, as a means to clean groundwater. He proposed the use of Janus particles for the use in surfactant-free cleansing.

In 2019 Priestley was promoted to full professor, and was one of the first African-Americans to hold such a position at Princeton University. In 2020 he was made vice dean of innovation, and in 2022 named dean of The Graduate School. He is the founder of the science-based Cativa health cannabidiol. Priestley is an associate editor of JACS Au, an open-access journal.

== Awards and honours ==
- 2009 ACS Young Investigator Award
- 2011 National Science Foundation Career Award
- 2013 Presidential Early Career Award for Scientists and Engineers
- 2013 American Physical Society PPG/DPOLY Polymer Lecturer at the University of Sheffield
- 2014 National Academy of Engineering Frontiers of Engineering
- 2014 Purdue University Duncan and Suzanne Mellichamp Lecture
- 2014 American Society for Engineering Education Top 20 Under 40
- 2014 The Root Most Influential African Americans
- 2017 American Institute of Chemical Engineers MSED Owens Corning Early Career Award
- 2018 World Economic Forum Young Global Scientist
- 2020 American Physical Society John H. Dillion Medal
- 2020 American Chemical Society Macromolecules Young Investigator Award
- 2023 Fellow of the American Physical Society

== Selected publications ==
- Priestley, R. D. (2005-07-15). "Structural Relaxation of Polymer Glasses at Surfaces, Interfaces, and In Between". Science. 309 (5733): 456–459. Bibcode:2005Sci...309..456P. doi:10.1126/science.1112217. ISSN 0036-8075. PMID 16020732. S2CID 28796923.
- Rittigstein, Perla; Priestley, Rodney D.; Broadbelt, Linda J.; Torkelson, John M. (2007). "Model polymer nanocomposites provide an understanding of confinement effects in real nanocomposites". Nature Materials. 6 (4): 278–282. Bibcode:2007NatMa...6..278R. doi:10.1038/nmat1870. ISSN 1476-4660. PMID 17369831.
- Tam, Vivienne H.; Sosa, Chris; Liu, Rui; Yao, Nan; Priestley, Rodney D. (2016-12-30). "Nanomedicine as a non-invasive strategy for drug delivery across the blood brain barrier". International Journal of Pharmaceutics. 515 (1): 331–342. doi:10.1016/j.ijpharm.2016.10.031. ISSN 0378-5173. PMID 27769885.
