= Linda Broadbelt =

American chemist

Linda Jean Broadbelt
- Education: University of Delaware; Ohio State University
- Scientific career
- Thesis: Thermal stability of high performance polymers : integration of structure, reactivity and property (1995)
- Website: Broadbelt Lab

Linda Jean Broadbelt is an American chemical engineer who is the Sarah Rebecca Roland Professor and associate dean for research of the McCormick School of Engineering and Applied Science at Northwestern University. Her research considers kinetics modeling, polymerization and catalysis.

In 2019, she was elected a member of the National Academy of Engineering for contributions to complex kinetic modeling, particularly for understanding the pathways by which hydrocarbons and polymers undergo pyrolysis.

== Early life and education ==
Broadbelt was an undergraduate student in chemical and biomolecular engineering at Ohio State University. She was a graduate student in chemical engineering at the University of Delaware, where she studied the thermal stability of high performance polymers, working in the research group of Unidel Dan Rich Chair in Energy Michael Klein.

== Research and career ==
Broadbelt develops simulations to better understand the kinetics of hydrocarbon chemistry and reacting systems. She joined the faculty at Northwestern University in 1994. At Northwestern, she created computational models that automatically generate reaction mechanisms. In such models, molecules are represented as matrices, manipulations of which allow reactions to take place. Broadbelt has studied biofuels, polymers and nanocomposite materials.

In 2006, Broadbelt was awarded a fellowship from the Fulbright Program. Her fellowship allowed her to join Donna Blackmond at Imperial College London, where she investigated asymmetric catalysis and organocatalysts. In particular, Broadbelt made use of computational chemical methods to explore the asymmetric catalytic reactions that Blackmond worked on experimentally.

Broadbelt was awarded a United States Department of Energy Bioenergy Technologies Office multi-million dollar grant to create highly recyclable plastic. The plastics proposed by Broadbelt break down into harmless products.

== Academic service ==
From 2009 to 2017, Broadbelt served as chair of the department of chemical and biological engineering at Northwestern. In 2010, she was awarded a Sarah Rebecca Roland Professorship. She joined the advisory board of the University of Delaware Department of Chemical and Biomolecular Engineering in 2010. Broadbelt is a member of the American Institute of Chemical Engineers, where she has held various positions of leadership in the Catalysis and Reaction Engineering Division. She serves on the editorial board of the Royal Society of Chemistry journal Molecular Systems Design & Engineering.

== Awards and honors ==
- 1996 National Science Foundation CAREER Award
- 2006 Fulbright Distinguished Scholar
- 2006 Elected Fellow of the American Association for the Advancement of Science
- 2008 American Institute of Chemical Engineers Women in Chemical Engineering Mentorship Excellence Award
- 2017 Dorothy Ann and Clarence L. Ver Steeg Distinguished Research Fellowship Award
- 2018 American Institute of Chemical Engineers R. H. Wilhelm Award in Chemical Reaction Engineering
- 2018 American Chemical Society E. V. Murphree Award in Industrial and Engineering Chemistry
- 2019 Elected to the National Academy of Engineering
- 2020 Ohio State University Distinguished Alumni Award for Academic Excellence
- 2021 Elected to American Academy of Arts and Sciences

== Selected publications ==
- Adam M Feist; Christopher S Henry; Jennifer L Reed; et al. (26 June 2007). "A genome-scale metabolic reconstruction for Escherichia coli K-12 MG1655 that accounts for 1260 ORFs and thermodynamic information". Molecular Systems Biology. 3: 121. doi:10.1038/msb4100155. ISSN 1744-4292. PMC 1911197. PMID 17593909. Wikidata Q29615371.
- Rodney D Priestley; Christopher J Ellison; Linda J Broadbelt; John M Torkelson (1 July 2005). "Structural relaxation of polymer glasses at surfaces, interfaces, and in between". Science. 309 (5733): 456–459. Bibcode:2005Sci...309..456P. doi:10.1126/science.1112217. ISSN 0036-8075. PMID 16020732. S2CID 28796923. Wikidata Q51401492.
- Perla Rittigstein; Rodney D Priestley; Linda J Broadbelt; John M Torkelson (18 March 2007). "Model polymer nanocomposites provide an understanding of confinement effects in real nanocomposites". Nature Materials. 6 (4): 278–282. doi:10.1038/nmat1870. ISSN 1476-1122. PMID 17369831. S2CID 26577589. Wikidata Q51043887.
