= National Security League =

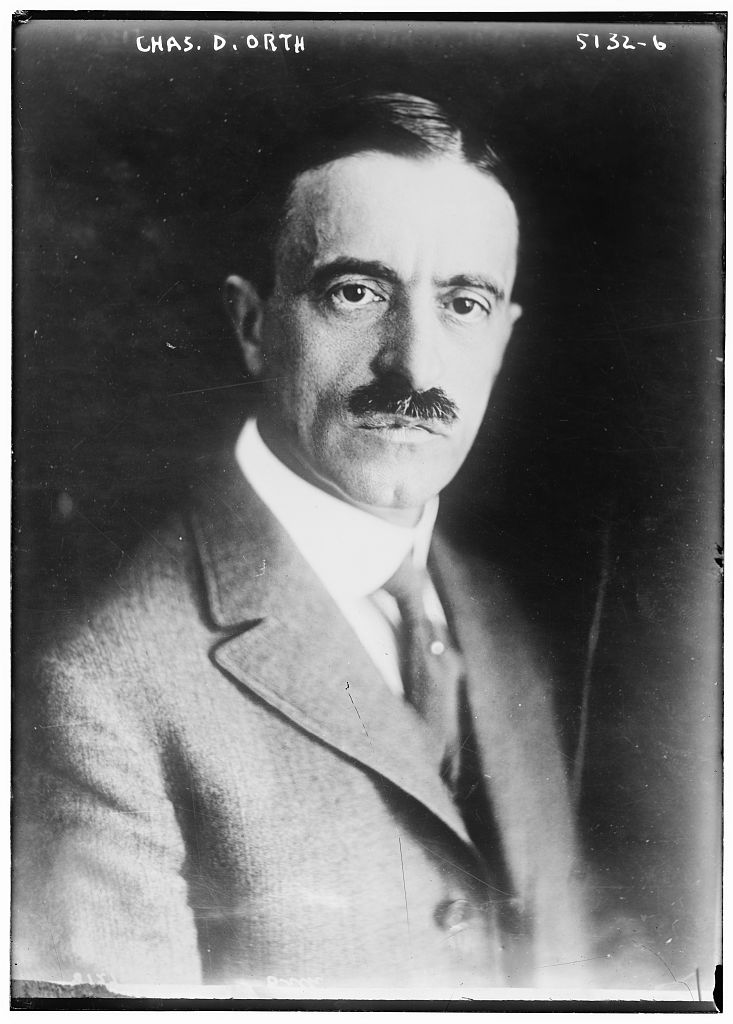
Charles Daniel Orth I in 1920

The National Security League (NSL) was an American patriotic, nationalistic, nonprofit, nonpartisan organization that supported a greatly-expanded military based upon universal service, the naturalization and Americanization of immigrants, Americanism, meritocracy, and government regulation of the economy to enhance national preparedness.

Many of the programs advocated by the NSL, such as a unified national defense agency, an interstate highway system, universal conscription, English as the official language, and a unified national budget, were highly influential. Although the organization had declined before it finally folded in 1942, many of its ideas would become national policy in the United States.

== Foundation ==
The National Security League was founded by attorney Solomon Stanwood Menken and General Leonard Wood in December 1914, but the impetus for the formation of the group was US Representative Augustus Peabody Gardner. For funding, Menken sought out publisher George Putnam. Putnam encouraged Menken to appoint an honorary president to lend the organization prestige and to give it access to respected speakers and additional funding. Menken and Putnam settled on Joseph Choate as the first such president. Menken served as the NSL's first executive director. A national committee was formed, which eventually had 47 members, with university presidents, bankers, cabinet secretaries, and state governors.

The National Security League emerged on the national political scene in the middle of June 1915 at a "Conference of Peace and Preparation," which it conducted in New York City. Although some participants in the conclave hailed from peace groups, the great majority of participants were advocates of military "preparedness." The conference cemented the NSL's place as a leader among the military preparedness movement during the months before American intervention in the war.

In August 1915, a splinter group formed the American Defense Society, largely composed of Republicans unhappy with the NSL's uncritical support of the administration of U.S. President Woodrow Wilson.

Despite that factionalism, by 1916, the NSL had more than 50,000 members in 155 chapters in 42 states.

== Beliefs and program ==
Membership application of the NSL, c. 1918, touting the organization's agenda of patriotic education and support for universal military training.

The NSL drew members and supporters from a wide range of the political spectrum, and its policies changed dramatically over time. Progressives, Democrats, and Republicans all supported the organization in its early years.

Initially, the NSL worked to indoctrinate school children and the public. Under the guise of encouraging the teaching of US history, the league worked to eliminate the teaching of foreign languages, especially German, and later Russian. It encouraged physical education in schools as a means of "strengthening American manhood" for war. By advocating civil defense, the league proselytized for more defense spending and a stronger national military. It opposed women's suffrage, which it viewed as a part of a "wave of effeminacy" threatening the nation.

This "Americanism" and universal conscription were meant not only to strengthen the military but also to weed out "religious or political dissenters, sexual 'deviants,' those who frequented prostitutes, and people convicted of crimes who had completed their punishment...." The goal was to create an elite meritocratic class that would take decision-making away from the electorate.

The NSL reached its highest point of influence in terms of its popular support and the adoption of its policies during World War I. It whipped up Germanophobia with its Committee on Patriotism Through Education, directed by Princeton University professor Robert McNutt McElroy, and it strongly supported the Espionage Act of 1917 and the Sedition Act of 1918. With the support of US Department of Justice, the NSL began to question the patriotism and the loyalty of thousands of Americans suspected of being pro-German or, later, communists. League supporters published newspaper stories or wrote letters to the editor alleging that labor unions, universities, some churches (particularly those with large ethnic German congregations), the League of Women Voters, and a host of other organizations were under communist control.

== Decline ==
The NSL lost much of its political influence after two incidents in 1918.

One incident happened in April 1918, when McElroy accused practically every citizen in Wisconsin of treason. McElroy was addressing some University of Wisconsin army junior cadets in the rain on the college's campus. The acoustics made it difficult to hear him, and the wet cadets fidgeted throughout his speech. McElroy grew increasingly angry as he spoke, convinced the cadets were ignoring him. Finally, McElroy, whether in exasperation or because truly believed so, accused the students and the university's faculty of treason. However, since no one could hear him, there was no response to his statement. McElroy then broadened his accusation to include the chief justice of the Wisconsin Supreme Court, who was also in attendance, and the entire population of the state of disloyalty as well. To make matters worse, McElroy published those accusations in a number of newspaper articles. When word of McElroy's statements were made known, the public and the press turned on the NSL and accused it of xenophobia and fanaticism. Many mainstream supporters of the League, unaware of the jingoistic tendencies of some of the more senior members of the organization's inner circle, quit in protest.

The other incident involved a massive political operation in the 1918 midterm elections. The League formed the first known political action committee in the United States and spent more than $100,000 to defeat US representatives who opposed its policies. The NSL established a rating system to analyze a variety of congressional votes on preparedness measures that it considered critical. However, many of the votes seemed to have little to do with national defense or ignored the complexities of congressional voting, which often involved parliamentary procedure, up-or-down voting, the amendment process, logrolling and agenda setting strategies. Many members of Congress who were for higher defense spending often scored quite low on the NSL's rating system. That did not appear to concern the League, which directed mass mailings and vituperative press campaigns against those members of Congress. The campaign appeared to have an effect, as a number of important members of Congress went down to defeat, and the Democrats lost control of the House.

During the lame duck session of Congress after the election, the Democrats sought to expose the practices of the NSL. U.S. House Speaker Champ Clark appointed a special investigative committee to investigate the League's actions. Not surprisingly, most of the committee's members had suffered the wrath of the League. The committee found that the NSL had violated the Federal Corrupt Practices Act.

Menken lost his position as executive director of the League after the House investigation.

With the close of World War I, the League became stridently anticommunist and reactionary. Honorary president Charles Lydecker, a New York state national guard colonel and the League's new executive director, began advocating an extreme form of property rights. Lydecker soon began attacking progressives and unions for being communists. Lydecker's successor, New York businessman Charles Daniel Orth I, subsequently pushed the League to advocate a quasi-fascist centralization of the national economy to further ensure the nation's security. Orth proposed even more repressive and less democratic measures, such as demanding "education campaigns" to indoctrinate Americanism into immigrants and children and a pogrom to drive radicals out of the nation's institutions of higher education. As more longtime League supporters, such as Samuel Gompers and Albert Bushnell Hart, withdrew their support, the League sank further into extremism and irrelevancy.

Lieutenant General Robert Lee Bullard became the NSL's last president, taking over in 1925.

The League went bankrupt in 1939. It survived on paper until 1942, with Bullard running it out of his Manhattan apartment. Bullard closed the League in 1942.

== Sources ==
- Asinof, Eliot. 1919: America's Loss of Innocence NY: Dutton, Inc., 1990. ISBN 1-55611-150-9
- Chambers II, John Whiteclay. To Raise an Army: The Draft Comes to Modern America NY: The Free Press, 1987.
- Coben, Stanley. A Study in Nativism: The American Red Scare of 1919–20 NY: Irvington Publishers, 1991.
- Cooper, Henry Allen. National Security League Washington, DC: U.S. Government Printing Office, 1919
- Damon, Allan L. "The Great Red Scare," in American Heritage 19:2 (February 1968)
- Edwards, John Carver. Patriots In Pinstripe: Men of the National Security League Washington, DC: University Press of America, 1982.
- Edwards, John Carver. "The Price of Political Innocence: The Role of the National Security League in the 1918 Congressional Election," in Military Affairs 42:4 (1978)
- "Epic Lobby" Time. September 23, 1929
- Feuerlicht, Roberta S. America's Reign of Terror: World War I, the Red Scare, and the Palmer Raids NY: Random House, 1971.
- Fischer, Nick. "The Founders of American Anti-Communism," in American Communist History 5:1 (June 2006).
- Franz, Manuel. "Preparedness Revisited: Civilian Societies and the Campaign for American Defense, 1914-1920," in Journal of the Gilded Age and Progressive Era 17:4 (2018): 663–676.
- Herzberg, David. "Thinking Through War: The Social Thought of Richard T. Ely, John R. Commons, and Edward A. Ross During the First World War," in Journal of the History of the Behavioral Sciences 37:2 (May 2001).
- Irwin, Mary Ann. "The Air is Becoming Full of War," in Pacific Historical Review 74:3 (August 2005).
- Murray, Robert K. Red Scare: A Study in National Hysteria, 1919–1920 Reprint ed. Westport, CT: Greenwood Publishing, 1990.
- "National Security League," in Encyclopedia of the Gilded Age and Progressive Era, John D. Buenker, Joseph Buenker, et al., eds. Armonk, NY: M.E. Sharpe, 2004.
- Pearlman, Michael. To Make Democracy Safe for America: Patricians and Preparedness in the Progressive Era Urbana: University of Illinois Press, 1984.
- Ricento, Thomas. "The Discursive Construction of Americanism." Discourse & Society 14:5 (2003)
- Rothbard, Murray N. "Wall Street, Banks, and American Foreign Policy," in World Market Perspective 1984
- Ruotsila, Markku. "Neoconservatism Prefigured: The Social Democratic League of America and the Anticommunists of the Anglo-American Right, 1917–21," in Journal of American Studies 40:2 (August 2006).
- "Russian Recruits." Time September 15, 1930.
- Shulman, Mark R. "The Progressive Era Origins of the National Security Act," in Dickinson Law Review 104 (Winter 2000)
- "Theodore Roosevelt Dies Suddenly at Oyster Bay Home," New York Times January 6, 1919
- U.S. House of Representatives. Hearing Before a Special Committee of the House of Representatives, Sixty-Fifth Congress, Third Session on H. Res. 469 and H. Res. 476 To Investigate and Make Report as to the Officers, Membership, Financial Support, Expenditures, General Character, Activities, and Purposes of the National Security League, A Corporation of New York, and of Any Associated Organizations. Washington, DC: Government Printing Office, 1918.
- Van Schaack, Eric. "The Coming of the Hun! American Fears of a German Invasion, 1918," Journal of American Culture 28:3 (September 2005).
- Ward, Robert D. "The Origin and Activities of the National Security League, 1914-1919," The Mississippi Valley Historical Review 47:1 (June 1960), pp. 51–65. In JSTOR.
- Zeiger, Susan. "The Schoolhouse vs. the Armory: U.S. Teachers and the Campaign Against Militarism in the Schools, 1914-1918," in Journal of Women's History 15:2 (Summer 2003)
