= S. Stanwood Menken =

American lawyer (1870–1954)

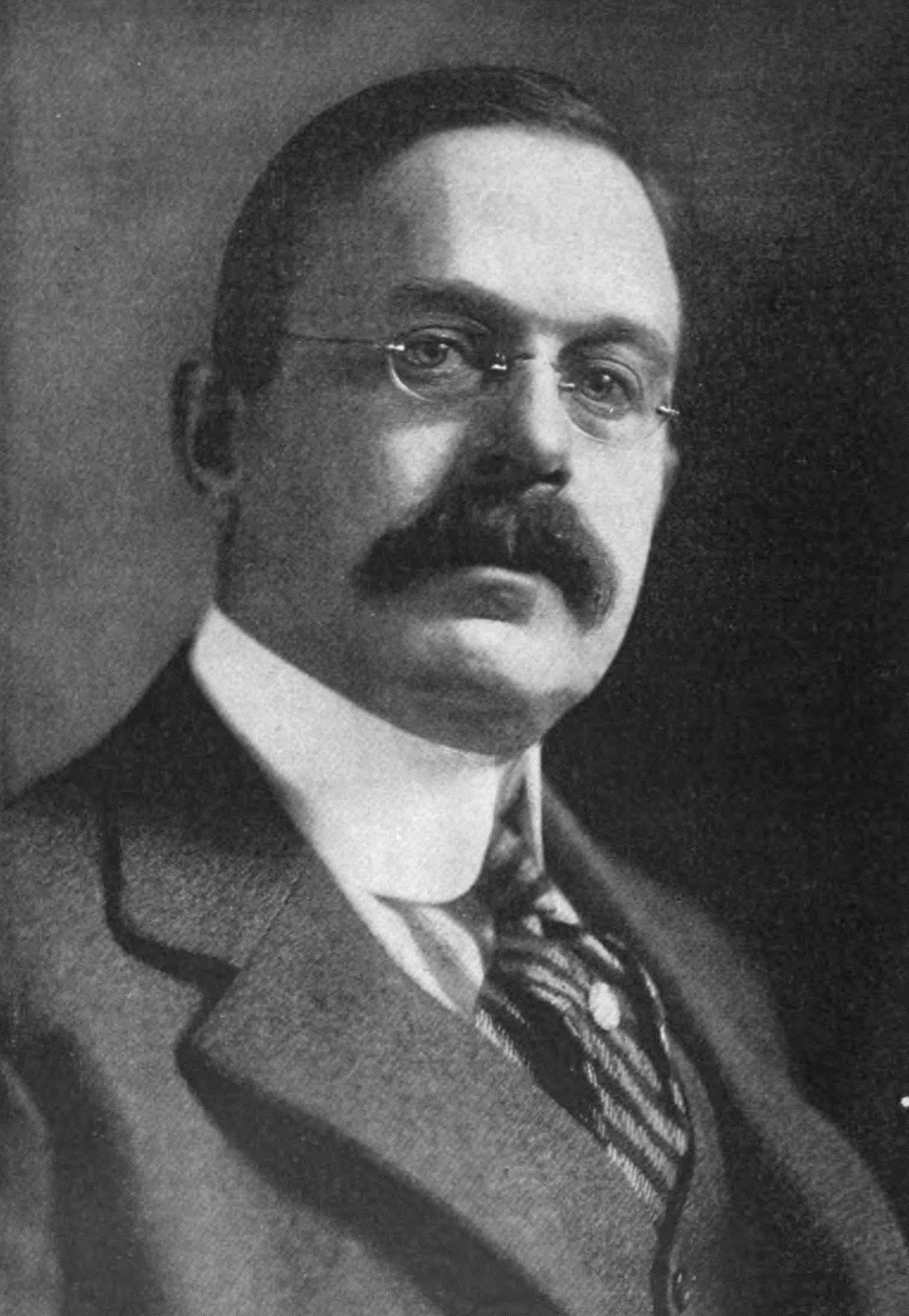
- Born: 1870; Memphis, Tennessee
- Died: 1954 (aged 83–84)
- Education: City College of New York; Cornell University (1890); Columbia University
- Children: Arthur Menken
- Parent: Nathan Menken

Solomon Stanwood Menken (1870 - 1954) was an attorney in the United States best known for having founded the National Security League.

== Biography ==
Menken was born in Memphis, Tennessee in 1870 to Nathan Menken, who owned a dry goods store. The family moved to New York City when Menken was a boy. He attended the City College of New York but transferred to Cornell University, graduating in 1890. He later received a Bachelor of Laws from Columbia University.

Although his parents were Jewish, Menken converted to Christianity and started using his middle name, Stanwood. He married a wealthy New York City socialite; they had one son, Arthur Menken, who became a successful newsreel cameraman for Paramount Pictures and a war correspondent who would later film the Nanking Massacre and the Spanish Civil War).

Menken became a successful corporate lawyer with the firm of Philbin, Beckman and Menken, whose clients included J.P. Morgan.

Menken became active in progressive politics. He helped found New York City's Reform Club and supported the "single tax" movement. He ran for office in New York City in 1896 on a ticket with noted politician Henry George. A longtime Democrat, he helped found the Democratic League of New York in September 1909, and for many years raised money and helped support the party in elections.

He began supporting liberal Republicans and Progressives in 1912, and campaigned for Theodore Roosevelt and Robert M. La Follette, Sr.

A noted Anglophile, he was in Great Britain with his wife Gretchen (née von Briesen) when World War I began, and was deeply distressed by Britain's inability to mobilize quickly for war. They returned to the United States aboard the RMS Olympic on August 29, 1914.

In December 1914, he helped form the National Security League, a nonprofit, nonpartisan organization dedicated to higher military budgets, universal conscription and tight regulation of the economy. He became the organization's first executive director from January 1915 to May 1917. He took over as president from May 1917 to June 1918, but was forced out after the League became involved in a congressional electoral scandal.

During his time with the League, Menken advocated a centralized economy protected by high tariffs and taxes and an activist, expanded role for the federal government. He favored the creation of a Federal Reserve Bank and the creation of state-run public corporation to produce and deliver essential goods and services such as milk and coal production and the provision of electricity.

After his departure, the League turned dramatically rightward politically. In November 1921, Menken and other centrists took control of the League again. As president, he attempted to guide it toward more centrist policies, but was largely unsuccessful.

Menken resigned from the League in February 1925, and turned over the presidency and executive directorship to Robert Lee Bullard. Afterward, he devoted most of his time to his corporate practice. Bullard stripped him of his League membership in 1930 when Menken advocated diplomatic recognition of the Soviet Union.

He spent the remainder of his life practicing law, and staying somewhat active in Democratic politics.

He died in 1954.
