= Luther P. Eisenhart =

American mathematician (1876–1965)

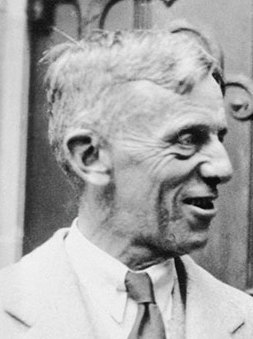
- c.1933
- Born: Luther Pfahler Eisenhart; 13 January 1876; York, Pennsylvania, US
- Died: 28 October 1965 (aged 89); Princeton, New Jersey, US
- Education: Johns Hopkins University
- Scientific career
- Fields: Mathematics
- Workplaces: Princeton University

Dean of Princeton University Graduate School
- In office 1933–1945
- Preceded by: Augustus Trowbridge
- Succeeded by: Hugh Stott Taylor

Luther Pfahler Eisenhart (13 January 1876 – 28 October 1965) was an American mathematician, best known today for his contributions to semi-Riemannian geometry.

== Life ==
Eisenhart was born in York, Pennsylvania, and graduated from Gettysburg College in 1896. He earned his doctorate in 1900 at Johns Hopkins University, where he was influenced (at long range) by the work of Gaston Darboux and at shorter range by that of Thomas Craig. During the next two decades, Eisenhart's research focused on moving frames after the French school, but around 1921 took a different turn when he became enamored of the mathematical challenges and entrancing beauty of a new theory of gravitation, Albert Einstein's general theory of relativity.

Eisenhart played a central role in American mathematics in the early twentieth century. He served as chairman of the mathematics department at Princeton University and later as Dean of the Graduate School there from 1933 to 1945. He is widely credited with guiding the development in America of the mathematical background needed for the further development of general relativity, through his influential textbooks and his personal interaction with Albert Einstein, Oswald Veblen, and John von Neumann at the nearby Institute for Advanced Study, as well as with gifted students such as Abraham Haskel Taub.

In the early 40s he chaired the "Reference Committee", formed in June 1940 for editors of scientific journals to send the papers submitted to them, in order to check that the papers did not contain results (especially regarding nuclear physics) whose public knowledge could be detrimental to the US war efforts.

Eisenhart was an elected member of both the American Philosophical Society and the United States National Academy of Sciences.

Eisenhart indirectly contributed to popularization of science. In 1939, as Dean of the Graduate School, he hosted a tea for incoming students including Richard Feynman. When asked by Eisenhart's wife "would you like cream or lemon in your tea?", Feynman, uncomfortable in the situation, stammered "both please." This elicited the condescending response "Surely You're Joking, Mr. Feynman!" a phrase later immortalized as the title of the future Nobel Laureate's best selling memoir.

== Publications ==
- Eisenhart, Luther Pfahler (1923). Transformations of Surfaces. Princeton: Princeton University Press. LCCN 62011699.
- Eisenhart, Luther Pfahler (1933). Continuous Groups of Transformations. Princeton: Princeton University Press. LCCN 61003361/L.
- Eisenhart, Luther Pfahler (1926). Riemannian Geometry (PDF). Princeton: Princeton University Press. OCLC 5836010.
- Eisenhart, Luther Pfahler (1939). Coordinate Geometry. Dover Publishing.
- Eisenhart, Luther Pfahler (1927). Non-Riemannian geometry (PDF). New York: American Mathematical Society.
- Eisenhart, Luther Pfahler (1909). A treatise on the differential geometry of curves and surfaces. Boston: Ginn and Company.

== Notes ==
Academic offices
Preceded by Henry Burchard Fine	Dod Professor of Mathematics at Princeton University; 1929–1945	Succeeded by Emil Artin
