= Sun-Yung Alice Chang =

Taiwanese American mathematician (born 1948)

- 張聖容
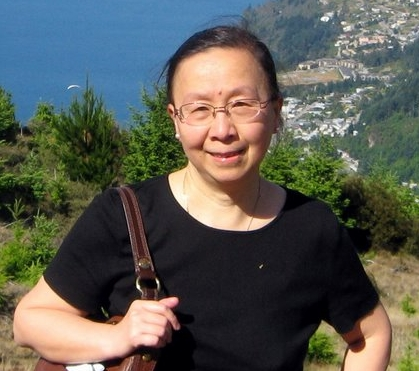
- Sun-Yung Alice Chang, 2007
- Born: 1948 (age 77–78); Xi'an, China
- Education: National Taiwan University (BS); University of California, Berkeley (PhD)
- Spouse: Paul C. Yang
- Scientific career
- Fields: Mathematics
- Workplaces: University of California, Los Angeles; Princeton University
- Thesis: On the Structure of Some Douglas Subalgebras (1974)
- Doctoral advisor: Donald Sarason

Sun-Yung Alice Chang (Chinese: 張聖容; pinyin: Zhāng Shèngróng, Hakka: Chông Sṳn-yùng, [t͡soŋ sɨn juŋ]; born 1948) is a Taiwanese-American mathematician specializing in aspects of mathematical analysis ranging from harmonic analysis and partial differential equations to differential geometry. She is the Eugene Higgins Professor of Mathematics at Princeton University.

== Life ==
Chang was born in Xian, China, in 1948 and grew up in Taiwan. She received her Bachelor of Science (B.S.) degree in 1970 from National Taiwan University and her Ph.D. in 1974 from the University of California, Berkeley. At Berkeley, Chang wrote her thesis on the study of bounded analytic functions. Chang became a full professor at UCLA in 1980 before moving to Princeton in 1998.

== Career and research ==
Chang's research interests include the study of geometric types of nonlinear partial differential equations and problems in isospectral geometry. Working with her husband Paul Yang and others, she produced contributions to differential equations in relation to geometry and topology.

She teaches at Princeton University as of 1998. Before that, she held visiting positions at University of California-Berkeley; Institute for Advanced Study, Princeton, N.J.; and Swiss Federal Institute of Technology, Zurich, Switzerland. She served at Swiss Federal Institute of Technology as a visiting professor in 2015.

In 2004, she was interviewed by Yu Kiang Leong for Creative Minds, Charmed Lives: Interviews at Institute for Mathematical Sciences, National University of Singapore, and she declared:

«In the mathematical community, we should leave room for people who want to do work in their own way. Mathematical research is not just a scientific approach; the nature of mathematics is sometimes close to that of art. Some people want individual character and an individual way of working things out. They should be appreciated too. There should be room for single research and collaborative research».

Chang's life was profiled in the 2017 documentary film Girls who fell in love with Math.

== Service and honors ==
- Sloan Foundation Research Fellowship, 1979–1981
- Invited speaker at the International Congress of Mathematicians in Berkeley, 1986
- Vice president of the American Mathematical Society, 1989-1991
- Ruth Lyttle Satter Prize in Mathematics of the American Mathematical Society, 1995
- Guggenheim Fellowship, 1998
- Plenary Speaker at the International Congress of Mathematicians in Beijing, 2002
- Member, American Academy of Arts and Sciences, 2008
- Honorary Degree, UPMC, 2013
- Fellow, National Academy of Sciences, 2009
- Fellow, Academia Sinica, 2012
- Fellow, American Mathematical Society, 2015
- Fellow, Association for Women in Mathematics, 2019
- MSRI Simons Professor, 2015-2016

== Publications ==
- Chang, Sun-Yung A.; Yang, Paul C. Conformal deformation of metrics on $S^2$. J. Differential Geom. 27 (1988), no. 2, 259–296.
- Chang, Sun-Yung Alice; Yang, Paul C. Prescribing Gaussian curvature on $S^2$. Acta Math. 159 (1987), no. 3–4, 215–259.
- Chang, Sun-Yung A.; Yang, Paul C. Extremal metrics of zeta function determinants on 4-manifolds. Ann. of Math. (2) 142 (1995), no. 1, 171–212.
- Chang, Sun-Yung A.; Gursky, Matthew J.; Yang, Paul C. The scalar curvature equation on 2- and 3-spheres. Calc. Var. Partial Differential Equations 1 (1993), no. 2, 205–229.
- Chang, Sun-Yung A.; Gursky, Matthew J.; Yang, Paul C. An equation of Monge-Ampère type in conformal geometry, and four-manifolds of positive Ricci curvature. Ann. of Math. (2) 155 (2002), no. 3, 709–787.
- Chang, S.-Y. A.; Wilson, J. M.; Wolff, T. H. Some weighted norm inequalities concerning the Schrödinger operators. Comment. Math. Helv. 60 (1985), no. 2, 217–246.
- Carleson, Lennart; Chang, Sun-Yung A. On the existence of an extremal function for an inequality of J. Moser. Bull. Sci. Math. (2) 110 (1986), no. 2, 113–127.
- Chang, Sun-Yung A.; Fefferman, Robert Some recent developments in Fourier analysis and $H^p$-theory on product domains. Bull. Amer. Math. Soc. (N.S.) 12 (1985), no. 1, 1–43.
- Chang, Sun-Yung A.; Fefferman, Robert A continuous version of duality of $H^1$ with BMO on the bidisc. Ann. of Math. (2) 112 (1980), no. 1, 179–201.
