= Henry Burchard Fine =

American mathematician (1858–1928)

- Born: September 14, 1858; Chambersburg, Pennsylvania, U.S.
- Died: December 22, 1928 (aged 70); Princeton, New Jersey, U.S.
- Education: University of Leipzig; Princeton University
- Children: John B. Fine; May Margaret Fine
- Relatives: Jean Spahr (sister)
- Scientific career
- Fields: Mathematics
- Workplaces: Princeton University
- Thesis: On the singularities of curves of double curvature (1886)
- Doctoral advisors: Felix Klein; Carl Neumann

Henry Burchard Fine (September 14, 1858 – December 22, 1928) was an American university dean and mathematician.

== Life and career ==
Henry Burchard Fine (1858 – 1928) played a critical role in modernizing the American university and raising American mathematics "from a state of approximate nullity to one verging on parity with the European nations". This tribute in Oswald Veblen’s obituary [see in "Obituary" below] accurately recognized Fine’s role both in training American mathematicians to provide international leadership to this field and in building Princeton University's reputation in mathematics and science. Fine’s efforts contributed greatly toward making Princeton the site of Albert Einstein's first North American lectures, and eventually his home.

Fine began his time as a Princeton undergraduate studying Greek and Latin, but a mathematics tutor, George B. Halstead, convinced him to switch his considerable talents to mathematics. He ranked highest academically in his Class of 1880 for all four years, during which he caught the attention of President James McCosh. As a result, Fine was among a small group of highly talented undergraduates whom McCosh invited to his house for informal seminars and nurtured as future faculty.

After graduation, Fine remained at Princeton (then called the College of New Jersey) for a year of post-graduate work followed by three more years as a tutor. Then, as Germany was the leading center of mathematics scholarship, he went to the University of Leipzig to study mathematics with Felix Klein under whom he earned his PhD in one year.

He returned to Princeton as an Assistant Professor of Mathematics in 1885 and soon established himself as a leader in the faculty, ultimately named the Dod Professor of Mathematics in 1898. In addition, his reputation beyond Princeton grew through publications and his role as one of the founding members of the American Mathematical Society. However, it was reviving his undergraduate friendship with Woodrow Wilson (Class of 1879) that led to his subsequent impact on Princeton and American scholarship. Fine, (Class of 1880), one year behind Wilson, assisted him as a junior and then succeeded him as Managing Editor of the Princetonian, the campus's student newspaper. When Wilson joined the Princeton faculty in 1890 their relationship resumed, beginning a close and consequential lifelong friendship.

After McCosh’s retirement in 1888, the College of New Jersey’s new President, Francis Landey Patton, was satisfied to preside over what he called "the best country club" in the country. However, the young faculty whom McCosh had nurtured, including Fine, and their allies on the Board of Trustees grew restive and pushed him out in favor of Wilson in 1902. Wilson quickly chose Fine to be his right-hand man as the Dean of the College. They set about transforming Princeton by raising academic standards, revising the curriculum, and replacing several senior faculty members. Wilson convinced the Trustees to hire 50 new young faculty members he called ‘preceptors’. The addition of this large number of young, enthusiastic junior faculty had a significant impact on the quality, focus and seriousness of Princeton at both the undergraduate and graduate school levels.

Because Wilson lacked interest in science and mathematics, he delegated the preceptor appointments to Fine, giving him the opportunity to transform Princeton's programs in those fields. Fine had an extraordinary ability to identify talented individuals in these fields and a commitment to promoting their careers. His initial preceptorial appointments all went on to become respected mathematicians and when some vacancies developed, he replaced them with similar young talent. He also recruited established American and European mathematicians. By 1911, Princeton’s Department of Mathematics ranked as one of the top three in America and had become the home of the prestigious Annals of Mathematics.

In addition, Fine jump-started Princeton’s weak science departments by recruiting some leading scientists, including mathematical physicist James Jeans , physicist Owen Willans Richardson, and biologist Edwin Grant Conklin Edwin Conklin. He nurtured younger scientists such as astronomer Henry Norris Russell. His time was increasingly focused on administration and the controversies that eventually dragged down the Wilson presidency. He and Wilson won one battle, gaining control of the Graduate School from Wilson’s archenemy, Andrew Fleming West. While ceremonial leadership remained with West, Fine became the dominant force in turning Princeton into a modern research university.

However, Wilson lost his attempt to reduce the influence of Princeton’s undergraduate ‘eating clubs’ and to have the Graduate College constructed in the middle of campus. When Wilson left to enter politics, Fine became acting president in all but name, while also serving as President of the American Mathematical Society. Although Fine had loyally supported Wilson’s losing proposals and was a leading candidate to become president, he then loyally supported President John Grier Hibben for the rest of his career. With Hibben's ascendance, Fine became in reality what he had long been, Dean of the Departments of Science, a position he held until his death 1928. He remained deeply loyal to Princeton, turning down offers of the presidency of M.I.T. and Johns Hopkins University as well as Wilson’s offers to name him Ambassador to Germany and to the Federal Reserve Board.

Fine continued teaching, publishing leading textbooks and occasional articles, and building his departments. The Department of Mathematics’ prestige led, in 1921, to it hosting Albert Einstein’s first American lectures. In the 1920s, Fine was particularly successful in raising money from the General Education Board and Rockefeller Foundation to support Princeton’s growing science programs. As a consequence, in the 1920s only the University of Chicago attracted more National Research Council Fellowships and no Princeton application was rejected. In addition to his duties as Dean of Science, Fine served on numerous campus committees, especially chairing the Board of Athletic Control. In the community he served on and chaired the Board of Education for many years.

His sister had founded Miss Fine’s School and his brother founded Princeton Preparatory School. Bicycling to visit the latter on a dark December evening in 1928 he was struck and killed by a car. In response, his close friend and wealthy Princeton Trustee, Thomas D. Jones, funded construction of Fine Hall, arguably the finest mathematics building in the country. Jones' response to cost overruns was "nothing is too good for Harry Fine. Finished in 1931, Fine Hall served as the first home of the new Institute of Advanced Study , and of its most distinguished faculty member, Albert Einstein, until its separate building was completed in 1939. The other founding faculty member, and the person who convinced the funders to situate the IAS in Princeton, was Oswald Veblen, one of Fine’s original preceptors. Whereas he had been drawn to Germany for his PhD in the 1880s, shortly after his death, Princeton University and the Institute of Advanced Study surpassed Göttingen as the world’s center of mathematical physics.

Fine was elected to the American Philosophical Society in 1897. He was one of the founders of the American Mathematical Society and served as its President in 1911–1912. Among his publications were:

- Euclid's Elements (1891)
- The Number System of Algebra (1891; second edition, 1903) PDF/DjVu copy from Internet Archive.
- A College Algebra (1904)
- Coördinate Geometry, with Henry Dallas Thompson (1909) PDF Copy from University of Michigan Historical Math Collection.
- Calculus (1927)

== Obituary ==
- Oswald Veblen, Henry Burchard Fine—In memoriam, Bulletin of the American Mathematical Society 35, (1929), pp. 726–730.

== Sources ==
- O'Connor, John J.; Robertson, Edmund F., "Henry Burchard Fine", MacTutor History of Mathematics Archive, University of St Andrews
- Henry Burchard Fine at the Mathematics Genealogy Project

Academic offices
Preceded by Dr. John Thomas Duffield	Dod Professor of Mathematics at Princeton University; 1891–1928	Succeeded by Luther P. Eisenhart
