= Augustus Trowbridge =

American academic

- Born: January 2, 1870; Brooklyn, New York, U.S.
- Died: March 14, 1934 (aged 64); Taormina, Sicily, Italy
- Resting place: Princeton Cemetery
- Education: University of Berlin (PhD)
- Occupations: Educator; physicist
- Employers: University of Michigan; University of Wisconsin–Madison; Princeton University; U.S. Army Signal Corps; Rockefeller Foundation
- Spouse: Sarah Esther Fulton (m. 1893)
- Children: 3
- Awards: Distinguished Service Medal; Legion of Honour; Order of St. Olav

Dean of Princeton University Graduate School
- In office 1928–1933
- Preceded by: Andrew Fleming West
- Succeeded by: Luther P. Eisenhart

Academic background
- Thesis: The Reflecting Power of Metals
- Military career
- Allegiance: United States
- Branch: U.S. Army Signal Corps
- Rank: Lieutenant colonel
- Conflicts: World War I

Augustus Trowbridge (January 2, 1870 – March 14, 1934) was a physics professor and dean at Princeton University.

== Early life ==
Augustus Trowbridge was born on January 2, 1870, in Brooklyn, New York, to Cornelia Polhemus (née Robinson) and George Alfred Trowbridge. He attended St. Paul's Military Academy, Phillips Academy Andover, and had tutors in France and Italy.

Trowbridge attended Columbia University from 1890 to 1893 and was taught by Mihajlo Pupin, but did not graduate. At Columbia, he became a member of the Delta Phi fraternity. He withdrew from Columbia and accepted a temporary position as a civil engineer at the Chicago World's Fair. He then attended the University of Berlin and received a Doctor of Philosophy in 1898. His thesis was titled The Reflecting Power of Metals.

== Personal life ==
Trowbridge married Sarah Esther Fulton on September 20, 1893. She was the daughter of clergyman Justin Dewey Fulton of St. Louis, Boston and Brooklyn. Together, they had three children: George, Cornelius and Katherine. Katherine died from the Spanish flu on October 7, 1918.

He spoke fluent French, German, and Italian.

== Career ==
From 1898 to 1900, he was a physics instructor at the University of Michigan. He took over some teaching duties for Henry Smith Carhart when he became sick. In 1900, he accepted an invitation to become an assistant professor of mathematical physics at the University of Wisconsin, following his friend Robert W. Wood. He then worked with Charles E. Mendenhall on the optical properties of materials. In 1903, he was promoted to full professor.

In the fall of 1906, Trowbridge joined Princeton University as a physics professor. He remained there until 1917. Prior to the start of World War I, Trowbridge was elected to the National Research Council. He was nominated by Mendenhall and Robert A. Millikan to the American Sound and Flash Ranging Service. He was commissioned as a major of the U.S. Army Signal Corps. Trowbridge went to France in September 1917 and studied flash and sound ranging operations on the French and British fronts. He was transferred to the Engineers Corps and was promoted to lieutenant colonel.

Trowbridge was elected to the American Philosophical Society in 1911. In 1919, he returned to Princeton and was elected to the National Academy of Sciences. He left Princeton to serve as an executive director in Paris of the International Education Board of the Rockefeller Foundation from 1925 to 1928. In June 1928, he succeeded Andrew Fleming West as the dean of Princeton's Graduate School. He resigned in 1932 citing ill health, but was not replaced until 1933 by Luther P. Eisenhart.

== Death ==
Trowbridge died on March 14, 1934, in Taormina, Sicily, Italy while on vacation with his wife. He was buried on March 29, 1934, in Princeton Cemetery.

== Awards ==
- Distinguished Service Medal, July 9, 1918
- Legion of Honour, April 4, 1919
- Distinguished Service Order by King George V, July 18, 1919
- Order of St. Olav
