= Thomas Craig (mathematician) =

Mathematics professor at Johns Hopkins University

Thomas Craig (1855–1900) was an American mathematician. He was a professor at Johns Hopkins University and a proponent of the methods of differential geometry.

He was born December 20, 1855, in Pittston, Pennsylvania. His father Alexander Craig immigrated from Scotland, and worked as an engineer in the mining industry.

Craig first studied civil engineering at Lafayette College in Pennsylvania, where a teacher William J. Bruce was a mentor to him. Thomas took his C.E. degree in 1875. He taught high school in Newton, New Jersey while continuing to study mathematics. He entered into correspondence with Benjamin Peirce and Peter Guthrie Tait.

He was one of the prime movers of Johns Hopkins University when it was launched by Daniel Coit Gilman in 1876. Craig and George Bruce Halsted were the first Hopkins Fellows in mathematics. James Joseph Sylvester had been invited to lead a graduate program in mathematics but would only be doing that. Craig was needed to teach differential calculus and integral calculus. The first year there were only fifteen students studying mathematics, but by 1883 there were 35.

In 1878 Craig took his Ph.D. degree with a dissertation The Representation of One Surface Upon Another, and Some Points in the theory of the Curvature of Surfaces. He became an instructor at Johns Hopkins that year, but also took up work at the United States Coast and Geodetic Survey. In that capacity he produced the text for A Treatise on Projections for workers at the Geodetic Survey. Craig and Simon Newcomb read Leo Königsberger's Theory of Functions also.

Craig married Louise Alford, daughter of General Benjamin Alvord, on May 4, 1880. The couple raised two daughters, Alisa and Ethel.

After 1881 Craig was totally committed to Johns Hopkins, particularly anticipating Arthur Cayley's lectures on theta functions when he came over for the Spring semester of 1882. Besides the calculus courses, Craig taught differential equations, elliptic functions, elasticity, partial differential equations, calculus of variations, definite integrals, mechanics, dynamics, hydrodynamics, sound, spherical harmonics, and Bessel functions.

When the American Journal of Mathematics was launched in 1877 Craig was tasked with recording expenses, as these were underwritten by Johns Hopkins University. His report at the end of 1882 gave the total just under ten thousand dollars.

Craig died May 8, 1900. With information supplied by Luther P. Eisenhart, Simon Newcomb wrote the notice in the American Journal of Mathematics

== Works ==
Craig wrote the following contributions to the American Journal of Mathematics:

- 1880: AJM 3:114 to 27: Orthomorphic projections of an ellipsoid on a sphere
- 1881: AJM 4: 297 to 320: On certain metric properties of surfaces
- 1881: AJM 4:358 to 78: The counter-pedal surface of an ellipsoid
- 1882: AJM 5:62 to 75: Some elliptic function formula
- 1882: AJM 5:76 to 8: Note on the counter-pedal surface of an ellipsoid
- 1882: Crelle's Journal 93:251 to 70: On the parallel surface to an ellipsoid
- 1883: Crelle's 94:162 to 70: Note on parallel surfaces
- 1879: Wave and Vortex Motion, D. Van Nostrand Publishing, from Google Books
- 1882: A Treatise on Projections from University of Michigan Historical Math Collection
- 1889: A Treatise on Linear Differential Equations, John Wiley & Sons, from Historical Math Monographs at Cornell University

== Notes and references ==
- Karen Parshall & David E. Rowe (1994) The Emergence of the American Mathematical Research Community, Chapter 2: "J.J. Sylvester and Johns Hopkins", ISBN 0821809075.
- F.P. Matz (1901) Professor Thomas Craig, American Mathematical Monthly 8:183 to 7, from Jstor early content.
- Thomas Craig at the Mathematics Genealogy Project
