= John M. Torkelson =

American material science researcher

John Mark Torkelson is an American physicist.

Torkelson earned his bachelor's degree from the University of Wisconsin–Madison in 1978 and doctorate at the University of Minnesota in 1983. He holds the Walter P. Murphy Professorship in Chemical and Biological Engineering and Materials Science and Engineering at Northwestern University. In 1999, Torkelson was elected a fellow of the American Physical Society "[f]or imaginative and successful applications of fluorescence spectroscopy to polymer physics issues ranging from free volume to free radical polymerization."
