= Andrew Fleming West =

American classicist

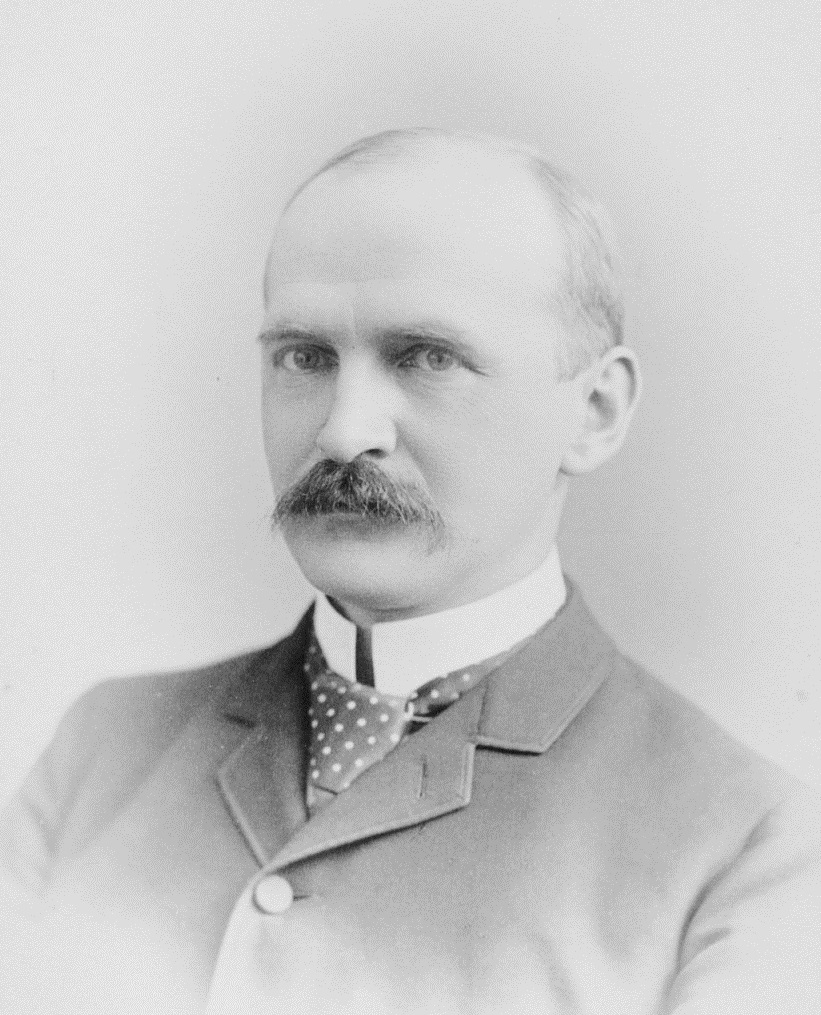
- West in 1889.
- Born: Andrew Fleming West; May 17, 1853; Allegheny, Pennsylvania, U.S.
- Died: December 27, 1943 (aged 90)
- Monuments: Cast bronze statue of West made by R. Tait McKenzie in 1928 at Princeton University
- Education: Princeton University
- Occupations: Classicist; Dean
- Spouse: Lucy Marshall Fitz Randolph

Dean of Princeton University Graduate School
- In office 1900–1928
- Succeeded by: Augustus Trowbridge

Andrew Fleming West (May 17, 1853 – December 27, 1943) was an American classicist, and first dean of the Graduate School at Princeton University.

== Biography ==
West was born in Allegheny, Pennsylvania on May 17, 1853. He studied at Princeton University from 1870 to 1874. In his final year at Princeton he founded the Princeton Glee Club. After graduating, he taught Latin at a high school in Cincinnati for six years. He then went to Europe to carry out academic study, before taking up a position as principal of the Morris Academy in Morristown, New Jersey.

In 1883, West accepted a position as professor of Latin at Princeton University, where he served as Giger Professor of Latin for forty-five years until his retirement in 1928. In December 1900 West was appointed as the first dean of the newly founded Graduate School at Princeton University. As dean, he was instrumental in creating the Princeton University Graduate College, a residential college for graduate students. After a number of setbacks, and a disagreement with Woodrow Wilson (President of Princeton University, 1902–1910) about the siting of the proposed graduate college, it finally became a reality with the death of Isaac C. Wyman in 1910, who bequeathed $800,000 for the purposes of founding a graduate college. The graduate college was dedicated on October 22, 1913. He remained dean until 1928.

West was president of the American Philological Association in 1902. He received the honorary degree Doctor of Letters (D.Litt.) from the University of Oxford in October 1902, in connection with the tercentenary of the Bodleian Library. Considered the leading advocate for classics in his day, West was also the founding president of the American Classical League.

In 1889, West married Lucy Fitz Randolph, daughter of New Jersey Governor Theodore Fitz Randolph. After giving birth to their only child, Randolph, in 1889, Lucy suffered a mental breakdown and was hospitalized until her death in 1929.

A cast bronze statue of West made by R. Tait McKenzie in 1928 is situated in the grounds of the Graduate College at Princeton University. Among institutions named in his honor are Westland Mansion, the home of West's friend Grover Cleveland, and the Andrew Fleming West Chair in Classics at Princeton University.

== Works ==
- 1892. Alcuin and the Rise of the Christian schools. New York: Charles Scribner's sons.
- 1902. A Latin Grammar for Schools. New York: D. Appleton and Co.
- 1913. The Graduate College of Princeton. Princeton University Press.
- 1929. A Narrative of the Graduate College of Princeton University : from its proposal in 1896 until its dedication in 1913. Seeley G. Mudd Manuscript Library, Princeton University.
