= Princeton University Graduate School =

Coordinates: 40.34835°N 74.65467°W

- Type: Private
- Established: 1869
- Parent institution: Princeton University
- Dean: Rodney Priestley (eff. 06/01/22)
- Postgraduates: 3,212
- Location: Princeton, New Jersey, United States
- Website: gradschool.princeton.edu

The Graduate School of Princeton University is the main graduate school of Princeton University. Founded in 1869, the school offers postgraduate degrees in 42 disciplines.

== History ==
President James Madison
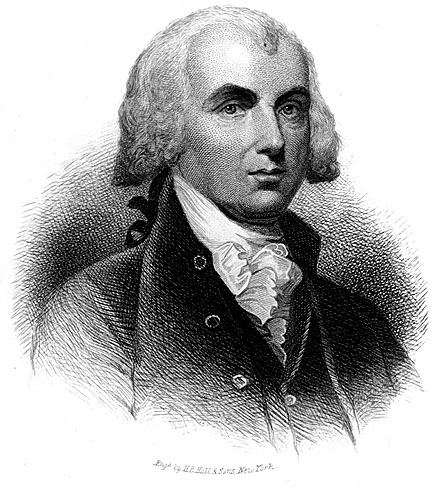
- The "first graduate student" of Princeton University

In 1771, future president James Madison began graduate work at Princeton University under the tutelage of President John Witherspoon, another Founding Father. Often considered Princeton's "first graduate student," Madison studied Hebrew and Political Philosophy, which provided him the foundation for his later career as the delegate to the Congress of the Confederation from Virginia, Secretary of State, and President of the United States. After his studies, students were then permitted to stay at the university after receiving their bachelor's degrees. By 1869, graduate education was standardized through the establishment of general examinations and graduate fellowships. Princeton conferred the first graduate degrees to James F. Williamson and William Libby in 1879. The first dean of the graduate school was Andrew Fleming West. He envisioned a graduate institution that would both produce high quality graduate work from a small number of students. By the 1880s, eight graduate students were enrolled in programs in art and archaeology, astronomy, biology, classics, geology, mathematics, philosophy, and physics. Enrollment gradually increased over the years, particularly under the leadership of physicist Augustus Trowbridge. Applications for graduate enrollment also rose after World War II and after federal funding for graduate fellowships increased substantially, most notably in the sciences.

Women began to enroll in the Graduate School in the 1960s. The first PhD was awarded in 1964. In 1977, Nina G. Garsoian accepted a position as the ninth dean of the graduate school, the first woman to occupy that position.

=== The Graduate College ===
Graduate College
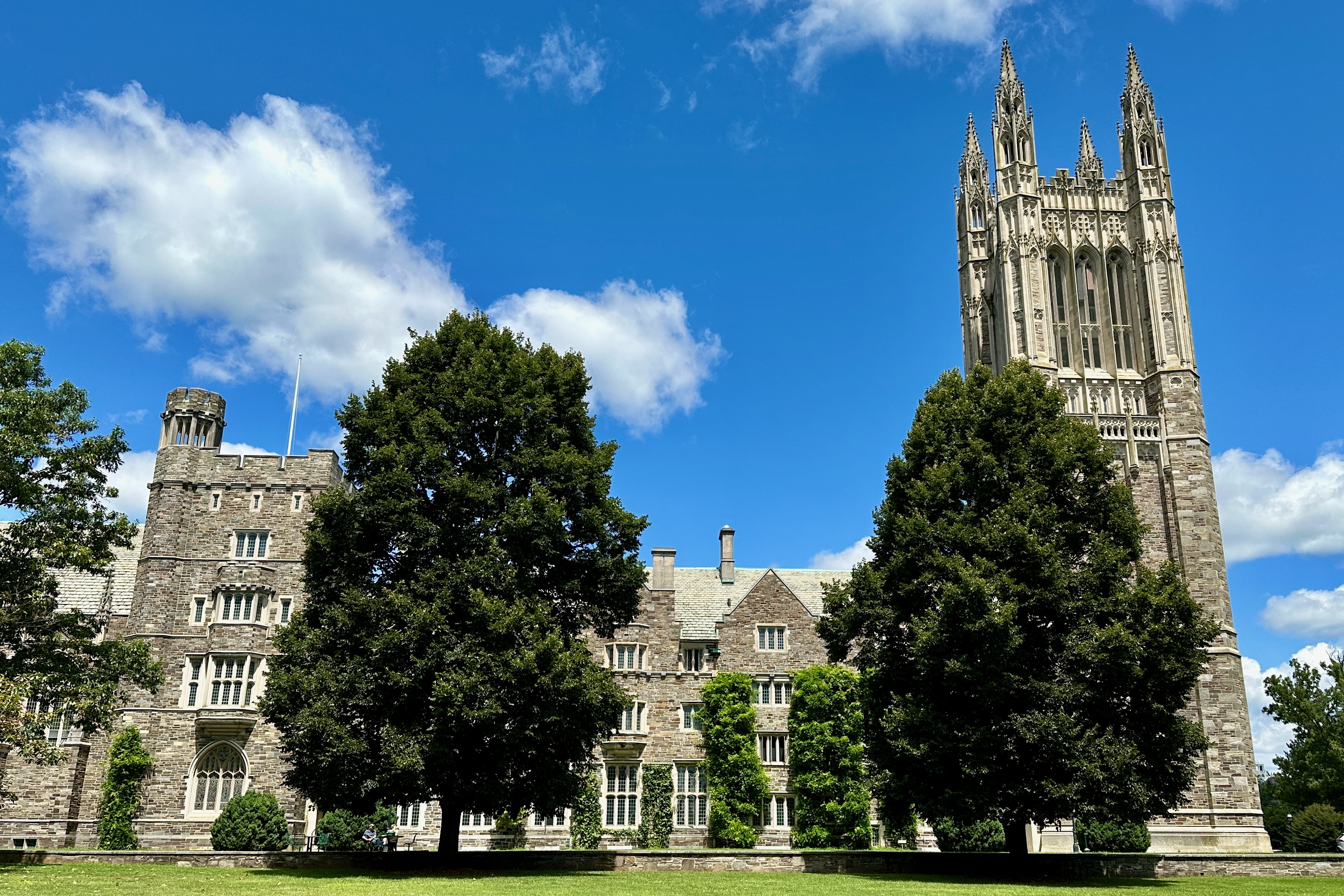
- Old Graduate College and Cleveland Tower

The Graduate College, the residence of the dean of the graduate school and home to many graduate students, was established in 1913. Inspired by the design of Magdalen Tower at Oxford University, the architecture of the Graduate College features brown and gray Princeton stone and green and blue roofs. Built in 1913 and expanded in 1927, the Old Graduate College features traditional Gothic-style architecture in addition to the 173-foot tall Cleveland Tower, a memorial to former university trustee and President of the United States Grover Cleveland. The central quadrangle of the Graduate College, Thomson College, is a memorial to United States Senator John R. Thomson. New Graduate College was built adjacent to the Old Graduate College in 1962, presenting modern-style architecture and comfortable living spaces.

=== High table ===
The tradition of "High Table" traces back to Oxford University and Cambridge University. Fellows of the college were to sit at the end of long refectory tables on raised platforms, dais, above the undergraduates. At Princeton, the tradition began in 1913 in Procter Hall with Professor Howard Crosby Butler. Students, faculty, and guests were invited to sit with the dean of the graduate college at a monthly ceremony. Until the 1970s, dinner at Procter Hall opened with Latin grace spoken by a student, the Master (Professor), or the dean. High Table continues to bring select students and faculty together for discussions and, during formal events, dinner jackets or academic gowns may also be worn.

== Academics ==
Policies and procedures for graduate academics at Princeton are administered by the Office of the Dean of the Graduate School, located at Clio Hall.

Admission to the Graduate School is highly selective with an acceptance rate of approximately 11.7% across all disciplines. The average Graduate Record Examination (GRE) scores for admitted students were 163 out of 170 on the verbal section, 161 out of 170 on the quantitative section and 4.5 out of 6 on the analytical writing section. In the 2018–2019 academic year, 1,373 students were admitted into the graduate school.

=== Degrees and programs ===
The Graduate School offers a number of degree-granting programs in the fields of humanities, social sciences, natural sciences, and engineering. In addition to its own Masters and PhD programs, the school oversees graduate degrees for the Bendheim Center for Finance, the School of Engineering and Applied Science, the School of Architecture, and the Woodrow Wilson School of Public and International Affairs.

Clio Hall
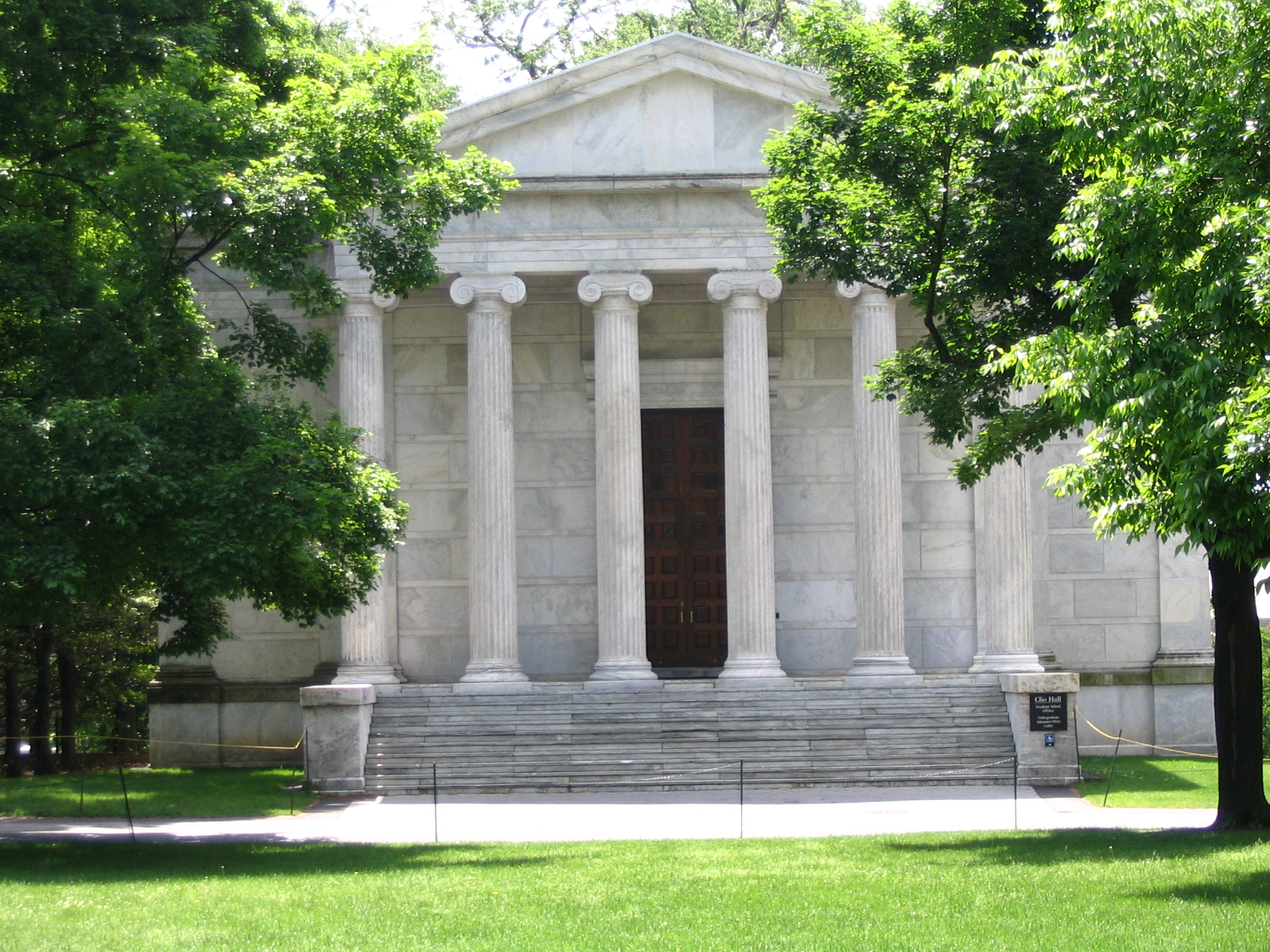
- Office of the Dean of the Graduate School

=== Rankings ===
Graduate programs at Princeton University have been consistently ranked as some of the top in their respective fields. The U.S. News & World Report Best Global Universities Ranking ranks nearly every graduate program within the top ten. Similarly, the National Research Council (NRC)'s Research rankings, which factors in "faculty publications, citation rates, grants, and awards" ranks most programs within the top ten. The Wall Street Journal / Times Higher Education College Rankings 2018 lists Princeton University as a top ten institution, while the QS World University Rankings ranks it within the top fifteen.

| Princeton Graduate Program | U.S. News & World Report Ranking (2018) | National Research Council Research Category Ranking (2010) | QS World University Ranking (2018) |
| Economics | 1 | 2 | 5 |
| History | 1 | 1 | 9 |
| Mathematics | 1 | 1 | 6 |
| Sociology | 1 | 1 | 10 |
| Physics | 3 | 1 | 8 |
| Political Science | 3 | 13 | 3 |
| Biological Sciences | 6 | 2 | 18 |
| Computer Science | 8 | 1 | 8 |
| English | 8 | 1 | 7 |
| Psychology | 8 | 1 | 16 |
| Chemistry | 9 | 11 | 11 |
| Public Affairs | 9 | 1 | N/A |
| Earth Sciences | 10 | 3 | 19 |

=== Facilities ===
Firestone Library
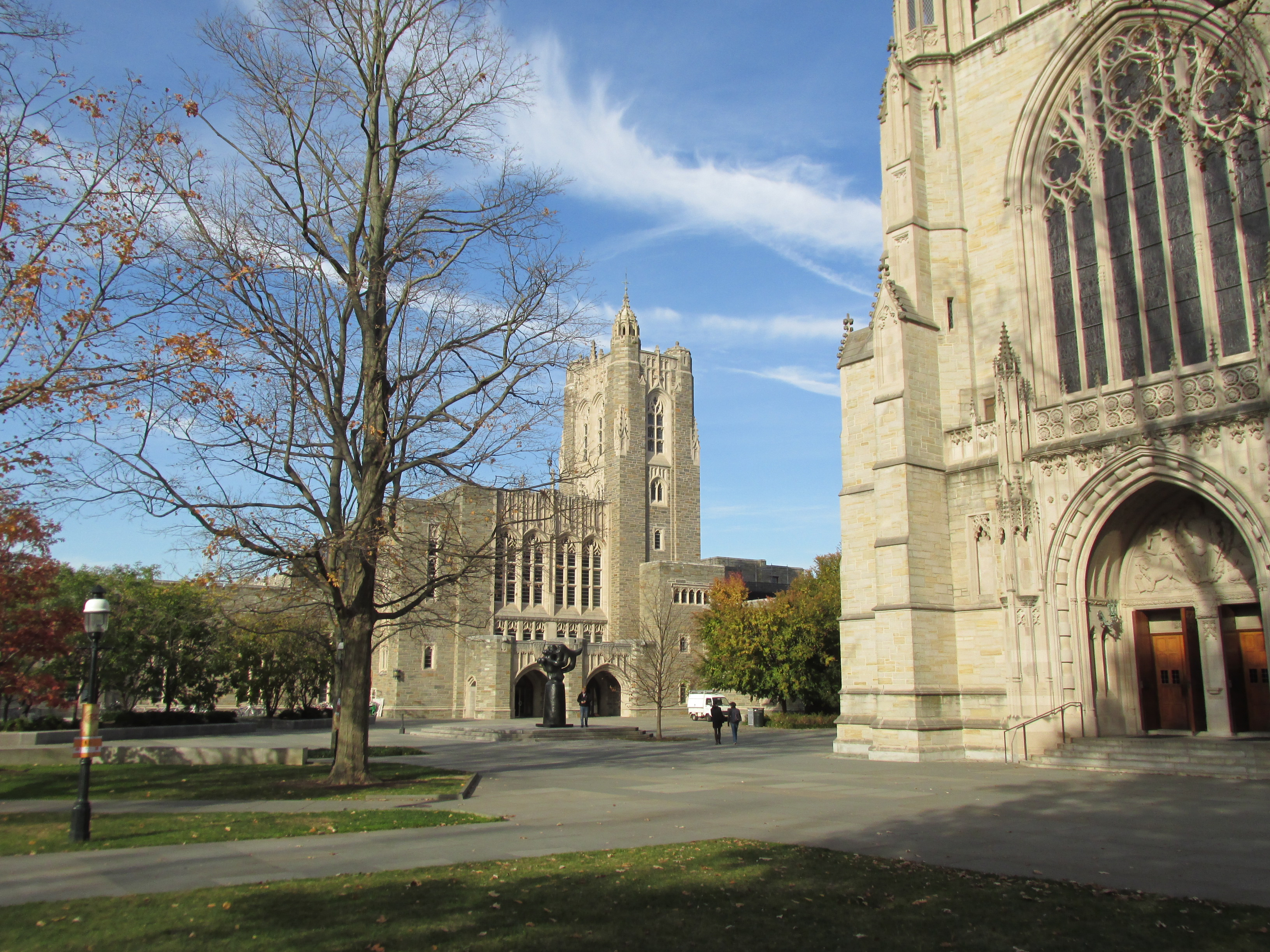
- The main library of Princeton University

Princeton's Graduate School includes a university library system of over seven million volumes, making it one of the largest in the United States. The main one, Firestone Library, opened in 1948, as the first large American university library constructed after World War II. The library is also recognized as having the most books per enrolled student than any other university in the United States. The library system houses Department of Rare Books and Special Collections, which includes the Scheide Library and the Cotsen Children's Library. Additional libraries include the Architecture Library, East Asian Library and Gest Collection, Engineering Library, Lewis Science Library, Marquand Library of Art and Archaeology, Seeley G. Mudd Manuscript Library, Furth Plasma Physics Library, Mendel Music Library, and the Stokes Library.

The McGraw Center for Teaching and Learning provides programs and services for students to develop as professional scholars and teachers. The center provides professional development workshops and training for assistants in instruction (AIs), Princeton's equivalent of teaching assistants (TAs).

=== Partnerships ===
Graduate students are permitted to enroll in partnerships and exchange programs with other universities. The IvyPlus Exchange program allows take courses or conduct dissertation research at any of the Ivy League universities, the University of California, Berkeley, the University of Chicago, Massachusetts Institute of Technology (M.I.T.), or Stanford University. The Graduate School also maintains a number of partnerships and exchange programs with leading universities around the world, including:

- Ecole Normale Superieure (ENS)
- Fondation Nationale des Sciences Politiques (Sciences Po)
- Freie Universitaet Berlin
- Hebrew University of Jerusalem
- Humboldt University of Berlin
- Scuola Normale Superiore (SNS)

== Student life ==
=== Demographics ===
As of 2022, the Graduate School enrolls 3,212 students, of which 408 are master's students and 2,804 are doctoral students. Approximately 58% of the student population is male, 42% female. In addition, 58% are domestic students while 42% are international students.

| Graduate Population by Ethnicity | Percentage |
| White | 52% |
| Asian | 17% |
| Hispanic/Latino | 12% |
| Unknown | 7% |
| Black/African American | 7% |
| Multiracial | 6% |
| American Indian/Alaskan Native | <1% |
| Total | 100% |

=== Activities ===
The Graduate Student Government (GSG) oversees the organization of graduate activities and events. The GSG's mission is "to advocate for the interests of graduate students at Princeton, to provide a forum for free and open discussion of matters affecting graduate students, and to provide financial and organizational support for social events that involve graduate students." There are also a wide array of social, cultural, and academic student organizations for graduate students.
