= Harvard School =

Anti-Augustan interpretations of Virgil's "Aeneid"

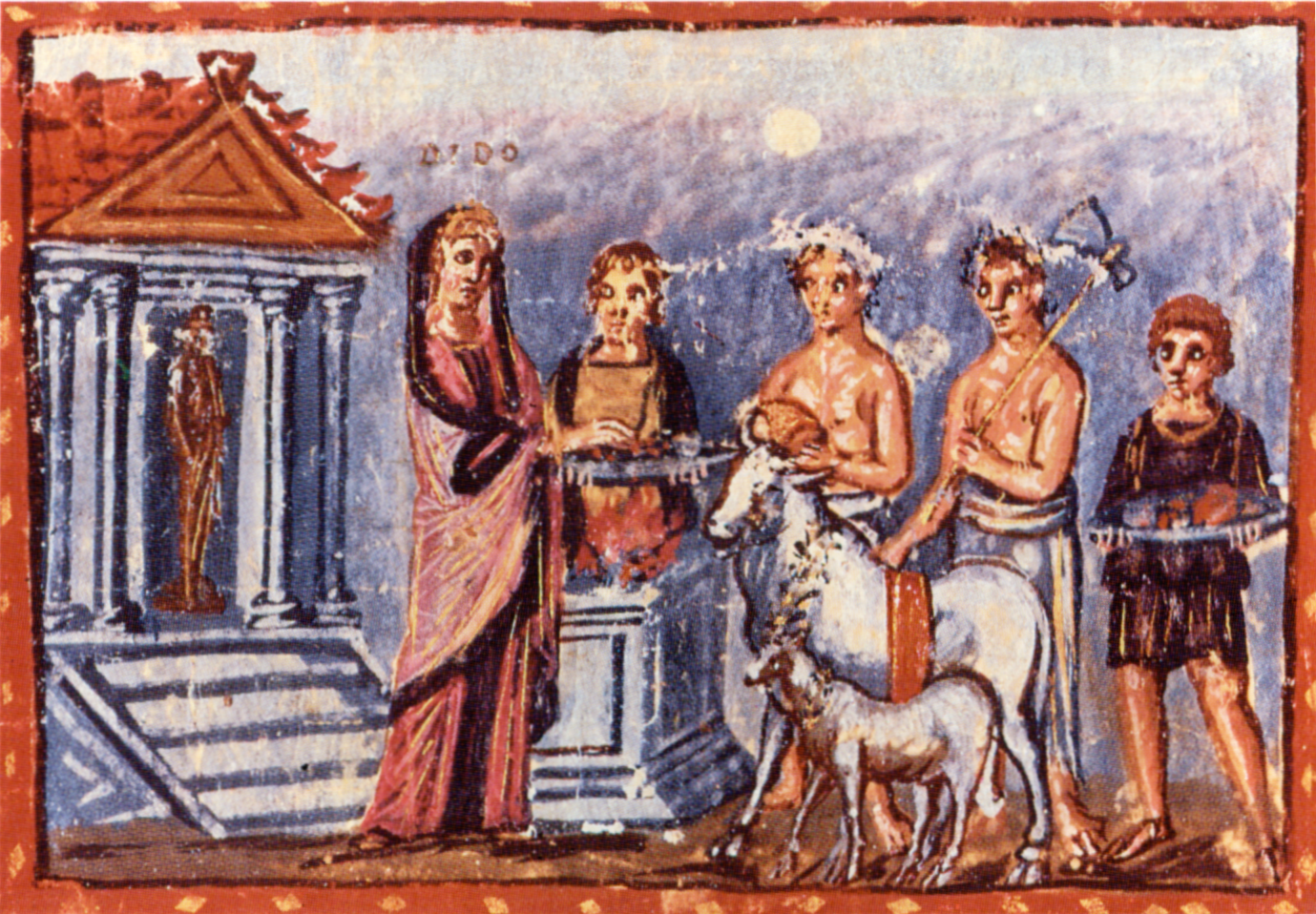
The Carthaginian queen Dido (far left) sacrificing, as depicted in Book 1 of the Aeneid, in the fifth-century Vergilius Vaticanus manuscript. Virgil's portrayal of Dido is a common focus of Harvard School readings of the poem.

The Harvard School (sometimes known as the Harvard–Balliol School) is a school of thought in the study of the Aeneid, an epic poem by the Roman poet Virgil. It challenges the view of the Aeneid as a heroic poem written to glorify the emperor Augustus (r. 27 BCE – 14 CE). Instead, it suggests that the poem places emphasis upon the suffering caused by war and empire and presents its hero, Aeneas, as a flawed character while evoking admiration and sympathy for his antagonists. Such readings often argue that "further voices" or a "private voice" can be detected alongside the propagandistic elements of the poem, problematizing or subverting its surface-level messages.

Although the Aeneid was overwhelmingly read as a work of Augustan propaganda into the mid-twentieth century, interpretations of the poem as containing anti-Augustan elements, and of Aeneas as an imperfect hero, can be traced to antiquity. The works of Christian apologists and ancient commentators, such as Servius, preserve evidence of minority readings which criticized Aeneas and suggested that Virgil was opposed to Augustus's regime. The Augustan reading remained dominant through the early modern period, though a number of readings saw Aeneas and his actions as flawed or attempted to reinterpret the poem as anti-autocratic. Aspects of nineteenth-century Virgilian criticism foreshadowed the Harvard School in focusing on the Aeneid's melancholy and sympathy for human suffering, while some early textual critics attempted to remove as spurious parts of the poem which they judged incompatible with Virgil's assumed Augustan beliefs.

The Harvard School proper developed from the New Criticism movement in the middle of the twentieth century. It was named retrospectively by W. R. Johnson in 1976, and different scholars and perspectives have been variously associated with it. Harvard School approaches to the Aeneid tend to highlight the Aeneid's sympathetic portrayal of the victims of Aeneas's and Augustus's success (such as Dido and Turnus) and the poem's melancholic view of its costs, and to interpret Aeneas as a flawed, hesitant or unsatisfactory hero. The earliest work of the Harvard School is often considered to be R. A. Brooks's 1953 article "Discolor aura: Reflections on the Golden Bough"; other works commonly associated with the movement include Adam Parry's 1963 article "The Two Voices of Virgil's Aeneid", Wendell Clausen's 1964 article "An Interpretation of the Aeneid", and Michael Putnam's 1965 book The Poetry of the "Aeneid". Other scholars cited as members of the school include Jasper Griffin, Oliver Lyne, Charles Segal and Richard F. Thomas.

The Harvard School's "pessimistic" interpretation of the Aeneid dominated Anglophone scholarship in the later twentieth century. Its methodological approach was adopted even by scholars who disagreed with its broad conclusions, and had become largely the norm by the early twenty-first century. Critics of the Harvard School characterized it as anachronistic, as oversimplifying the Aeneid or taking isolated details out of context, and as limiting the scope of inquiry into the poem. By the end of the twentieth century, the question of whether the Aeneid should be considered Augustan or anti-Augustan was generally considered outdated, and several scholars considered the ambivalence of the poem's "optimistic" and "pessimistic" aspects to be itself part of the Aeneid's artistry.

== Precursors ==
=== In antiquity ===
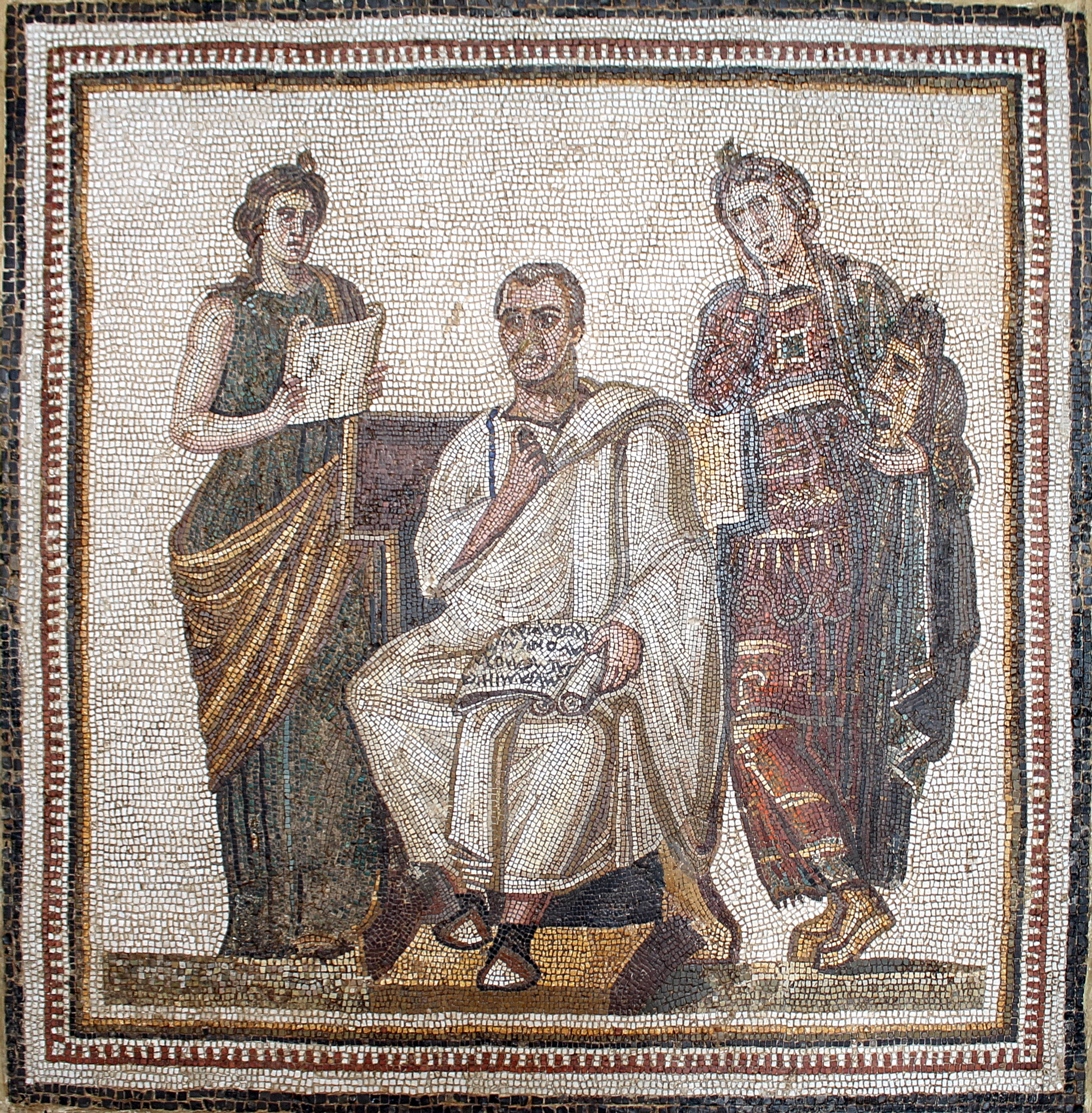
A third-century mosaic portrait of Virgil, flanked by Muses, from Hadrumetum in North Africa. The scroll on his lap is open to Aeneid 1.8.

The Aeneid is an epic poem, written in Latin by the Roman poet Virgil, between 29 BCE and his death in 19 BCE. It tells the story of the Trojan hero Aeneas and his journey from Troy to Italy, where he becomes the ancestor of the Roman people, and foretells the coming of the emperor Augustus (r. 27 BCE – 14 CE) as the bringer of a new Golden Age. (Note: Augustus was known as "Octavian" until 27 BCE.) Aeneas was considered to be the ancestor of the gens Iulia, the aristocratic family to which Augustus belonged, and the Aeneid establishes Aeneas as prefiguring and paralleling him. Within a generation of Virgil's death, the Aeneid was considered a literary classic and a poem befitting Augustus's ideology – the poet Ovid referred to it as the emperor's poem in a work of 9 CE. (Note: Thomas 2001, p. xiv; the Ovidian reference is to Tristia 2.533.) This view remained dominant throughout antiquity. According to the traditional account of Virgil's life, he asked for his manuscripts of the Aeneid to be burned upon his death rather than published: Richard Thomas suggests that this may have been motivated by a desire to avoid having the poem used by Augustus as propaganda.

Thomas suggests that readings of the Aeneid as opposed to the Augustan project may have existed from the very earliest stages of the poem's reception. A Roman biography of Virgil by Suetonius (fl. c. 69–122 CE) preserves a criticism raised by "Marcus Vipsanius", (Note: Alternatively read as Vipranius, a figure otherwise unknown, by Harry Jocelyn.) considered by Thomas to be Augustus's lieutenant Marcus Vipsanius Agrippa (who died in 12 BCE), that Virgil's language was "affected ... and of hidden nature". (Note: Thomas 2001, p. 12, citing Suetonius, Life of Virgil 44: cacozeliae ... atque ideo latentis. For Agrippa's death, see Detweiler 1970, p. 289.)

In the fourth or fifth century CE, the commentary of Servius on Virgil's Eclogues recorded that "some readers" interpreted a line about finding another lover as a veiled indication of Virgil's wish to find a replacement for Augustus as emperor. (Note: Thomas 2001, pp. 94–95: the line cited is Eclogues 2.73.) Thomas argues that Servius's commentary on the Aeneid, although it consistently asserts the poem's compatibility with Augustan ideology, provides evidence for competing readings that must have existed alongside his. Servius frequently argues against readers who suggest that Aeneas fails to live up to the standards of a hero: these include the mid–first century CE commentary of Lucius Annaeus Cornutus, which criticizes Aeneas for using a dove, a bird sacred to his mother Venus, as a target in an archery competition. He attempts to neutralize ambivalent readings of the episode of the Golden Bough in Aeneid 6, which is described as cunctantem ('hesitating') as Aeneas attempts to remove it from a tree: this follows the Sibyl's pronouncement that it would "come freely" to one favored by the gods, and therefore may imply that Aeneas is not truly favored. Thomas argues that Servius's attempts to suppress this interpretation indicate that it was already current by the time of his commentary.

The Christian author Lactantius criticizes Aeneas in his apologetic work The Divine Institutes, written in the first decade of the fourth century. (Note: Kallendorf 2017, p. 85. On the date of Lactantius's work, see Barnes 1981, p. 13; p. 291, n. 96) In the Aeneid and its Augustan reception, Aeneas's defining virtue is his pietas (his dutifulness towards his father, country and gods); Lactantius accuses Aeneas of acting "detestably" in killing those at his mercy and in carrying out acts of human sacrifice, and asks rhetorically whether any reader will think "that this man had any virtue in him, who burned with fury ... and who, forgetting the shade of his father ... could not bridle his wrath?". (Note: Lactantius, Divine Institutes 5.10, citing Aeneid 10.516–519, 10.523, 11.106, 11.111, and 12.946, itself cited in Kallendorf 2017, p. 85. The shade of Anchises urges Aeneas to "spare the conquered" in Aeneid 6.) Around the turn of the fifth century, the Christian theologian Augustine gave a sermon in which he imagined Virgil avowing that the prophecy of Roman greatness spoken by his Jupiter – that the Romans would be given imperium sine fine, or "empire without end" – was false, since it was impossible for any earthly power to be eternal. (Note: Thomas 2001, p. 119, citing Augustine, Sermones 105.7.10, itself citing Aeneid 1.278–279.)

=== To the nineteenth century ===
Pietro Candido Decembrio, an Italian humanist of the fifteenth century, wrote an unfinished continuation of the Aeneid (which ends abruptly with the death of Turnus, Aeneas's antagonist) from the perspective of Turnus. In Decembrio's version, Turnus is described as magnanimus (an epithet literally meaning 'great-souled' and applied more frequently to Aeneas) and his people, the Rutulians, are presented positively: Sonja Eckmann and Craig Kallendorf suggest that this might have become a fully pessimistic reinterpretation of the poem had Decembrio finished it. (Note: Kallendorf 2017, p. 86, citing Eckmann 2002. On magnanimus, see Gervais 2022, pp. 25–26.) The fifteenth-century humanist Francesco Filelfo criticized Aeneas's actions at the end of the poem for giving in to rage rather than showing pietas; his contemporary Giovanni Pontano praised Turnus as an exemplar of bravery and self-control. In a commentary on the poem published by the Spanish Jesuit scholar Juan Luis de la Cerda in 1612, both Aeneas and Turnus are interpreted as noble and worthy of emulation: Kallendorf writes that there is "a sense of tragedy and excessive loss in this interpretation that would satisfy anyone in the Harvard School". (Note: Kallendorf 2017, p. 87. On de la Cerda, see Laird 2002, p. 171.)

A minority of early modern readings of the Aeneid dissented from the view that it promoted Augustus and his ideology. Kallendorf argues that William Shakespeare's play The Tempest, written around 1610–1611, reinterprets the Aeneid in ways which draw out from the poem "further voices" critical of imperialism. He further argues that Shakespeare's interpretation of the Aeneid, contrary to the supposed Augustan message, emphasizes the power of passion and anger to overpower reason and civilization. Similarly, he suggests that John Milton read the Aeneid as an anti-monarchical poem whose greatest sympathies were with Turnus. In Kallendorf's reading, Milton's 1667 poem Paradise Lost uses the Aeneid to critique monarchical power and to draw links between the sins of Adam and those of Aeneas.

John Dryden published a translation of the Aeneid in 1697 which became the primary English version of the poem; he suggested in his dedication of the translation that Virgil had been a republican and a reluctant supporter of Augustus. In eighteenth-century England, it became common to present Virgil as sacrificing his "poetical conscience" to praise Augustus, and to suggest that the portrayal of Augustus in the poem as a wise peacemaker was deliberately inaccurate but an attempt to present him as he should have been, rather than according to his true nature. (Note: The "poetical conscience" term was used by Antony Shaftsbury in 1755, and is cited at Weinbrot 1978, p. 124.) In 1766, Robert Andrews made a translation of the Aeneid which, according to the twentieth-century Latinist T. W. Harrison, "make[s] Virgil a kind of fifth columnist", though Harrison considered this to be an unsuccessful attempt to reconcile the poem to Andrews's own anti-autocratic politics. (Note: Harrison 1967, pp. 6–7, cited in Thomas 2001, p. 124.)

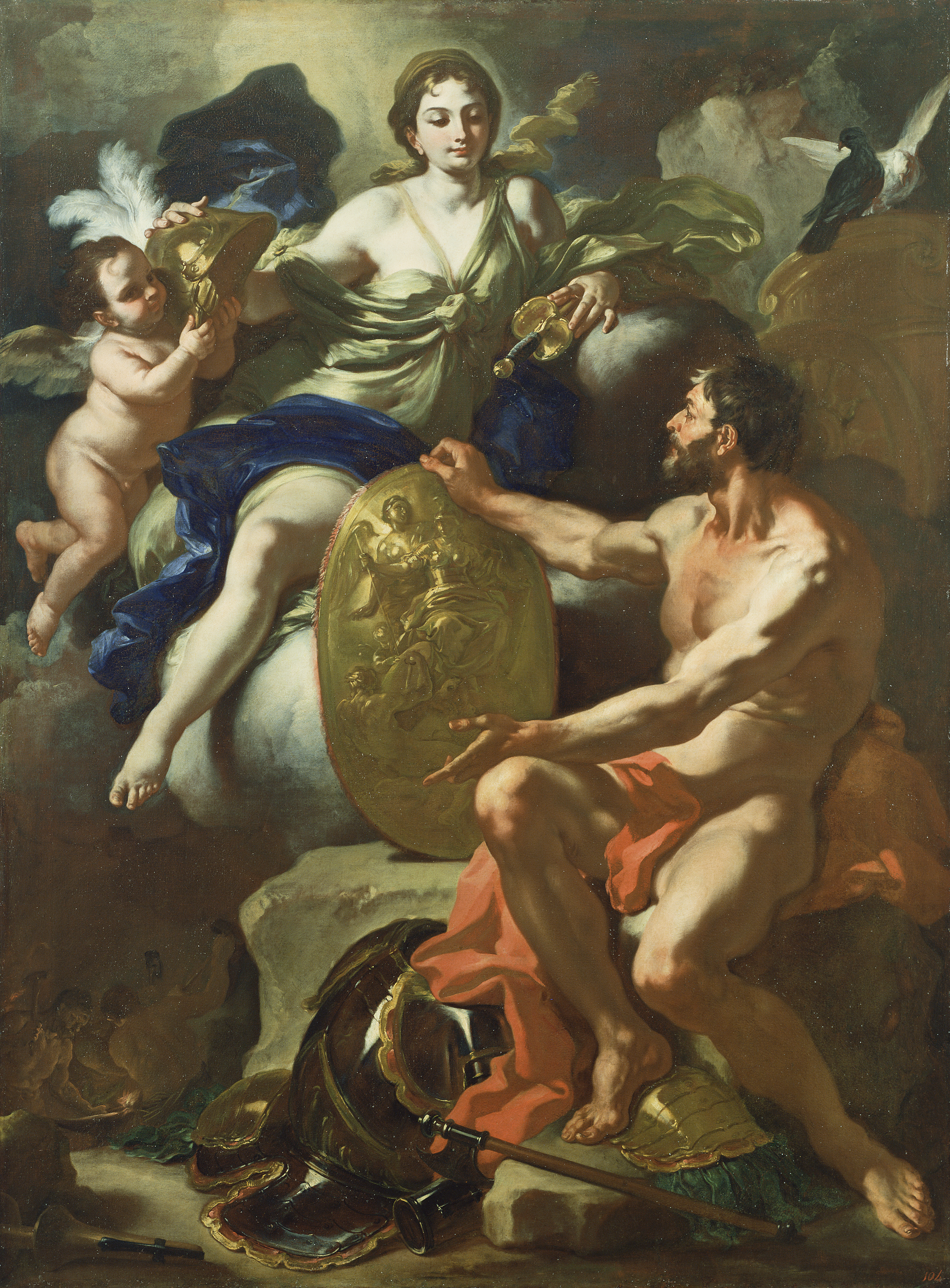
Vulcan, the god of the forge, hands the Shield of Aeneas to Aeneas's mother Venus in a scene from Aeneid 8, painted by Francesco Solimena in 1704.

Nineteenth-century readers overwhelmingly viewed Virgil as an Augustan propagandist, though early textual critics sometimes judged as spurious parts of the poem which they considered dissonant with this interpretation. The 1843 edition of Petrus Hofman Peerlkamp removed the episode of the Shield of Aeneas from Book 8, since Peerlkamp judged it to be at odds with the Augustan messages he considered central to Virgil's work, and therefore either to be spurious or an instance of "critical incompetence" from the poet. Stephen Harrison suggests that aspects of nineteenth-century Virgilian criticism foreshadowed the Harvard School, and may have influenced it. He cites Matthew Arnold's 1857 lecture "On the Modern Element in Literature", noting that Clausen uses Arnold's term "melancholic" to describe Virgil's poetry; the lectures delivered by John Keble between 1831 and 1841, in which Keble emphasized Virgil's "sorrow and sympathy for wretched and weak mortals"; and Alfred, Lord Tennyson's 1882 poem "To Virgil". Tennyson characterizes Virgil as a poet unsure in his faith – "Thou majestic in thy sadness / at the doubtful doom of human kind"– and, in Richard Jenkyns's words, both the poet "of imperial power, [and] a voice of grace and grief".

=== In the twentieth century ===
Before 1945, most scholarly treatments of the Aeneid considered it a celebration of Roman imperialism and Augustus's rule, and it was frequently invoked in turn to legitimise European imperialism and hegemony. Early works which opposed this interpretation and argued for "bivocalism" – the idea that Virgil's perspective on Rome and Augustus was ambivalent or ambiguous – included E. Adelaide Hahn's 1925 "Vergil and the 'Under-Dog'", which drew attention to the poem's invocation of pity for its antagonists, particularly Dido and Turnus. (Note: Horsfall 1995, p. 192, n. 8. Hahn's article is Hahn 1925.) Maurice Bowra's 1933 "Aeneas and the Stoic Ideal" similarly emphasized the audience's pity for Aeneas's enemies, and judged that "Aeneas never appeals to us with the same thrill as Dido or Turnus ... by making us feel some qualms about Aeneas, [Virgil] gave us his own innermost feelings about this heroic type". (Note: Horsfall 1995, p. 192, n. 8; Bowra's quotation is at Bowra 1933, pp. 8, 21.) Nicholas Horsfall calls Bowra a forerunner of the Harvard School, and suggests that this was a consequence of his experience of the First World War, in which he served as an artilleryman.

Alongside Hahn and Bowra, Nicholas Horsfall names Frank Hewitt Cowles's 1934 article "Vergil's Hatred of War" and W. F. Jackson-Knight's 1944 book Roman Vergil as bivocalist interpretations. (Note: Horsfall 1995, p. 192, n. 8, citing Cowles 1934 and Jackson-Knight 1944.) Jackson Knight's study categorized the Aeneid as "suggestive" poetry, as distinct from "intellectual", in that it was based more on symbolism and effects created through the collocation of words and sounds than on the strict meanings of its language. Following the psychological theories of Carl Jung, he interpreted Virgil's poetry as fundamentally the product of his unconscious mind. (Note: Reviewing Jackson Knight's work, the critic R. G. Austin called it "wild and wilful", writing that "none of us can know for certain what Virgil had in his mind; it is a pretty game to make inferences from what we have in our own minds, but that is not valid evidence".) Cowles's article argues that "Virgil's sympathy for the victims [of war] is unmistakeable", and that Virgil would have supported Augustus only insofar as Augustus's rule meant the coming of world peace.

In 1935, the exiled Italian scholar Francesco Sforza published "The Problem of Virgil", an article described by Thomas as "by any standard ... the most extreme and polemical view of Virgil's hostility to Rome and Augustus that has ever been produced". (Note: Thomas 2001, p. 272, citing Sforza 1935.) Sforza argues that "beyond the face meaning of the Aeneid [exists] a second and hostile meaning"; that Virgil opposed autocracy, disbelieved in the Roman state religion, and viewed both Aeneas and Augustus with hatred. W. R. Johnson, in 1976, called the article a near-caricature of the views later expounded by the Harvard School. (Note: Thomas 2001, p. 273, citing Johnson 1976, p. 156, n. 10.) The anti-fascist intellectual Carlo Levi, in his 1945 memoir Christ Stopped at Eboli, articulated a similar view of the poem, which saw Aeneas and the Trojans as bloodthirsty invaders and their Italian enemies as "peasant bands, risen in self-defence ... doomed to defeat". (Note: Quoted in Thomas 2001, pp. 275–276.)

== History ==
=== Origins ===
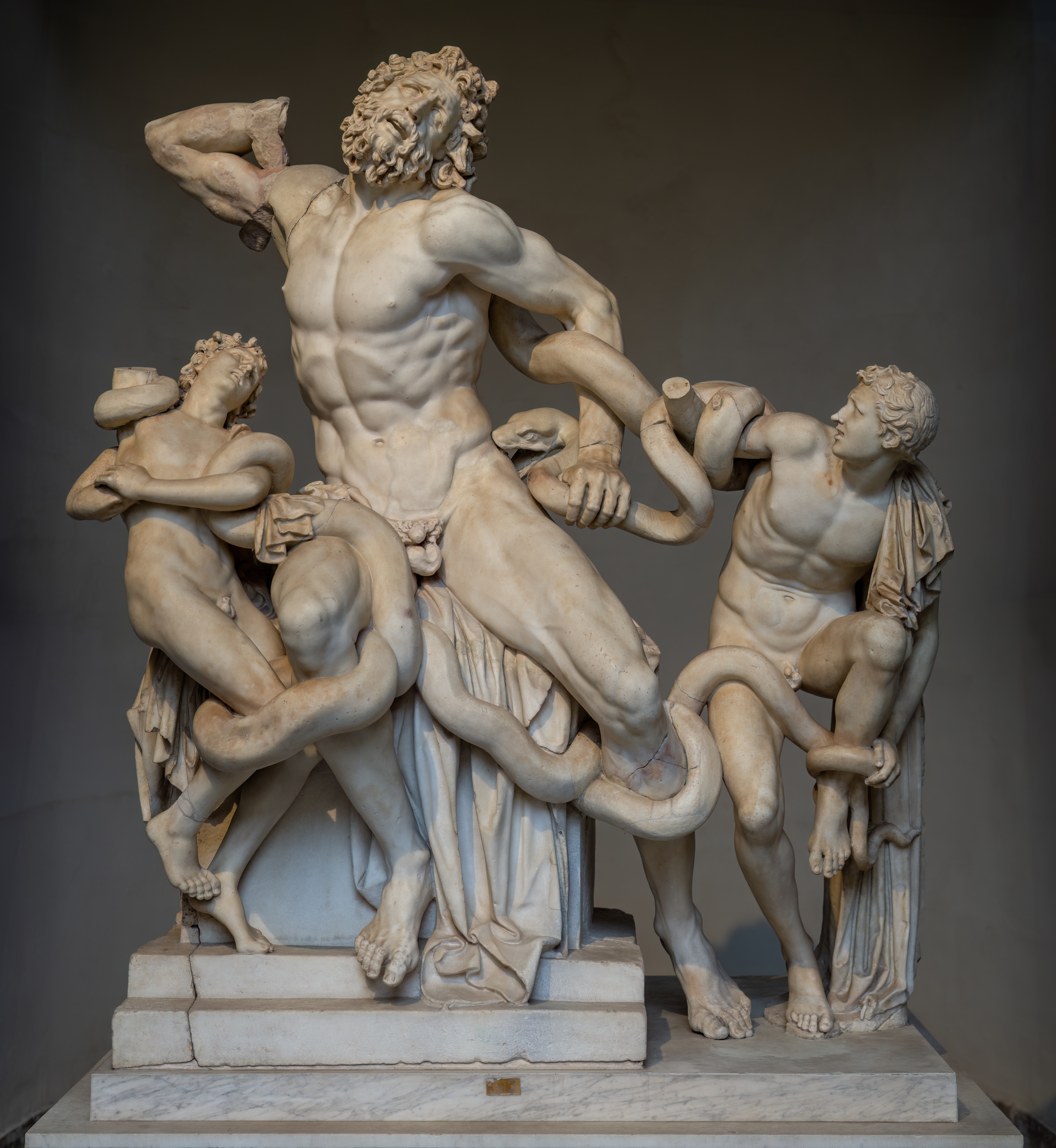
The death of Laocoön and his sons, depicted in a first-century BCE Roman statue group. Virgil depicts this scene in Aeneid 2: Maurice Bowra, foreshadowing the Harvard School, drew attention to Virgil's focus on the perspective of the defeated Trojans in this book.

Wendell Clausen, who worked with Adam Parry (a leading proponent of the Harvard School) at Amherst College during the mid-1950s, wrote that the character of the Harvard School was formed during this period, and reflected what Clausen called "the mild-minded pessimism" of the era. Johnson later connected it to the anxieties produced by the 1945 atomic bombings of Japan, the beginnings of the Cold War (particularly the Korean War), and the rise of McCarthyism. James Zetzel suggests that the early works of the Harvard School were influenced by Reuben A. Brower, a professor successively at Amherst and at Harvard: Brower was a personal friend of the Harvard School scholars Clausen and Michael Putnam, and knew Parry and R. A. Brooks, another prominent figure within the movement.

The Harvard School is sometimes considered to have been inspired by opposition to American involvement in the Vietnam War. Horsfall notes that it originated earlier, and that Brooks served as an assistant secretary of the army in the early stages of the war. However, he suggests that opposition to the war contributed to the popularity of Harvard School readings in American universities. Stephen Harrison similarly wrote in 1990 that the Harvard School was difficult to separate from the broader 1960s Zeitgeist of anxiety around American imperialism, though noted in 2017 that its origins had predated the Vietnam War and that Clausen and Putnam had stated that their interpretation of the Aeneid was unrelated to their views on contemporary foreign policy.

The Harvard School developed from the New Criticism movement in literary theory, a movement which developed in the first half of the twentieth century and sought to focus criticism on the text itself, rather than the author or their intent. (Note: Farrell 2017, pp. 67–68; Johnson 2017, p. 84; Zetzel 2017, pp. 126–127. On New Criticism, see Makaryk 1993, p. 120.) J. P. Elder, who worked with Putnam and Brooks at Harvard University and became an early exponent of the application of New Critical methods to classical literature, was an influence upon the Harvard School. Harrison sees it as an extension of the critical approach developed by Viktor Pöschl in his 1950 book Die Dichtkunst Vergils ('Virgil's Poetic Art'), in that Pöschl focused on imagery and symbolism, though Pöschl considered the poem to be Augustan in ideology. Karl Galinsky, in 2017, called the Harvard School "an overdue reaction" against the academic consensus that the Aeneid should be read as a work of Augustan propaganda; he identified key works in that tradition as Ronald Syme's 1939 book The Roman Revolution and Robert Graves's 1962 article "The Virgil Cult". (Note: Galinsky 2017, p. 73. Graves's article is Graves 1962.)

=== Scholarly work associated with the Harvard School ===
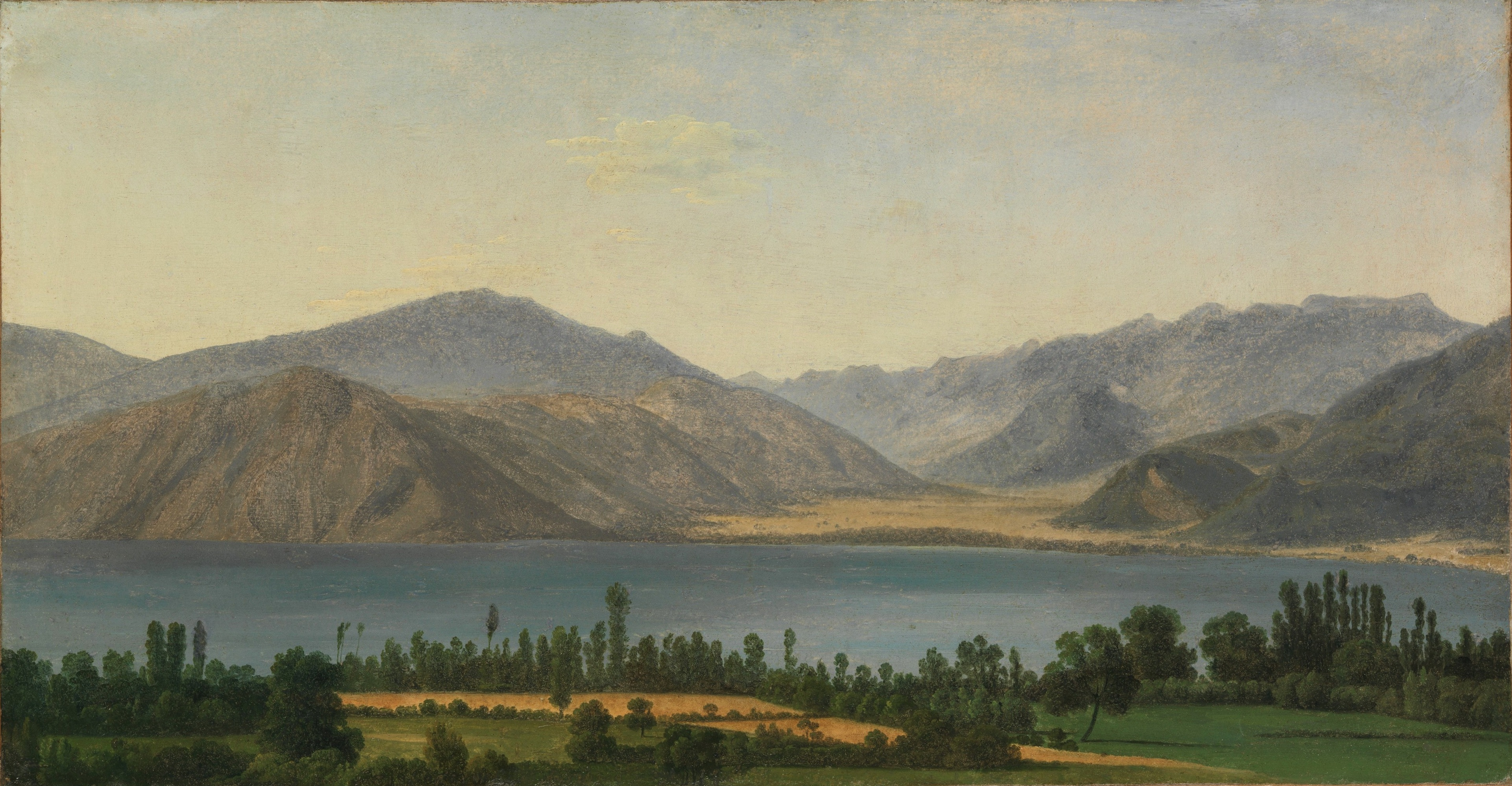
An eighteenth-century painting of Lake Fucino in Italy by Jean-Joseph-Xavier Bidauld. Parry's "Two Voices" article opens with a discussion of a passage of the Aeneid in which the lake mourns for the fallen hero Umbro.

The Harvard School was never a formally constituted group, and scholars considered to belong to it have adopted a range of interpretations of the poem, sometimes changing their own views over time. The term "Harvard School" was first used by W. R. Johnson in his 1976 work Darkness Visible: A Study of Vergil's "Aeneid". Johnson identified the members of the Harvard School as Parry, Clausen, Brooks, and Putnam, all of whom had at some point worked at Harvard University. In 2013, James O'Hara suggested the addition of Johnson, Charles Segal, David Ross, Richard F. Thomas and Christine Perkell, as well as the British classicists Anthony Boyle, Jasper Griffin, and Oliver Lyne, the latter two of whom were fellows of Balliol College, Oxford. Following Don Fowler, who called it "Anglo-American two-voices Harvard and Balliol pessimism", it is sometimes referred to as the "Harvard–Balliol School".

Clausen and Stephen Harrison list the foundational works of the Harvard School as Brooks's 1953 article "Discolor aura: Reflections on the Golden Bough", often considered the first work of the movement; Parry's 1963 article "The Two Voices of Virgil's Aeneid"; and Putnam's 1965 book The Poetry of the "Aeneid". Harrison adds Clausen's 1964 article "An Interpretation of the Aeneid", while James Zetzel considers Kenneth Reckford's 1971 article "Latent Tragedy in Aeneid VII, 1–285" within the school's tradition. Steele Commanger collected many of the early articles of the Harvard School in his 1966 edited volume Virgil: A Collection of Critical Essays. (Note: Thomas 2001, p. 224, n. 3; the volume is Commanger (ed.) 1966.) In 1981, Putnam held a conference on Virgil at SUNY Buffalo, later described by Hans-Peter Stahl as "Harvard School affiliated": the event's proceedings were published under Putnam's editorship in the journal Arethusa. (Note: Stahl 2017, p. 110. The journal is Putnam (ed.) 1981.)

James O'Hara called the "Harvard School" label "convenient but potentially misleading". Joseph Farrell questioned how far Harvard University and the Harvard School should be connected, pointing out that Brooks was working at the Smithsonian Museum by the early 1970s, and that other Harvard classicists, such as J. P. Elder and Zeph Stewart, did not share its pessimistic interpretation. Horsfall similarly calls the name "Harvard School" inaccurate, preferring "the two-voices school" or "bivocalism". Zetzel suggests that the idea of the Harvard School as a coherent ideological grouping was invented by Johnson as an oversimplification, intended to allow him to position himself as intermediate between it and a similarly simplified characterization of the Augustan interpretation of the poem. Jenkyns judges that works in the Harvard School tradition grew more pessimistic over time, and questions whether the early members of the school would be considered to share the methods and attitudes that became characteristic of its later works.

== Interpretation of the Aeneid ==
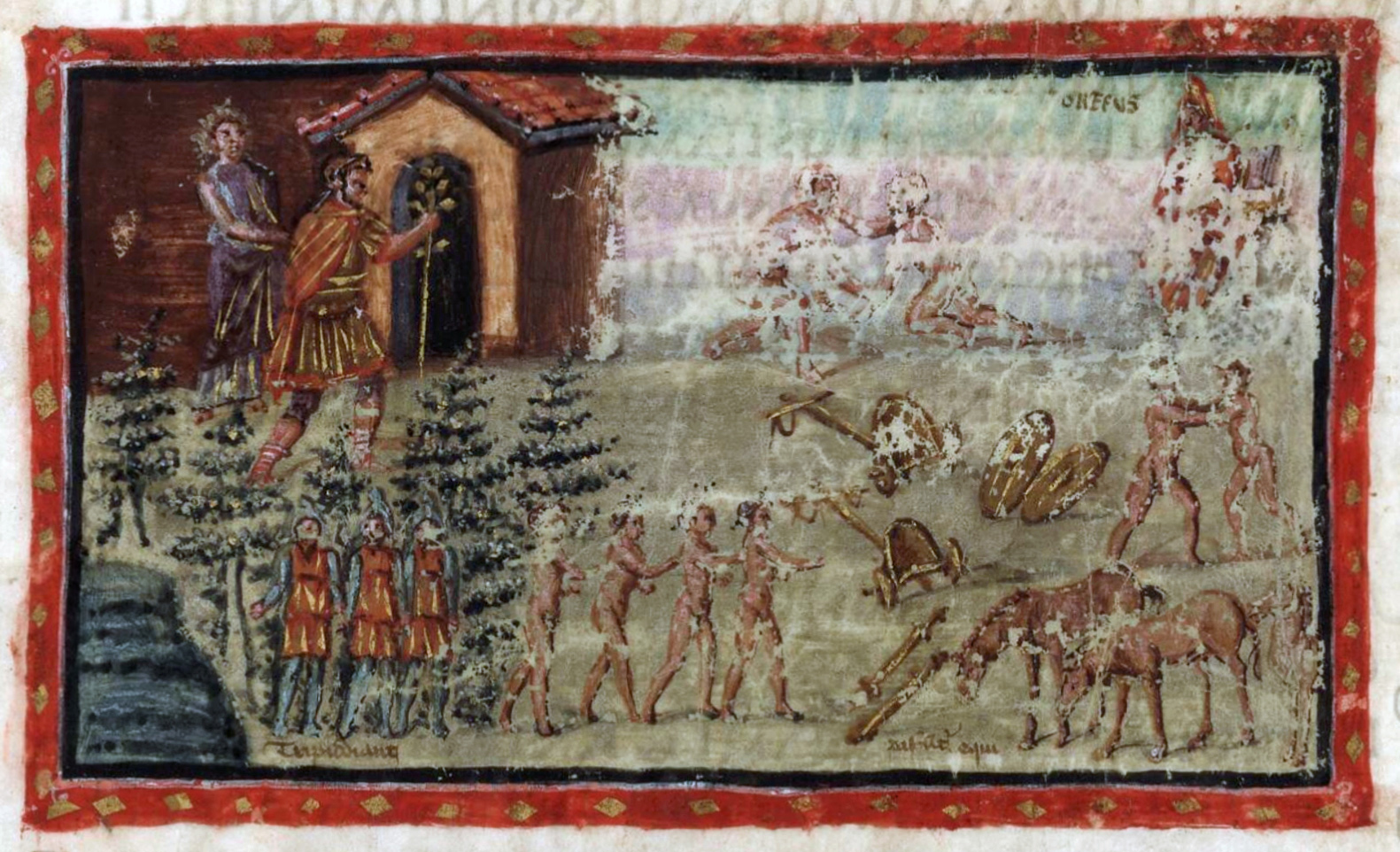
Aeneas, holding the Golden Bough, approaches the gates of Elysium in an illustration from the fourth-century CE Vergilius Vaticanus manuscript of the Aeneid.

The Harvard School questioned the then-orthodox view of Virgil's Aeneid as propaganda for the emperor Augustus. Characteristic features of the Harvard School include the belief that the surface-level propagandistic messages of the poem are undercut by more subtle notes of pessimism, a focus on the Aeneid's portrayal of the victims and costs of Aeneas's and Augustus's success, and an interpretation of Aeneas as a flawed, hesitant or unsatisfactory hero. As such, Harvard School interpretations are often referred to as "pessimistic", in contrast to those which are "optimistic" about Augustus and Rome's future. Clausen described the Aeneid as the story of "a long Pyrrhic victory of the human spirit".

In "Discolor aura", Brooks argued that previous commentators had neglected the symbolic and suggestive aspects of the Golden Bough, an episode in the sixth book of the Aeneid. He considers the episode to highlight Aeneas's ignorance of the full implications of his destiny, the distorted and ambiguous nature of Virgil's language, and Aeneas's inability to achieve a final state of success. More generally, he characterizes the Aeneid as "a work in limbo" defined by "splendid despair". Putnam's book charted repetitions of words and structures across four books of the Aeneid, (Note: Specifically, Books 2, 5, 8 and 12.) arguing that Virgil uses these to create associations between apparently unrelated characters and episodes, such as between the flight of Cacus from Hercules described in Book 8 and that of Turnus from Aeneas in Book 12, both described with the phrase ocior Euro ("swifter than the East wind"). (Note: Austin 1967, pp. 280–281, citing Aeneid 8.223 and 12.733.)

Parry's "Two Voices" argues that the poem contains what he calls "a private voice of regret" alongside its "public voice of triumph". He considers that Virgil uses this private voice to emphasize the costs and flaws of Augustus's rule and of Roman imperialism. Lyne's 1987 Further Voices in Virgil's "Aeneid" developed Parry's two-voices argument into a paradigm of "further voices", which question and sometimes undercut the ostensibly propagandistic message of the poem: Lyne argues that these operate through Virgil's inclusion of provocative material, his juxtaposition of material within the poem, and his use of imagery, ambiguity and intertextual allusion.

=== Dido ===
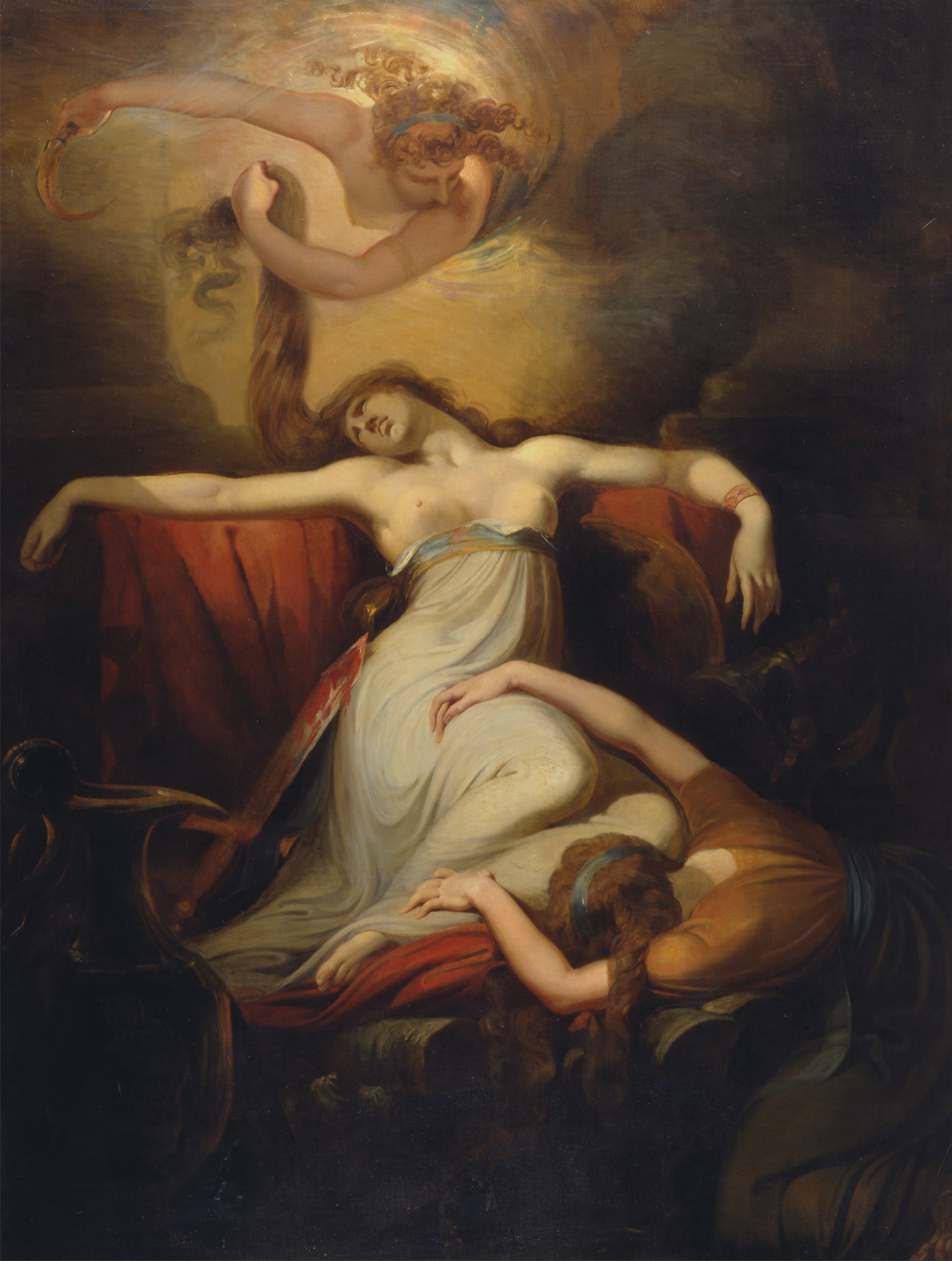
The death of Dido, as depicted by Henry Fuseli in 1781

In Books 1–4 of the Aeneid, Aeneas meets the Carthaginian queen Dido. Influenced by the goddesses Juno and Venus, Dido falls in love with Aeneas; the two shelter from a storm in a cave, and divine portents ensue which Dido interprets as marking her marriage to him. At the end of Book 4, the messenger god Mercury conveys Jupiter's command that Aeneas must leave Carthage to seek Italy: he does so, attempting to conceal his departure from Dido. When she discovers this, she kills herself with Aeneas's sword, promising eternal enmity between her descendants and his.

Steven Farron writes that Virgil's own sympathies, and those of the audience, are with Dido rather than Aeneas, and that he portrays Aeneas's mission as "brutal and destructive". He calls the episode "an attack on Aeneas's mission and Rome". Wendell Clausen and Michael Putnam argue that Virgil portrays Dido as a tragic heroine, associating her via literary allusions to mythological women unjustly abandoned by male heroes such as Ariadne and Medea, and therefore secures the audience's pity for her while placing blame upon Aeneas. Richard Gaskin similarly blames Aeneas for misleading Dido into thinking that he considered their relationship a marriage. Oliver Lyne argues that Virgil presents Dido as a victim of Aeneas and the gods, while presenting Aeneas in an unsympathetic light as the destroyer of both her and her city. He traces a "further voice" in the correspondences between Dido and the Latin queen Amata, later driven to madness by the Dira (agent of divine punishment) Allecto, which invites the reader to draw parallels between Allecto and Venus – Augustus's claimed ancestor – that cast Venus "in a somewhat disturbing light".

In 2008, Alessandro Schiesaro wrote that critics had "overwhelmingly packaged [Dido] as the archetypal 'other voice'" to the poem's teleological, Augustan plot. Charles Segal similarly interprets her as "a small, expendable part" of "the fated plan of history" as formulated and enacted by the gods. Both Gaskin and Philip Hardie suggest that allusions in the Aeneid to the Argonautica of the Greek poet Apollonius of Rhodes imply a sibling-like relationship between Aeneas and Dido, and so give their affair the impression of incest. Hardie suggests that this invites readers to compare the founding of Rome to the story of Oedipus, also marked by an incestuous marriage and the wife's suicide, and undercuts the Augustan attempt to distinguish Roman identity and ideology from that of eastern Greek monarchies, such as Ptolemaic Egypt, in which incestuous royal marriages were common. Giusti argues further that a "further voices" reading would draw an anti-imperialistic message from the associations made by Virgil between the death of Dido and the destruction of Carthage at the end of the historical Punic Wars between Carthage and Rome.

=== Aeneas's journey to the Underworld ===
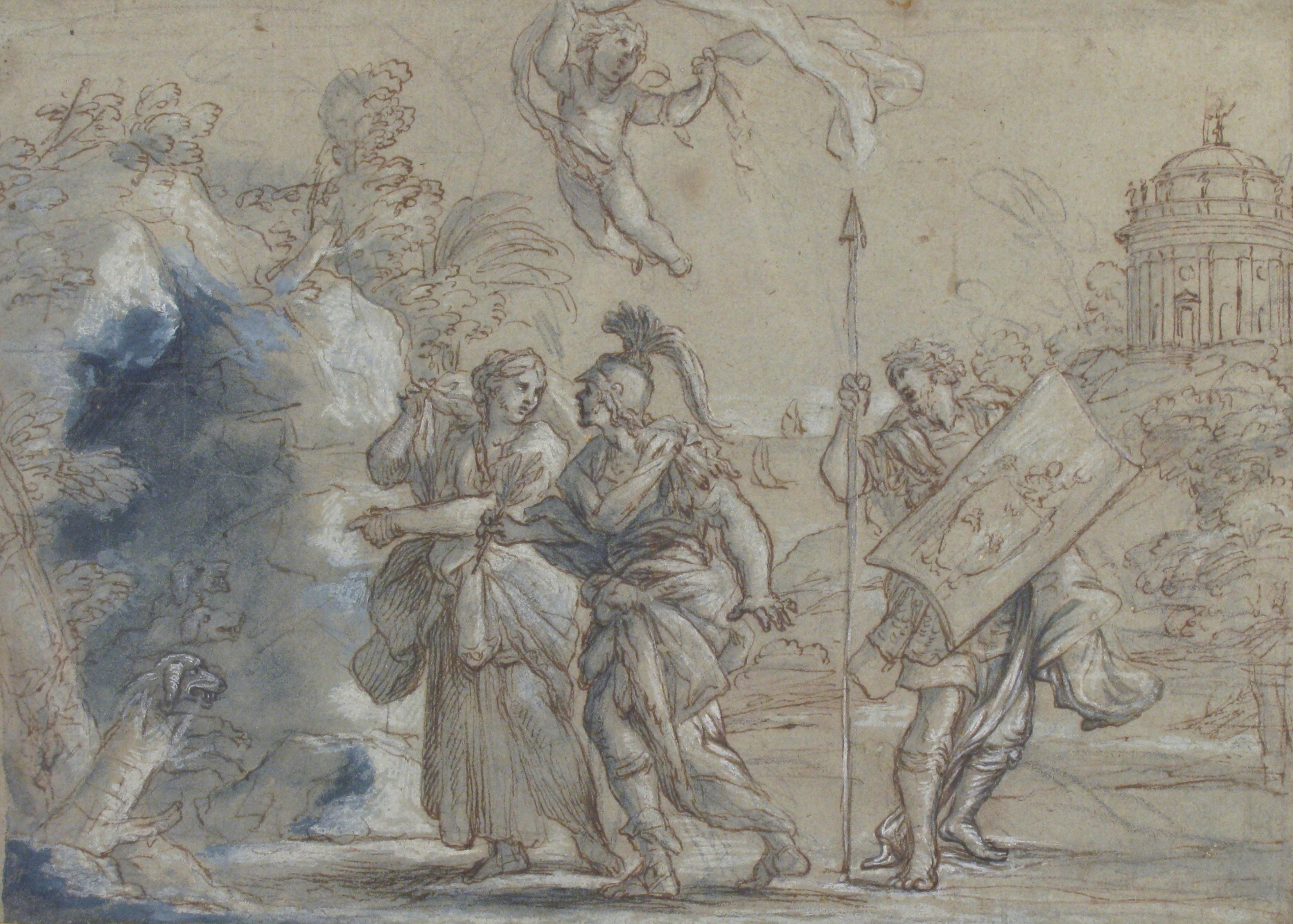
Aeneas's entry to the Underworld, with the Sibyl, depicted by Giovanni Francesco Romanelli in 1610

In Book 6 of the Aeneid, Aeneas travels to the Underworld, where he receives prophecies from his father Anchises about the future of his Roman descendants. He is first instructed to collect the Golden Bough as an offering to Proserpina, the queen of the Underworld. Segal discusses the discrepancy between the Sibyl's instructions to Aeneas – that the bough will "come easily of its own accord", if Aeneas's journey is ordained by fate – and what occurs when he reaches the bough; the bough momentarily resists him. He suggests that the episode's incidental nature to the plot, as well as the close proximity between the instructions and the bough's resistance, suggests that Virgil intended the discrepancy and that it is significant to the poem. He sees Aeneas's taking of the bough as "a symbolical anticipation of the rude loss of innocence" that awaits the land of Italy, and more generally indicative of "a divided attitude to the destiny of Rome and the cost of empire".

The centerpiece of Book 6 is the "Parade of Heroes", in which Anchises shows Aeneas a vision of Rome's future heroes and triumphs. The parade itself, though mostly triumphalist, contains features which can be taken as ambiguous or pessimistic. Denis Feeney mentions the positive portrayal of Lucius Junius Brutus, the namesake of the assassin of Augustus's adoptive father Julius Caesar, as well as his list of Latin towns to be founded by Aeneas's descendants. Most of these, such as Nomentum, Gabii and Fidenae, were deserted or insignificant in Virgil's time, perhaps inclining the audience to regret their decline in favor of Rome, or to contemplate a future in which Rome, also destined to be founded by Aeneas's descendants, were to be similarly eclipsed. Nicholas Horsfall suggests that Anchises's supposedly celebratory reference to the Roman king Tullus Hostilius's military triumphs would most naturally be interpreted by Harvard School readers as a moment of regret, since Tullus breaks the state of peace created by his predecessor Numa. (Note: Horsfall 2013, p. 555, note on Aeneid 6.814–815.) Anchises mentions several other kings and heroes, often with connections to unsavory figures from Republican history, and establishes a consistent pattern by which bad sons follow good fathers, perhaps casting doubt on Augustus's ability to realize the prophesied glorious future.

At the end of his time in the Underworld, Anchises instructs Aeneas to leave through a gate of ivory, which he immediately before explained was the route by which false dreams reach the mortal world. Nicholas Reed in 1973 described a "pessimistic" reading by which this was taken to indicate that Aeneas's vision of Rome's glorious future was itself a false dream, and so that Virgil did not believe in the Augustan ideology ostensibly encapsulated in it.

=== The death of Turnus ===
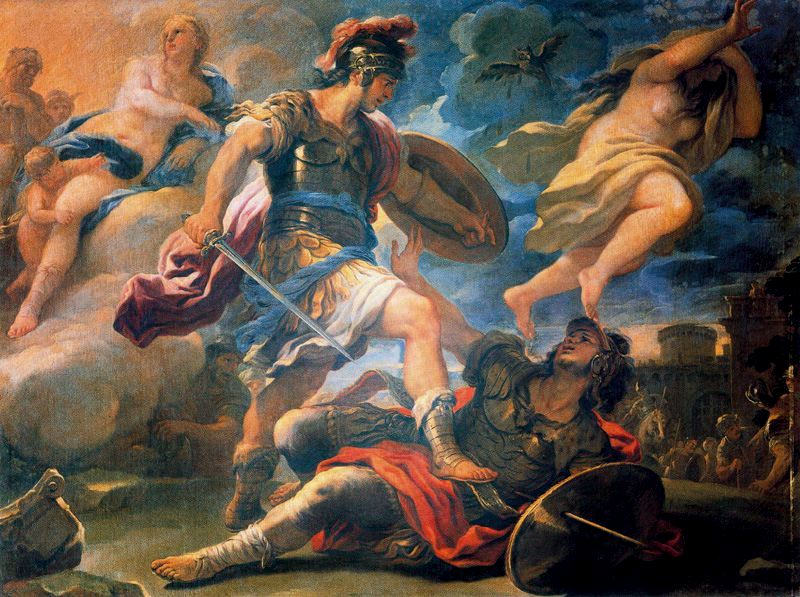
Aeneas's killing of Turnus in Aeneid 12, as painted by Luca Giordano in 1688

At the end of the Aeneid, Aeneas faces his enemy Turnus in single combat: he wounds him in the thigh with his spear, leaving Turnus defenseless. Turnus asks him to return him to his father, either alive or as a corpse; Aeneas kills Turnus in fury. In doing so, he refuses to show mercy – in Latin, clementia – to Turnus. During Augustus's reign as emperor, clementia became a fundamental part of his persona, and one which he cultivated through public actions and his posthumously published autobiography, the Res Gestae.

Horsfall calls Turnus's death "a difficult, complex, allusive, challenging end" to the poem, with implications for the poem's view of many of its central themes. Richard Tarrant calls Aeneas's refusal to show clementia to Turnus "ambivalent", and suggests that it showed Aeneas acting more as Augustus did in practice than according to how he wished to be viewed in propaganda. Johnson writes that there is "general dissatisfaction or uneasiness" with the poem's ending, and that attempts to rationalize it by treating Turnus's death as a deserved punishment prove inadequate.

Aeneas's killing of Turnus is frequently considered the most controversial issue in Virgilian scholarship, and Barbara Weiden Boyd has cited it as the most controversial scene in Latin literature. Oliver Lyne argues that Aeneas's killing of Turnus represents a failure of the "Stoic and imperial" mission given to him by Anchises to "impose custom upon peace / [and] spare the conquered". Putnam considers that Turnus's death gives the greatest victory of the Aeneid to Juno, the personification of anger and wrath, rather than to Aeneas or to Augustan Rome. He also argues that Virgil attracts the audience's sympathy to Turnus, partly through intertextual and intratextual references connecting him to Dido and the Homeric hero Hector.

Commenting on Turnus's role in the Aeneid as a whole, Parry sees him as a sympathetic victim and a symbol of the costs of Rome's destiny: "the embodiment of a simple valor and love of honor which cannot survive the complex forces of civilization". He concludes that "the Aeneid enforces the fine paradox that all the wonders of the most powerful institution the world has ever known are not necessarily of greater importance than the emptiness of human suffering". Clausen writes that the poem's ending has "no sense of triumph", and that it shows the Aeneid to be neither a work of propaganda or a "sentimental" poem which resolves its conflicts at the end.

== Reception ==
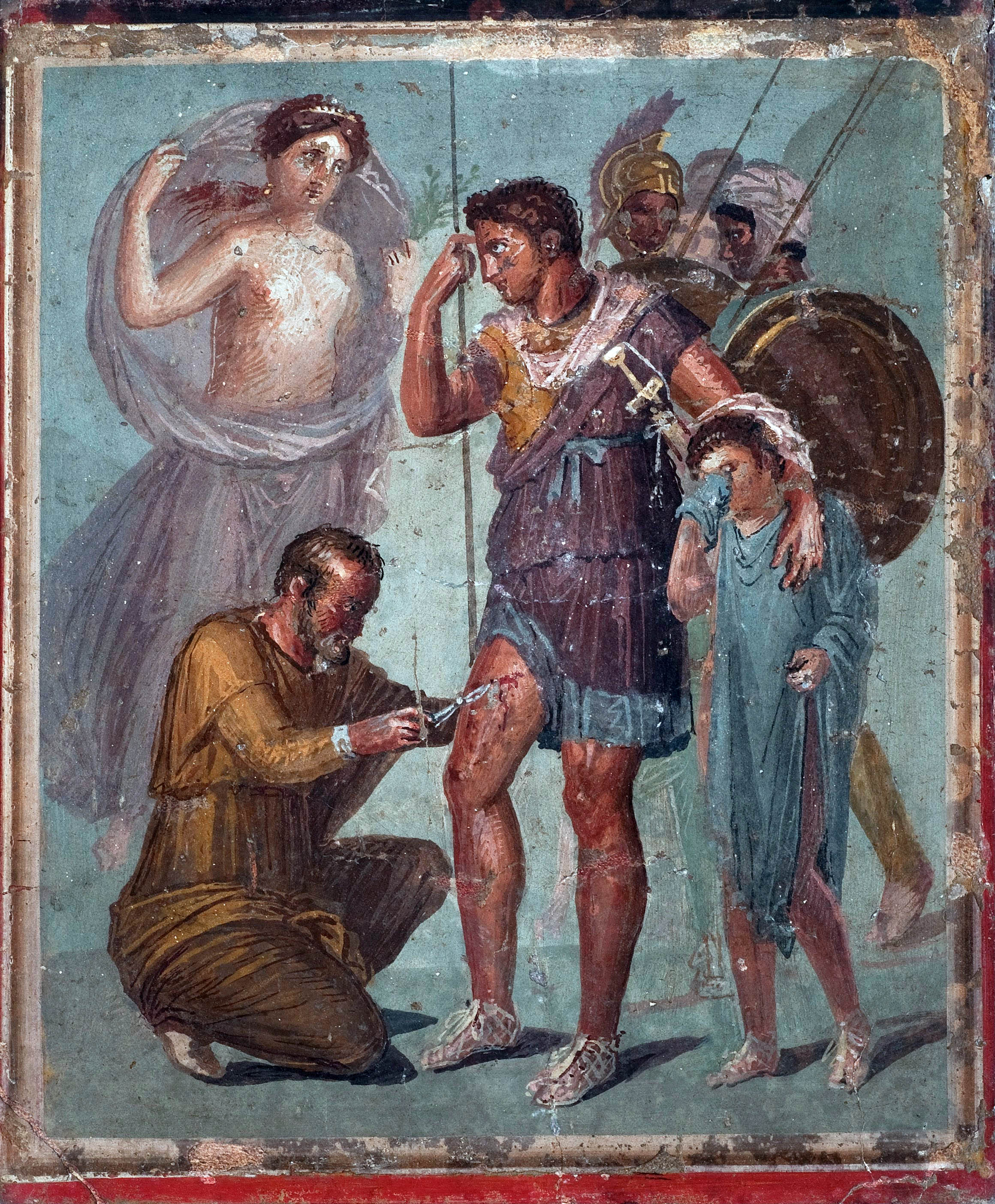
The healer Iapyx removing an arrowhead from Aeneas's leg, in a Roman painting from Pompeii, c. 79 CE. The episode is narrated towards the end of the Aeneid, in Book 12.

The broadly "pessimistic" view associated with the Harvard School quickly became the norm in Anglophone scholarship, particularly in the United States, though "optimistic" Augustan readings continued to be prominent in continental Europe into the twenty-first century. "The Two Voices of Virgil's Aeneid" has frequently been cited as a major influence on Virgilian scholarship. In 1989, Richard F. Moorton called it "one of the most influential essays on the Aeneid ever written". In 2000, Stephanie Quinn called it one of the most influential of the previous thirty-five years. In 2018, Susanna Braund wrote that "if there is one single scholarly intervention that shifted our view of the Aeneid, it was surely Adam Parry's essay". In 2017, Ward W. Briggs referred to the dominant paradigm of Virgilian studies in the generations after 1963 as "a kind of Parryitis".

The Harvard School was controversial among Virgilian scholars, and widely criticized into the twenty-first century. It is often characterized as anachronistic or as an effort by scholars to rehabilitate Virgil to their own modern, liberal political beliefs. (Note: Nandini Pandey argues that this is no less true of those who take the poem to be a work of imperialistic or autocratic propaganda.) Galinsky criticized the Harvard School for oversimplifying the Aeneid, such as by treating different manifestations of furor (which can encapsulate extreme emotions from murderous rage to erotic lust) as interchangeable, and by reducing the debates around the poem to whether it should be considered pro- or anti-Augustan. Hans-Peter Stahl criticized it for taking individual passages out of context, and allowing a close reading of small details to obscure larger points concerning the work as a whole. Anton Powell compared it to "a miner with myopia", and attributed to it an "unexamined, wishful and self-indulgent" theoretical basis.

Clark wrote that the Harvard School "force[d] all Vergilian scholars to take a position on how they think the Aeneid should be read", specifically by problematizing the claim that the poem's use of allusion and intertext uniformly endorsed Augustus and his rule. Giusti characterizes Virgilian scholarship between the 1950s and 1990s as "monopolised" by the question of the poet's relationship to Augustan ideology. Harrison notes that the Harvard School was influential upon mid-century British critics, such as Kenneth Quinn and R. D. Williams; Williams incorporated Parry's treatment of the "private voice" and "public voice" of the poem, though he did not share the Harvard School's conclusion that the poem was overall pessimistic in nature. Thomas considers that the overall approach adopted in "The Two Voices", though controversial upon its publication, had become orthodox and universal by 2014.

From the end of the twentieth century, scholars generally viewed the central question raised by the Harvard School – that of whether the Aeneid should be considered an Augustan or anti-Augustan poem – as outdated or inappropriate. Shadi Bartsch, for example, argued in 1998 that neither an "optimistic" Augustan reading or a "pessimistic" Harvard School reading can encompass the range of meanings encoded in the many ekphrases (depictions of artwork) in the poem. Duncan Kennedy's 1992 essay "'Augustan' and 'Anti-Augustan': Reflections on Terms of Reference" was influential in moving the debate from such static readings, arguing that efforts to do so overemphasize authorial intent and ignore the ways in which a text can possess multiple meanings, as determined by its audiences. (Note: Giusti 2016, citing Kennedy 1992.) Modern treatments of the poem tend to avoid attempting to identify stable ideological messages within it, instead focusing on the different interpretations available to readers and the aspects of the text which promote or suppress them. Many critics consider that the ambivalence of the poem's "optimistic" and "pessimistic" aspects is itself part of the Aeneid's artistry.

== Bibliography ==
- Austin, R. G. (1945). "Review: Roman Virgil by W. F. Jackson Knight". The Classical Review. 59 (1): 16–20. doi:10.1017/S0009840X00087539.
- Austin, R. G. (1967). "Review: The Poetry of the Aeneid: Four Studies in Imaginative Unity and Design by Michael C. J. Putnam". The Journal of Roman Studies. 57 (1–2): 280–281. doi:10.2307/299394. JSTOR 299394.
- Barnes, Timothy D. (1981). Constantine and Eusebius. Cambridge, Massachusetts: Harvard University Press. ISBN 0-674-16531-4.
- Bartsch, Shadi (1998). "Ars and the Man: The Politics of Art in Virgil's Aeneid". Classical Philology. 93 (4): 322–342. doi:10.1086/449404. JSTOR 270394.
- Bowra, C. Maurice (1933). "Aeneas and the Stoic Ideal". Greece and Rome. 3 (7): 8–21. doi:10.1017/S0017383500002175. JSTOR 641464.
- Boyle, Anthony J. (2018). The Chaonian Dove: Studies in the Eclogues, Georgics, and Aeneid of Virgil. Leiden: Brill. ISBN 978-90-04-32829-7.
- Braund, Susanna (2005). Latin Literature. New York: Taylor and Francis. ISBN 1-134-64677-1.
- Braund, Susanna (2018). "Virgil After Vietnam". In Braund, Susanna; Torlone, Zara Martirosova (eds.). Virgil and His Translators. Oxford University Press. pp. 107–123. ISBN 978-0-19-881081-0.
- Briggs, Ward W. (2017). "What the Harvard School Has Taught Me". The Classical World. 111 (1): 53–55. doi:10.1353/clw.2017.0065. JSTOR 48553367.
- Brooks, Robert A. (1953). "Discolor aura: Reflections on the Golden Bough". The American Journal of Philology. 74 (3): 260–280. doi:10.2307/292310. JSTOR 292310.
- Clark, Raymond J. (2017). "Optimism and the Pessimism of the Harvard School: Contrasting Perspectives". The Classical World. 111 (1): 57–61. doi:10.1353/clw.2017.0067. JSTOR 48553369.
- Clausen, Wendell (1964). "An Interpretation of the Aeneid". Harvard Studies in Classical Philology. 68: 139–147. doi:10.2307/310802. JSTOR 310802.
- Clausen, Wendell (1987). Virgil's Aeneid and the Tradition of Hellenistic Poetry. Berkeley: University of California Press. ISBN 0-520-05791-0.
- Clausen, Wendell (1995). "Appendix". A Companion to the Study of Virgil. By Horsfall, Nicholas. Mnemosyne Supplements. Vol. 151. Leiden: Brill. pp. 313–314. ISBN 90-04-09559-4. ISSN 0169-8958.
- Commanger, Steele, ed. (1966). Virgil: A Collection of Critical Essays. Englewood Cliffs: Prentice-Hall. ISBN 978-0-13-942193-8. OCLC 1178657682 – via Internet Archive.
- Cowles, Frank Hewitt (1934). "Vergil's Hatred of War". The Classical Journal. 29 (5): 357–374. JSTOR 3290159.
- Detweiler, Robert (1970). "Historical Perspectives on the Death of Agrippa Postumus". The Classical Journal. 65 (7): 289–295. JSTOR 3295699.
- Dowling, Melissa Barden (2006). Clemency and Cruelty in the Roman World. Ann Arbor: University of Michigan Press. ISBN 0-472-11515-4.
- Eckmann, Sonja (2002). "Das Aeneis-Supplement der Pier Candido Decembrio: Die pessimistische 'Stimme' der Aeneas?" [The Aeneid-Supplement of Pier Candido Decembrio: The Pessimistic "Voice" of Aeneas?]. Neulateinisches Jahrbuch (in German). 4: 55–88.
- Edgeworth, Robert J. (2005). Stem, Rex (ed.). "The Silence of Vergil and the End of the Aeneid". Vergilius. 51: 3–11. JSTOR 41587304.
- Farrell, Joseph (1990). "Which Aeneid in Whose Nineties?" (PDF). Vergilius. 36: 74–81.
- Farrell, Joseph (2017). "The Harvard School(s) and Latin Poetry, 1977–91: A Bildungserinnerung". The Classical World. 111: 62–73. doi:10.1353/clw.2017.0069. JSTOR 48553371.
- Farron, Steven (1980). "The Aeneas–Dido Episode as an Attack on Aeneas' Mission and Rome". Greece and Rome. 27 (1): 34–47. doi:10.1017/S0017383500027327. JSTOR 642775.
- Feeney, Denis (1986). "History and Revelation in Vergil's Underworld". Proceedings of the Cambridge Philological Society. New Series. 32 (212): 1–24. doi:10.1017/S0068673500004806. JSTOR 44696915.
- Fowler, Don (1989). "Roman Literature". Greece & Rome. 36 (2): 234–241. doi:10.1017/S001738350002982X. JSTOR 643258.
- Fratantuono, Lee (2007). Madness Unchained: A Reading of Virgil's Aeneid. Lanham: Lexington Books. ISBN 978-0-7391-1237-3.
- Galinsky, Karl (2017). "Reflections of an Infidel". The Classical World. 111 (1): 73–76. doi:10.1353/clw.2017.0070. JSTOR 48553372.
- Gaskin, Richard (2021). "On Being Pessimistic About the End of the Aeneid". Harvard Studies in Classical Philology. 111: 315–368. JSTOR 48650304.
- Gaskin, Richard (2025). Dido's Tragedy: A Literary Commentary on Virgil's Fourth Aeneid. Liverpool University Press. ISBN 978-1-83624-512-4.
- Gervais, Kyle (2022). "Virgil's Hero, Turnus". Renaissance and Reformation/Renaissance et Réforme. 45 (3): 17–49. doi:10.33137/rr.v45i3.40407. JSTOR 27215264.
- Gildenhard, Ingo; Gotter, Ulrich; Havener, Wolfgang; Hodgson, Louise (2019). "Introduction: Attending to the Past: On the Politics of Time in Ancient Rome". In Gildenhard, Ingo; Gotter, Ulrich; Havener, Wolfgang; Hodgson, Louise (eds.). Augustus and the Destruction of History: The Politics of the Past in Early Imperial Rome. Cambridge Philological Society. pp. 1–36. ISBN 978-0-9568381-8-6.
- Giusti, Elena (2016). "Did Somebody Say Augustan Totalitarianism? Duncan Kennedy's 'Reflections', Hannah Arendt's Origins, and the Continental Divide over Virgil's Aeneid". Dictynna. 13.
- Giusti, Elena (2018). "'Recovering' the Meaning of the Aeneid". The Classical Review. 68 (1): 89–91. doi:10.1017/S0009840X17002335.
- Graves, Robert (1962). "The Virgil Cult". The Virginia Quarterly Review. 38 (1): 13–35. JSTOR 26442419.
- Griffin, Jasper (1984). "Augustus and the Poets: Caesar qui cogere posset". In Millar, Fergus; Segal, Erich (eds.). Caesar Augustus: Seven Aspects. Oxford University Press. pp. 189–218. ISBN 0-19-814851-8.
- Hahn, E. Adelaide (1925). "Vergil and the 'Under-Dog'". Transactions of the American Philological Association. 56: 185–212. doi:10.2307/282893. JSTOR 282893.
- Hardie, Philip (1998). Virgil. Greece and Rome: New Surveys in the Classics. Vol. 28. Cambridge University Press. ISBN 0-19-922342-4.
- Hardie, Philip (2013) [2006]. "Virgil's Ptolemaic Relations". Selected Papers on Ancient Literature and its Reception. Berlin: De Gruyter. pp. 142–165. doi:10.1515/9783110798852-010. ISBN 978-3-11-079242-3.
- Harrison, Stephen (1990) [1967]. "Some Views of the Aeneid in the Twentieth Century". In Harrison, Stephen (ed.). Oxford Readings in Vergil's Aeneid. Oxford University Press. pp. 1–20. ISBN 0-19-814388-5.
- Harrison, Stephen (2017). "A Voyage Around the "Harvard School"". The Classical World. 111 (1): 76–79. doi:10.1353/clw.2017.0071. JSTOR 48553373.
- Harrison, T. W. (1967). "English Virgil: The Aeneid in the XVIII Century". Philologica Pragensia. 10: 1–11, 80–92.
- Horsfall, Nicholas (1995). "Aeneid". In Horsfall, Nicholas (ed.). A Companion to the Study of Virgil. Leiden: Brill. pp. 101–216. ISBN 90-04-09559-4.
- Horsfall, Nicholas (2008). Virgil: Aeneid 2: A Commentary. Mnemosyne Supplements. Vol. 299. Brill. ISBN 978-90-04-16988-3.
- Horsfall, Nicholas (2013). Virgil: Aeneid 6: A Commentary. Vol. 2: Commentary and Appendices. Berlin: De Gruyter. doi:10.1515/9783110229912. ISBN 978-3-11-022990-5.
- Houghton, Luke B. T. (2019). "Virgil in Art". In Martindale, Charles; Mac Góráin, Fiachra (eds.). The Cambridge Companion to Virgil (2nd ed.). Cambridge University Press. pp. 141–170. doi:10.1017/9781316756102.012. ISBN 978-1-316-75610-2.
- Jackson-Knight, W. F. (1944). Roman Vergil. London: Faber and Faber. OCLC 25383686.
- Jenkyns, Richard (2008). "The Classical Tradition". In Cronin, Richard; Chapman, Alison; Harrison, Antony H. (eds.). A Companion to Victorian Poetry. Oxford: Blackwell. pp. 229–245. ISBN 978-0-631-22207-1.
- Jenkyns, Richard (2017). "The Conversation of Gentlemen". The Classical World. 111 (1): 79–83. doi:10.1353/clw.2017.0072. JSTOR 48553374.
- Johnson, W. R. (1976). Darkness Visible: A Study of Vergil's Aeneid (1st ed.). University of California Press. ISBN 0-226-25223-X.
- Johnson, W. R. (2015). Darkness Visible: A Study of Vergil's Aeneid (2nd ed.). University of Chicago Press. ISBN 978-0-226-25223-0.
- Johnson, W. R. (2017). "On The Harvard School Forty Years After". The Classical World. 111 (1): 83–84. doi:10.1353/clw.2017.0073. JSTOR 48553375.
- Kallendorf, Craig (2007). The Other Virgil: "Pessimistic" Readings of the Aeneid in Early Modern Culture. Oxford University Press. doi:10.1093/acprof:oso/9780199212361.001.0001. ISBN 978-0-19-921236-1.
- Kallendorf, Craig (2017). "The Harvard School and the Problem of History". The Classical World. 111 (1): 84–88. doi:10.1353/clw.2017.0074. JSTOR 48553376.
- Kennedy, Duncan F. (1992). "'Augustan' and 'Anti-Augustan': Reflections on Terms of Reference". In Powell, Anton (ed.). Roman Poetry and Propaganda in the Age of Augustus. Bristol Classical Paperbacks. Bristol Classical Press. pp. 26–58. ISBN 1-85399-230-5 – via Internet Archive.
- Kronenberg, Leah (2013). "Optimism and Pessimism". In Thomas, Richard F.; Ziolkowski, Jan M. (eds.). The Virgil Encyclopaedia (Online ed.). Wiley. doi:10.1002/9781118351352.wbve0968. ISBN 978-1-118-35135-2.
- Lactantius: The Divine Institutes: Books I–VII. The Fathers of the Church: A New Translation. Vol. 49. Translated by McDonald, Mary Francis. Washington, D.C.: The Catholic University of America Press. 1964. LCCN 64-18669 – via Internet Archive.
- Laird, Andrew (2002). "Juan Luis de la Cerda and the Predicament of Commentary". In Gibson, Roy K.; Shuttleworth Kraus, Christina (eds.). The Classical Commentary: Histories, Practices, Theory. Mnemosyne Supplements. Vol. 232. Leiden: Brill. pp. 171–203. doi:10.1163/9789047400943_009. ISBN 90-04-12153-6.
- Lyne, R. O. A. M. (1983). "Vergil and the Politics of War". The Classical Quarterly. 33 (1): 188–203. doi:10.1017/S0009838800034376. JSTOR 638655.
- Lyne, R. O. A. M. (1987). Further Voices in Vergil's Aeneid. Oxford University Press. ISBN 0-19-814092-4.
- Makaryk, Irena, ed. (1993). "New Criticism". Encyclopedia of Contemporary Literary Theory: Approaches, Scholars, Terms. University of Toronto Press. pp. 120–124. ISBN 0-8020-6860-X.
- Martindale, Charles (2019). "Introduction". The Cambridge Companion to Virgil. Cambridge: Cambridge University Press. pp. 1–20. doi:10.1017/9781316756102.003. ISBN 9781316756102.
- Moorton, Richard F. (1989). "The Innocence of Italy in Virgil's Aeneid". The American Journal of Philology. 110 (1): 105–130. doi:10.2307/294956. JSTOR 294956.
- Murray, John (1945). "Review: Roman Virgil". Studies: An Irish Quarterly Review. 34 (133): 65–77. JSTOR 30099544.
- O'Hara, James J. (2013). "Harvard School". In Thomas, Richard F.; Ziolkowski, Jan M. (eds.). The Virgil Encyclopaedia (Online ed.). Wiley. pp. 588–589. doi:10.1002/9781118351352.wbve0968. ISBN 978-1-118-35135-2.
- O'Hara, James J. (2017). "Response to Pandey and Torlone, with Brief Remarks on the Harvard School". The Classical World. 111 (1): 47–52. doi:10.1353/clw.2017.0064. JSTOR 48553366.
- Pandey, Nandini B. (2017). "Sowing the Seeds of War: The Aeneid's Prehistory of Interpretive Contestation and Appropriation". The Classical World. 111: 7–25. doi:10.1353/clw.2017.0062. JSTOR 48553364.
- Parry, Adam (1963). "The Two Voices of Virgil's Aeneid". Arion: A Journal of the Humanities and the Classics. 2 (4): 66–80. JSTOR 20162871.
- Perkell, Christine G. (1999). Reading Vergil's Aeneid: An Interpretative Guide. Tulsa: University of Oklahoma Press. ISBN 0-8061-3139-X.
- Poletti, Beatrice (2023). Dionysius and the City of Rome: Portraits of Founders in the Roman Antiquities. London: Bloomsbury. ISBN 979-8-8818-8189-4.
- Powell, Anton (2017). "The Harvard School, Virgilm and Political History: Pure Innocence or Pure in No Sense?". The Classical World. 111 (1): 96–101. doi:10.1353/clw.2017.0078. JSTOR 48553380.
- Putnam, Michael (1965). The Poetry of the Aeneid: Four Studies in Imaginative Unity and Design. Cambridge, Massachusetts: Harvard University Press. OCLC 310768 – via Internet Archive.
- Putnam, Michael (1995). Virgil's Aeneid: Interpretation and Influence. Chapel Hill: The University of North Carolina Press. ISBN 0-8078-4499-3.
- Putnam, Michael, ed. (1981). Arethusa. 14: Vergil: 2000 Years. JSTOR i26308070.
- Putnam, Michael (1996). "The Lyric Genius of the Aeneid". Arion: A Journal of the Humanities and the Classics. 3rd. 3 (2/3): 81–101. JSTOR 20163574.
- Quinn, Stephanie (2000). Why Vergil? A Collection of Interpretations. Wauconda: Bolchazy-Carducci Publishers. ISBN 0-86516-418-5.
- Raffel, Burton (2006). Introduction. The Tempest. By Shakespeare, William. Raffel, Burton (ed.). New Haven: Yale University Press. pp. xv–xxx. ISBN 0-300-13830-X. JSTOR j.ctt1njkxr.
- Reed, Nicholas (1973). "The Gates of Sleep in Aeneid 6". The Classical Quarterly. 23 (2): 311–315. doi:10.1017/S000983880003682X. JSTOR 638188.
- Schiesaro, Alessandro (2008). "Furthest Voices in Virgil's Dido" (PDF). Studi Italiani di Filologia Classica. 100: 60–109, 194–245.
- Segal, Charles (1968). "The Hesitation of the Golden Bough: A Reexamination". Hermes. 96 (1): 74–79. JSTOR 4475491.
- Segal, Charles (1990). "Dido's Hesitation in Aeneid 4". The Classical World. 84 (1): 1–12. doi:10.2307/4350715. JSTOR 4350715.
- Sforza, Francesco (1935). "The Problem of Virgil". The Classical Review. 49 (3): 97–108. doi:10.1017/S0009840X00067822. JSTOR 697454.
- Stahl, Hans-Peter (2017). "The Harvard School: Memoir of The Black Sheep". The Classical World. 111 (1): 108–115. doi:10.1353/clw.2017.0064. JSTOR 48553384.
- Tarrant, Richard J. (1997). "Poetry and Power: Virgil's Poetry in Contemporary Context". In Martindale, Charles (ed.). The Cambridge Companion to Virgil. Cambridge University Press. pp. 169–187. ISBN 0-521-49885-6.
- Tarrant, Richard J., ed. (2012). Virgil: Aeneid Book XII. Cambridge Greek and Latin Classics. Cambridge University Press. ISBN 978-0-521-31363-6.
- Thomas, Richard F. (2001). Virgil and the Augustan Reception. Cambridge University Press. doi:10.1017/CBO9780511482403. ISBN 0-511-48240-X.
- Thomas, Richard F. (2013). "'Two Voices' Theory". In Thomas, Richard F.; Ziolkowski, Jan M. (eds.). The Virgil Encyclopaedia (Online ed.). Wiley. pp. 1310–1311. doi:10.1002/9781118351352.wbve2140. ISBN 978-1-118-35135-2.
- Weinbrot, Howard D. (1978). Augustus Caesar in "Augustan" England: The Decline of a Classical Norm. Princeton University Press. OCLC 905863518 – via Project MUSE.
- West, David (1991). Introduction. The Aeneid: A New Prose Translation. By Virgil. Penguin Classics. Translated by West, David. London: Penguin. pp. vii–xiii. ISBN 0-14-044932-9.
- Williams, R. Deryck (1964). "The Sixth Book of the Aeneid". Greece and Rome. 11 (1): 48–63. doi:10.1017/S0017383500012663.
- Williams, R. Deryck (1990) [1960]. "The Purpose of the Aeneid". In Harrison, Stephen (ed.). Oxford Readings in Vergil's Aeneid. Oxford University Press. pp. 21–36. ISBN 0-19-814388-5.
- Zetzel, James (2017). "The "Harvard School": A Historical Note by an Alumnus". The Classical World. 111 (1): 125–128. doi:10.1353/clw.2017.0086. JSTOR 48553388.

== See also ==
- Political commentary of the Aeneid
