= Darkness Visible: A Study of Vergil's Aeneid =

Academic monograph

- Cover of the first edition
- Author: W. R. Johnson
- Language: English
- Subject: Vergil's Aeneid
- Published: 1976
- Publisher: University of California Press
- Pages: 179
- ISBN: 978-0-520-03848-6

Darkness Visible: A Study of Vergil's Aeneid is an academic monograph by the American Latinist W. R. Johnson. Published in 1976 by University of California Press, the book presents an interpretation of the Aeneid, an epic by the Roman poet Vergil. Claiming to abandon previously dominant historical-political reading, Johnson argues that the poem is at its heart concerned with the darkness of the human condition.

Darkness Visible was met with mixed reviews with commentators praising its central claims but criticising its argumentation, style, and bibliographic documentation. The book is also credited with coining the term "Harvard School" to describe a brand of pessimistic Vergil scholarship produced in the English-speaking world. Even though the designation established itself in academic discourse, it was rejected in 1995 by one of the school's proponents, Wendell Clausen.

== Publication ==
Darkness Visible: A Study of Vergil's Aeneid was written by the American classicist W. R. Johnson and published by University of California Press in 1976. The original edition had 179 pages. In 2015, University of Chicago Press published a second edition of the work.

== Summary ==
In a first expository chapter ('Eliot's Myth and Vergil's Fictions'), Johnson reviews critical opinions about Vergil's Aeneid in the 20th century. He describes that the poem has been understood as a coherent historical and political allegory. Within this allegorical interpretation, he identifies two opposing viewpoints. The first of these views the Aeneid as a wholehearted endorsement of the political order established by Augustus, the first Roman emperor. Johnson labels this school of thought 'optimistic' or 'European' and lists as its proponents among others the British poet T. S. Eliot, the German philologists Viktor Pöschl and Karl Büchner, and the American classicist Brooks Otis. The other fraction of critics, described as the 'pessimistic' or 'Harvard' school, interprets the poem as a nihilistic critique of the Augustan regime; its main proponents, according to Johnson, are the American classicists Michael C. J. Putnam, Robert Angus Brooks, Wendell Clausen, and Adam Parry. He rejects both of these approaches and proposes to interpret the Aeneid as a polysemantic work of literature, following a method devised by the French bible scholar Nicholas of Lyra which divides allegories into different levels of meaning.

The book's second chapter ('Lessing, Auerbach, Gombrich: The Norm of Reality and the Spectrum of Decorum') analyses Vergil's style by juxtaposing his symbolic imagery with the realism of the Homeric epics, a method originally devised by the German critic Erich Auerbach. In several case studies taken from the poem, Johnson argues that Vergil tends to create vague, impressionistic images that lack the clarity of the Homeric poets but illustrate the complexity of the human condition. Chapter Three ('Varia Confusus Imagine Rerum') focuses on a sequence of passages (notably the deaths of Dido and Turnus), in which the goddess Juno, the poem's antagonist, plays an important role. Johnson agrees that Juno represents the powers of irrationality and darkness looming over the poem's characters. The ending of the poem, where Aeneas gives in to his merciless fury and kills Turnus, is thus interpreted as a victory for the goddess, even though she had sought to protect Turnus.

The final chapter ('The Worlds Vergil Lived In') uses the observations of the preceding two chapters to arrive at an overall interpretation of the poem. Johnson here employs the multiple levels of meaning proposed by Nicolaus of Lyra. He argues that Aeneid depicts on the first, allegorical level the insecurities of Roman society during the tumultuous transition from the Roman Republic to the Roman Empire, which happened during Vergil's lifetime. He identifies as the poem's metaphysical concern a struggle between the rationalism of Classical Greek philosophy and what Johnson describes as 'mystery religions' such as Neopythagoreanism, whose growing influence he sees in the poem's powerful personifications of evil in characters such as Juno and Alecto. His third interpretation of the poem is ethical: through the sufferings of the Aeneas who tries to resist the surrounding darkness, Vergil holds up the rational principles of Epicureanism which, according to Johnson, formed an important part of his intellectual background.

== Reception ==
The book received mixed reviews upon publication. The British Latinist Nicholas Horsfall considered it "difficult, wayward, and provocative" while conceding that it was "deeply stimulating, often entertaining, and strikingly independent in outlook". He accepted Johnson's claim that the world of the Aeneid is chaotic and dark, but criticised the book for a number of inaccuracies including interpretation, bibliographic documentation, and awareness of contemporary scholarship. In a review for Arion, the classicist William Porter praised the book for rejecting the predominant social-political interpretation of the poem. Sharing Horsfall's assessment, he endorsed the book's analysis of Vergil's negative imagery but wrote that Johnson failed to see the wider implications of his observations and pursued his main line of argumentation "to the exclusion of all others".

Several reviewers commented on Johnson's writing style. For the Vergil scholar Harry Rutledge, the book's style exhibited "the remarkable qualities of the oracular, the arcane, the arrestingly simple", although it suffered from the "aphoristic brevity" of its arguments. The poet and classicist K. W. Gransden, on the other hand, thought that Johnson had a tendency to unnecessary obscurity and mystification. He also objected to the use of untranslated quotation of ancient Greek and the lack of bibliographic documentation.

== Harvard school ==
In the first chapter, Johnson divides previous scholarship of the Aeneid into a 'European' and a 'Harvard' school. The latter term in particular became a standard descriptor for the pessimistic scholarship of the poem, produced in the English-speaking world. In 1995, Clausen, whom Johnson had identified as a proponent of the Harvard School, published a short article about the term. Crediting Johnson with inventing it, he argues that the designation is a misnomer since most of the ideas central to his school of thought originated at places other than Harvard University. Instead, Clausen suggests that he and Parry formed some of their thoughts about the poem while working at Amherst College.

== Bibliography ==
- Gransden, Karl (1978). "Review: The Virgil De Nos Jours". The Classical Review. 28: 247–249. doi:10.1017/S0009840X00228205. ISSN 0009-840X. JSTOR 3062245. S2CID 164147641.
- Clausen, Wendell (1995). "Appendix". In Horsfall, Nicholas (ed.). A Companion to the Study of Virgil. Leiden: Brill Publishers. pp. 313–314. ISBN 978-0-585-34024-1.
- Horsfall, Nicholas (1979). "Review of W. R. Johnson 'Darkness Visible: A Study of Vergil's Aeneid'". Journal of Roman Studies. 69: 231–234. doi:10.2307/299096. ISSN 0075-4358. JSTOR 299096.
- Porter, William (1976). "Review: A Look at Vergil's Negative Image". Arion. 3: 493–506. ISSN 0095-5809. JSTOR 20163436.
- Rutledge, Harry (1977). "Review of R. W. Johnson Darkness Visible: A Study of Vergil's Aeneid". Vergilius. 23: 71–74. ISSN 0506-7294. JSTOR 41591778.
- Tarrant, Richard (2012). Virgil: Aeneid Book XII. Cambridge: Cambridge University Press. ISBN 978-1-316-09859-2.
