= W. R. Johnson =

American classical scholar (1933–2024)

- Photographed in 1984
- Born: July 9, 1933; Trinidad, Colorado, United States
- Died: April 13, 2024 (aged 90)

Academic background
- Education: University of California, Berkeley

Academic work
- Discipline: Classical studies
- Sub-discipline: Latin poetry
- Institutions: University of California, Berkeley; Cornell University; University of Chicago
- Notable works: Darkness Visible: A Study of Vergil's Aeneid (1976)

Walter Ralph Johnson (July 9, 1933 – April 13, 2024), commonly known as W. Ralph Johnson and published as W. R. Johnson, was an American classicist. He was the John Matthews Manly Distinguished Service Professor in the Department of Classics at the University of Chicago from 1989 to 1998. He coined the term "Harvard School" to describe interpretations of the Aeneid as opposed to the Roman emperor Augustus and his ideology.

== Career ==
Born in Trinidad, Colorado, on July 9, 1933, Johnson studied at the University of California, Berkeley, graduating BA in 1961 and MA in 1963 before completing his PhD there in 1967. He taught at Berkeley from 1966 to 1974, then Cornell University until 1981. He was then professor of classical languages and literatures at the University of Chicago from 1981 to 1988; in 1989, he became the John Matthews Manly Distinguished Service Professor at Chicago. He retired in 1998, remaining an emeritus professor at Chicago until his death on April 13, 2024.

Johnson's 1976 Darkness Visible: A Study of Vergil's "Aeneid" introduced the term Harvard School for interpretations of the poem as containing messages of dissent against the emperor Augustus and his imperialistic ideology. Johnson identified the members of the Harvard School as Adam Parry, Wendell Clausen, R. A. Brooks, and Michael Putnam, all of whom had at some point worked at Harvard University. The classicist James Zetzel later suggested that the idea of the Harvard School as a coherent ideological grouping was invented by Johnson as an oversimplification, intended to allow him to position himself as intermediate between it and a similarly simplified characterization of the Augustan interpretation of the poem. In 2013, the classicist James O'Hara suggested that Johnson should himself be considered part of the Harvard School.

== Published works ==
- W. R. Johnson, Luxuriance and Economy: Cicero and the Alien Style, University of California Publications in Classical Studies, 6 (Berkeley: University of California Press, 1971)
- W. R. Johnson, Darkness Visible: A Study of Vergil's Aeneid (Berkeley: University of California Press, 1976)
- W. R. Johnson, The Idea of Lyric: Lyric Modes in Ancient and Modern Poetry (Berkeley: University of California Press, 1982)
- W. R. Johnson, Momentary Monsters: Lucan and His Heroes (Ithaca and London: Cornell University Press, 1987)
- W. R. Johnson, Horace and the Dialectic of Freedom: Readings in Epistles 1 (Ithaca and London: Cornell University Press, 1993)
- W. R. Johnson, Lucretius and the Modern World (London: Duckworth, 2000)
- W. R. Johnson, A Latin Lover in Ancient Rome: Readings in Propertius and His Genre (Columbus: Ohio State University Press, 2009)
