= Oliver Lyne =

British classical scholar (1944–2005)

- Born: Richard Oliver Allen Marcus Lyne; 21 December 1944; Peterborough, England
- Died: 17 March 2005 (aged 60); Marche, Italy
- Other name: R.O.A.M. Lyne
- Spouse: Linda Lyne (m. 1969)
- Relatives: Adrian Lyne (brother)

Academic background
- Education: St John's College, Cambridge

Academic work
- Discipline: Classical studies
- Sub-discipline: Latin poetry

Richard Oliver Allen Marcus Lyne (21 December 1944 – 17 March 2005), also known as R. O. A. M. Lyne, was a British academic and classicist specialising in Latin poetry. He was a tutor in classics at Balliol College and Professor of Classical Languages and Literature at the University of Oxford. His 1987 book Further Voices in Virgil's "Aeneid" was an important text in the Harvard School of analysis of the Aeneid, which saw the poem as containing implicit messages casting doubt upon the imperialistic ideology of the Roman emperor Augustus.

== Early life ==
Lyne was born on 21 December 1944 in Peterborough, Northamptonshire, England, to Richard and Rosalind Lyne. He was educated at Highgate School, then an all-boys private school in London, where his father was a teacher of Latin. He studied classics at St John's College, Cambridge. His tutor was Guy Lee. In 1966, he graduated with a first class Bachelor of Arts (BA) degree. He completed his Doctor of Philosophy (PhD) degree, also from the University of Cambridge, in 1970. His doctoral supervisor was F. R. D. Goodyear.

== Academic career ==
While undertaking his doctorate, Lyne held two short-term fellowships at Fitzwilliam College, Cambridge, and at Churchill College, Cambridge. In 1971, he moved to the University of Oxford where he became a Fellow of Balliol College. In 1999, he was appointed Professor of Classical Languages and Literature.

Lyne was considered a member of the Harvard School, which interpreted Virgil's Aeneid as a pessimistic work that questioned the imperialist ideology of the emperor Augustus. Lyne's 1987 Further Voices in Virgil's "Aeneid" developed the argument made in 1963 by Adam Parry, a founding member of the Harvard School, that the poem contained a "private voice" undercutting its surface messages of propaganda. Lyne argues that these operate through Virgil's inclusion of provocative material, his juxtaposition of material within the poem, and his use of imagery, ambiguity and intertextual allusion.

== Death ==
On 17 March 2005, Lyne died at the age of 60 having suffered a cerebral haemorrhage while at his holiday home located in Marche, Italy.

An edited volume, R. O. A. M. Lyne: Collected Papers on Latin Poetry, was published in 2007 as a memorial to him; the introduction was written by Stephen Harrison.

== Personal life ==
Lyne married Linda (née Rees) in 1969. He had met her when they were both students. Together they had two children: Raphael, born 1971, and Rosy, born 1973.

His older brother is Adrian Lyne, a film director.

== Select works ==
- Ciris: A Poem Attributed to Vergil. Cambridge: Cambridge University Press. 1978. ISBN 052121727X.
- The Latin Love Poets from Catullus to Horace. Oxford: Clarendon Press. 1980. ISBN 0198144539.
- Further Voices in Vergil's Aeneid. Oxford: Clarendon Press. 1987. ISBN 019814461X.
- Words and the Poet: Characteristic Techniques of Style in Vergil's Aeneid. Oxford: Clarendon Press. 1989. ISBN 0198148968.
- Horace: Behind the Public Poetry. New Haven: Yale University Press. 1995. ISBN 0300063229.
