= Robert Angus Brooks =

American philologist (1920–1976)

- Born: October 16, 1920; Calcutta, India
- Died: April 1, 1976 (aged 55); Washington, D.C.
- Citizenship: United States

Academic background
- Education: Harvard College (AB, PhD)
- Thesis: Ennius and Roman Tragedy (1949)

Academic work
- Discipline: Classical philology
- Institutions: Harvard College; Smithsonian Institution
- Notable students: Kenneth J. Reckford
- Military career
- Branch: United States Army Air Forces
- Service years: 1942–1945
- Rank: Captain
- Units: 9th Photo Intelligence Detachment, Seventh Air Force
- Wars: Second World War

Robert Angus Brooks (October 16, 1920 – April 1, 1976) was an American scholar of Latin and under secretary at the Smithsonian Institution. He also served as Assistant Secretary of the Army for Installations and Logistics under the Johnson Administration.

Brooks was born in Calcutta in India; his mother was Scottish and his father an American jute manufacturer. From the age of three, he attended school in Scotland. The family moved in 1934 to the United States, and Brooks accordingly moved to Roxbury Latin School in Massachusetts, from which he proceeded to Harvard College. He graduated summa cum laude in 1940, and was made a junior fellow of Harvard's Society of Fellows in 1942. Brooks's academic studies were interrupted by World War II, in which he served as an intelligence officer in the United States Army Air Forces. After the war he studied at Harvard for a PhD, which was granted in 1949 with a thesis on the Roman writer Ennius.

Brooks took an academic post at Harvard after receiving his doctorate, and began work on a study of the Golden Bough, an episode in Virgil's Aeneid. He was dismissed in 1951, but published the results of his research in 1953 as "Discolor aura: Reflections on the Golden Bough". The article became a founding text of the Harvard School, which challenged the view of the Aeneid as a heroic poem written to glorify the emperor Augustus. Upon leaving Harvard, he became an editor and analyst at Harbridge House, a Boston management consulting company. He was appointed Assistant Secretary of the Army for Installations and Logistics in 1965, during the Vietnam War, and served in that capacity until 1969.

Following his government service, Brooks spent two years as president of Harbridge House, then became deputy under secretary of the Smithsonian Institution. During his time there he collaborated on a translation of Euripides's Children of Heracles and began writing a book on the ancient Museum of Alexandria. As well as his classical studies, Brooks was a prolific actor, often performing in Greek- and Latin-language versions of ancient plays, and a poet whose works were published in The New Yorker and The Atlantic.

== Life and career ==
Robert Angus Brooks, known as "Rab", was born in Calcutta in India on October 16, 1920. His parents were Milton Brooks, an American jute manufacturer, and Mabel Anderson Barnet (née Spence), originally from Scotland. He was sent to school in Scotland at the age of three; from 1928, when he was seven years old, he attended Dalhousie Castle School outside Edinburgh as a boarder. He remained there until 1934; his headmaster's report noted that he had read widely in both Latin and Greek by the age of fourteen. In that year, the family moved to the United States, and Brooks was enrolled at Roxbury Latin School in Massachusetts. He left Roxbury in 1936 for Harvard College, from which he graduated summa cum laude in 1940. While at Harvard he acted in an Ancient Greek–language production of Aristophanes's Birds in 1936, and in productions under Phyllis Stoll, who taught drama at the nearby Erskine School. He was made a junior fellow of Harvard's Society of Fellows in 1942.

During World War II, Brooks served in the United States Army Air Forces as an intelligence officer. He joined the 9th Photo Intelligence Detachment of the Seventh Air Force in 1942, was deployed to the Pacific Theater, and reached the rank of captain in 1945. Upon demobilization he returned to Harvard to work for the Society of Fellows, and spent a year studying abroad in Rome. He received his PhD from Harvard in 1949, with a thesis titled "Ennius and Roman Tragedy". In the same year, he was awarded a college prize for an original essay in Latin, and directed a performance of Plautus's Roman comedy Miles Gloriosus, performed by the Harvard Classical Players, a society which he had himself revived. He then directed another Plautine comedy, the Pseudolus, in 1950, and added to the script Latin verses of his own composition to give one of his actresses a more prominent role.

Upon receiving his doctorate, Brooks took an academic job at Harvard as an instructor in classics. He began a study of the Golden Bough, an episode in the Aeneid, an epic poem by the Roman writer Virgil. Between 1950 and 1965 Brooks was a member of the Poet's Theater in Cambridge, Massachusetts, and frequently played leading roles in its productions. He was dismissed from Harvard in 1951. Among his last students there was Kenneth J. Reckford, who followed his class on Roman satire in the spring of 1951. His study of the Golden Bough was eventually published in 1953 as "Discolor aura: Reflections on the Golden Bough". Wendell Clausen and Stephen Harrison list it among the foundational works of the Harvard School, a movement in Virgilian criticism that challenged the view of the Aeneid as a heroic poem written to glorify the emperor Augustus. The article is often considered the first work of the movement.

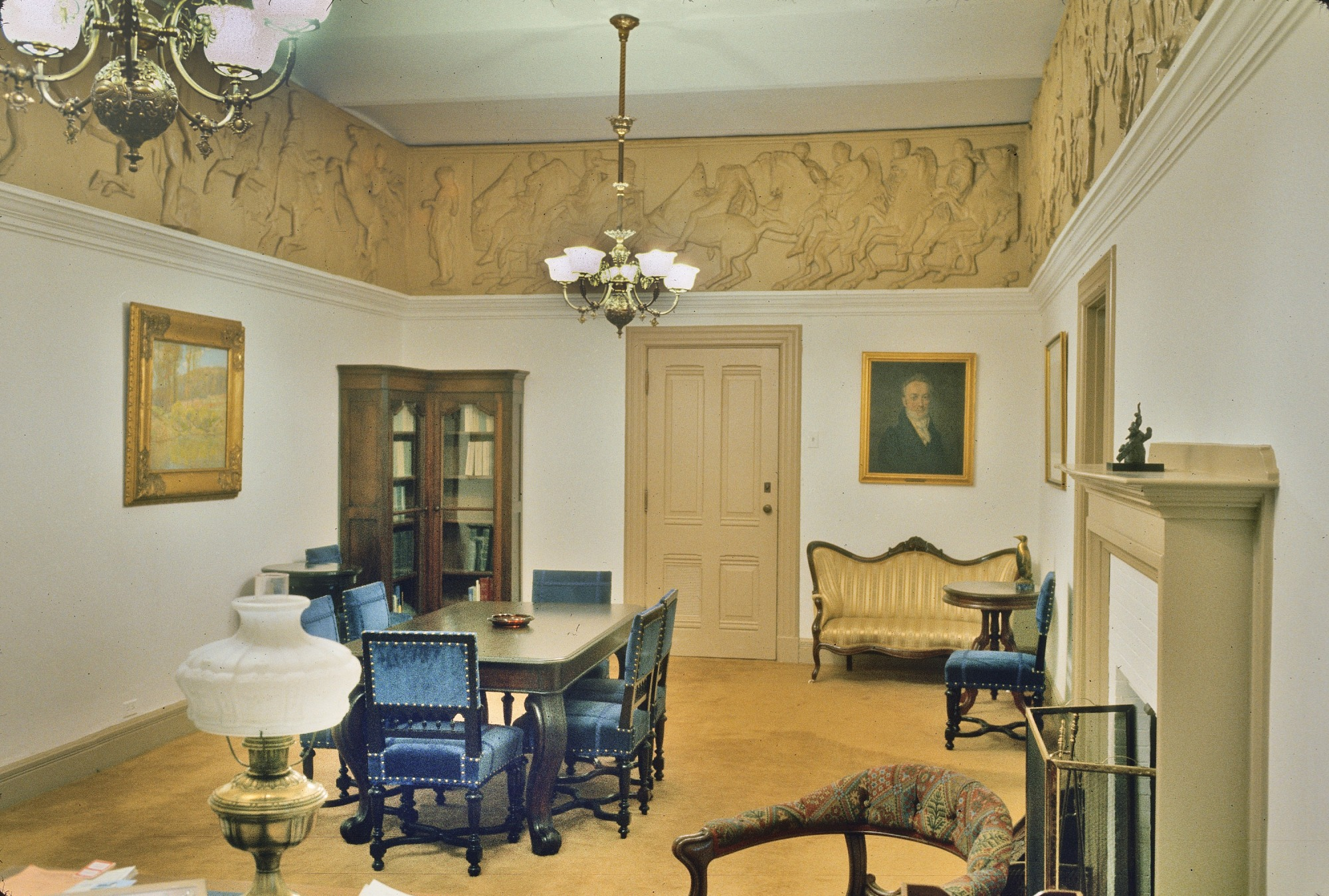
Brooks's office (Room 208) at the Smithsonian, photographed in 1972, including a replica of parts of the Parthenon Frieze

Brooks became an editor and analyst at Harbridge House, a Boston management consulting company, in 1951. In 1956, he returned to Harvard to direct a production of Sophocles's Oedipus at Colonus; the lead actor left the production on the eve of the dress rehearsal, and Brooks took on the role of Oedipus. By 1965, he was director of Harbridge House, having previously been promoted to vice president of the company. One of the founders of Harbridge House was Paul Ignatius, a prominent official in the Department of Defense and later Secretary of the Navy. In 1965 (during the Vietnam War), perhaps through his connection to Ignatius, Brooks was appointed Assistant Secretary of the Army for Installations and Logistics. In this role he established the US Army's School of Logistics in Petersburg, Virginia.

After retiring from government service in 1969, Brooks spent two years as president of Harbridge House, before taking a post as deputy under secretary of the Smithsonian Institution. During his time there he published scholarly papers, including a collaboration with Henry Taylor on a new translation of Euripides's Children of Heracles, and began writing a book on the ancient Museum of Alexandria.

Brooks was a poet, whose works were published (among others) in The Atlantic and The New Yorker. He married Jane S. Kochmann on January 2, 1943. He died on April 1, 1976, in Washington D.C.

== Published works ==
- Brooks, Robert A. (1953). "Discolor aura: Reflections on the Golden Bough". The American Journal of Philology. 74 (3): 260–280. JSTOR 292310.
- — (October 1973). "In the Tunnel". The Atlantic.
- — (1981) [1949]. Ennius and Roman Tragedy. Monographs in Classical Studies. New York: Arno Press. ISBN 0-405-14030-4.
- — (1981). Introduction. Children of Heracles. By Euripides. Greek Tragedy in New Translations. Translated by Taylor, Henry; Brooks, Robert Angus. New York: Oxford University Press. pp. 3–26. ISBN 0-19-502914-3.

== Works cited ==
- Arrowsmith, William (1981). "Editor's Foreword". Children of Heracles. By Euripides. Greek Tragedy in New Translations. Translated by Taylor, Henry; Brooks, Robert Angus. New York: Oxford University Press. pp. i–xii. ISBN 0-19-502914-3.
- Clausen, Wendell (1995). "Appendix". A Companion to the Study of Virgil. By Horsfall, Nicholas. Mnemosyne Supplements. Vol. 151. Leiden: Brill. pp. 313–314. ISBN 90-04-09559-4. ISSN 0169-8958.
- Goldstein, Richard (6 November 2025). "Paul Ignatius, 104, Dies; Navy Secretary and Vietnam-era Defense Official". The New York Times.
- Harrison, Stephen (1990) [1967]. "Some Views of the Aeneid in the Twentieth Century". In Harrison, Stephen (ed.). Oxford Readings in Vergil's Aeneid. Oxford University Press. pp. 1–20. ISBN 0-19-814388-5.
- Harrison, Stephen (2017). "A Voyage Around the 'Harvard School'". The Classical World. 111 (1): 76–79. doi:10.1353/clw.2017.0071. JSTOR 48553373.
- Reckford, Kenneth J. (1981). Foreword. Ennius and Roman Tragedy. By Brooks, Robert Angus. New York: Arno Press. pp. 1–14. ISBN 0-405-14030-4.
