= Harry Jocelyn =

Australian Latinist and classical scholar

Henry David Jocelyn, FBA, FAHA (1933–2000), commonly known as Harry Jocelyn, was an Australian Latinist and classical scholar. He was the Hulme Professor of Latin at the University of Manchester from 1973 to 1996.

== Early life and education ==
Born on 22 August 1933 at Bega, New South Wales, Jocelyn's father John Daniel Jocelyn was a police officer; both he and Jocelyn's mother Phyllis Irene (née Burton) were born in Australia, though John was descended from English migrants who settled in the goldfields and Phyllis from English and Irish convicts transported to Australia. In 1944 the family moved to a suburb of Sydney and Harry won a place at Canterbury Boys' High School two years later, where he enjoyed classics and ranked top of his year. From 1951, he read classics at the University of Sydney, graduating in 1955 with a first-class degree for which he received two university medals. Among his chief influences were G. P. Shipp, R. E. Smith, A. J. Dunston and A. H. McDonald. Supported by a travelling scholarship from Sydney, Jocelyn studied at St John's College, Cambridge (1955–57), completing part II of the classical tripos. He received the Sandys (1957) and Craven (1958) studentships from Cambridge and was student at the British School at Rome from 1957 to 1959. During that time, he completed doctoral studies at Cambridge under C. O. Brink. Among his other influences were Scevola Mariotti. His PhD was awarded in 1963.

== Career ==
By that time, Jocelyn had been a lecturer in Latin at the University of Sydney for three years; he was promoted to a senior lectureship in 1964 and a readership two years later. He published his doctoral dissertation as The Tragedies of Ennius in 1967 and was promoted to a professorship at Sydney in 1970. In 1972, he published a book-length translation, Regnier de Graaf on the Human Reproductive Organs in the Journal of Reproduction and Fertility. He was appointed Hulme Professor of Latin at the University of Manchester in 1973, succeeding George Kerferd; his appointment was almost certainly made on the advice of Smith, who had moved to Manchester from Sydney. Jocelyn remained there for 23 years, retiring in 1996. Though his Tragedies of Ennius would be his only book, he edited Festschrifts for Brink and his former Cambridge contemporary F. R. D. Goodyear; he also wrote over 80 articles, 50 chapters and other papers, and 130 reviews. He was elected a fellow of the Australian Academy of the Humanities in 1970 and a fellow of the British Academy in 1982. He was awarded an honorary doctorate by the University of Sydney in 1995. Aside from his classical scholarship, Jocelyn was noted for his outspoken nature. He died on 22 October 2000; his wife, Margaret, and their two children survived him.
