= Political commentary of the Aeneid =

The Aeneid has been analyzed by scholars of several different generations and schools of thought to try to determine the political commentary that Virgil had hoped to portray. The major schools of thought include the overarching idea that Virgil had written a story that parallels Roman history at the time it was written as well as messages both in support of and against the rule of Augustus Caesar. Finally, it has been argued that Virgil had a stance on geopolitics which he conveys in the actions of Aeneas and his crew.

== Parallels with Roman history ==
It has been claimed that Virgil wrote the Aeneid to reflect the Roman political stance of his time. Virgil does this primarily by splitting the story into two parts. The first half shows an obsession with the fall of Troy, together with failed attempts to establish cities during Aeneas' wanderings; while the second half depicts victory in battle and the establishment of a new Troy at Rome. This mirrors Rome's disestablishment of the republic after the strife of a civil war, and the establishment of peace and prosperity with the new Roman Empire. These reflect Augustan propaganda which asks that his people not forget the repetition of the past of civil war but remember and repeat it in order to conquer their problems in support of his new reign of the empire.

== Positive images of Augustus Caesar's rule ==
The Aeneid was written during a period of political unrest in Rome. The Roman republic had effectively been abolished, and Octavian (Augustus Caesar) had taken over as the leader of the new Roman empire. The Aeneid was written to praise Augustus by drawing parallels between him and the protagonist, Aeneas. Virgil does so by mirroring Caesar with Aeneas and by creating a direct lineage between Aeneas and Augustus.

Aeneas is the founder of the new city of Rome, while Octavian, as the first Roman emperor, founded a new and improved Rome. Specifically, Aeneas seeks to establish a new nation based on that of Italy and Troy, just as Augustus sought to create a new Rome based on Rome's older traditions. These parallels, combined with Aeneas' portrayal as a strong and powerful leader, establish his means of promoting Augustus as a great leader.

Virgil creates a common ancestry between Aeneas and Augustus by interacting with the Roman tradition of viewing Romulus as the founder of Rome. Romulus is known as the son of Mars and a vestal virgin. According to the historian Livy, this vestal virgin's name was Rhea Silvia, who is described in Book I of the Aeneid as a descendant of Aeneas. Virgil establishes a stronger connection of Silvia to the Trojans by changing her name in the epic to Ilia. This new name connects her by its similarity to the name "Ilium", another name for the city of Troy, and because it is the feminine form of both Ilus (Aeneas' great-great-grandfather) and Ilus, the second name of Ascanius before the fall of Troy.

Virgil also references Julius Caesar's claim to divine ancestry as a descendant of Venus and Anchises, supporting this claim in his text. In a speech by Jupiter, he references a "Trojan Caesar" as a descendant of Ascanius (by the name of Iulus) and therefore of Venus:

"from this noble line shall be born the Trojan Caesar... a Julius, name descended from great lulus!"

This text also reminds the audience of the bloodline shared between Aeneas and Augustus.

In Book VI, when Aeneas is in Elysium, his father describes descendants who will one day inherit their name. He describes Aeneas' children, followed by Romulus, then skips ahead to Augustus Caesar. This creates the illusion of a direct connection between Caesar and Romulus.

== Warning against Caesar's rule ==
Within the context of the Aeneid there are also warnings against the new political regime. Virgil questions whether the new political foundation promised by Caesar will actually be an escape from the repetitions of the civil war. Caesar claims that good repetition can replace the bad, but Virgil asks in his epic whether repetition can be a good thing at all. This is shown when Anchises misreads the oracle of Delos, leading to the failure of the settlement on Crete. This is intended to indicate how an obsession with the former Troy interferes with the goal of establishing a new one, thus representing the failure in a focus on the past.

When Anchises interprets the Delian oracle he states that the Trojan Ida got her name from the Cretan mountain. The repetition of "Idaeus/idaeumque" reflects their attempts to repeat the past by finding likeness in new land. This repetition suggests their desire for the familiar rather than willingness to confront something new. This is parallel to Caesar's claim of good repetition replacing the bad.

== Geopolitics ==
Virgil also wishes to express his concerns for the geopolitics of Rome. He does so by depicting a war against nature by Aeneas and his men. There are several examples of this, starting early in the epic when Aeneas has to kill seven stags, which is notable as one of the first events in the story.

Other occurrences of Aeneas and his men waging war against nature include:

- After arriving in Thrace, Aeneas pulls out seven trees, first making the roots bleed, then eliciting a pitiful groan on the last pull.
- The Trojans come across goats and cattle which they kill not for sacrifice but as hunters.
- When the crew arrives in Cumae, they damage nature by taking prey and chopping down trees.
- In Book IX, the Trojans cut down the primeval forests in order to build the altar for Misenus' tomb.
- Tarchon establishes a view of nature as hostile and something to overcome by referring to the land as hostile in Book X.

Upon the first sight of Italy, Virgil repeatedly refers to the natural wealth of the land, writing about the great soil and the Tiber River. This is accompanied by much destruction of that land by the Trojans as depicted by the use of nature for strategy in Book XI, and the destruction of the trees by Aeneas and his men late in Book XII. In Virgil's most significant display of war against nature, the Trojans cut down a sacred olive tree in preparation of an open battlefield. This sacred tree represents a focus on preservation of nature, and is therefore in opposition to the political values of the contemporary Roman Empire. This violence opens a commentary on the establishment of the Empire based on destruction. It mirrors the chaos of the Italian countryside during Virgil's time. Through the events of the Aeneid, Virgil hopes to reveal the consequences of Aeneas' mission as the destruction of Italy's natural environment.

== See also ==
- Harvard School
