= James O'Hara (Latinist) =

James O'Hara (born 1959) is an American classicist and scholar of Latin literature. He is the George L. Paddison Professor of Latin at the University of North Carolina at Chapel Hill.

O'Hara graduated from the College of the Holy Cross with a B.A. in classics in 1981 and earned his Ph.D. in classics from the University of Michigan in 1986. After receiving his doctorate, he was a professor of classical studies at Wesleyan University from 1986 to 2001.

== Books ==
- Death and the Optimistic Prophecy in Vergil’s Aeneid (Princeton University Press, 1990)
- True Names: Vergil and the Alexandrian Tradition of Etymological Wordplay (University of Michigan Press, 1996)
- Inconsistency in Roman Epic: Studies in Catullus, Lucretius, Vergil, Ovid and Lucan (Cambridge University Press, 2007)
