= Richard Gaskin =

British philosopher (born 1960)

- Born: Richard Maxwell Gaskin; 8 May 1960 (age 66); Glasgow, Scotland, United Kingdom

Academic background
- Education: University College, Oxford
- Thesis: Experience, Agency, and the Self (1988)
- Doctoral advisor: Michael Dummett
- Other advisor: John McDowell
- Influences: Aristotle; Gottlob Frege; John McDowell; Ludwig Wittgenstein; Bertrand Russell

Academic work
- Discipline: Philosophy
- Sub-discipline: History of philosophy; logic; metaphysics; philosophy of language; philosophy of literature
- School or tradition: Analytic philosophy
- Institutions: St Edmund Hall, Oxford; University of Sussex; University of Liverpool

Richard Maxwell Gaskin (born 8 May 1960) is a British philosopher who is a professor at the University of Liverpool. He has published on metaphysics, philosophy of language and logic, and history of philosophy, as well as on philosophy of literature, literary theory, and the European literary tradition. Gaskin received his Bachelor of Arts, Bachelor of Philosophy, and Doctor of Philosophy degrees in classics and philosophy at University College, Oxford, and has held academic posts at St Edmund Hall, Oxford, as well as at the University of Sussex.

Gaskin is the author of many published articles and nine books, including: Language and World: A Defence of Linguistic Idealism (2020), Tragedy and Redress in Western Literature: a Philosophical Perspective (2018), Language, Truth, and Literature: a Defence of Literary Humanism (2013), The Unity of the Proposition (2008), Experience and the World's Own Language: a Critique of John McDowell's Empiricism (2006), and The Sea Battle and the Master Argument: Aristotle and Diodorus Cronus on the metaphysics of the future (1995).

== Early life, education, and career ==
Gaskin was born in 1960 in Milngavie, Glasgow, and attended Robert Gordon's College, Aberdeen, where his father, Maxwell Gaskin, held the Jaffrey Chair of Political Economy at the University of Aberdeen. He studied literae humaniores (classics and philosophy) at University College, Oxford, and obtained his BA (first class) in 1982. While an undergraduate at Oxford he was secretary of the Oxford University Dramatic Society from 1981 to 82, and directed a production of Marlowe's Dr Faustus at the Oxford Playhouse in March 1981. He took the BPhil exam in 1986, supervised by John McDowell. In 1987 he won the Gaisford Dissertation Prize in classical literature for his essay Tragedy and Subjectivity in Virgil’s 'Aeneid' . He was awarded the DPhil in 1988 for a thesis supervised by Michael Dummett, David Wiggins, and Barry Stroud, entitled Experience, Agency, and the Self. From 1988 to 1989 Gaskin spent a year as an Alexander von Humboldt visiting fellow at the University of Mainz, Germany, researching decision-making in classical literature under the Virgilian scholar Antonie Wlosok. From 1991 to 2001, he was a Lecturer (from 1997 Reader) in Philosophy at the University of Sussex. In 2001 he became Professor in the Department of Philosophy at the University of Liverpool.

== Philosophical work ==
A central part of Gaskin's work focuses on the doctrine of linguistic idealism, the idea that the world is produced by, and depends on, language. Gaskin argues that the dependence of the world on language is a logical and constitutive one, rather than a temporal one: objects (such as tables and chairs) exist in virtue of, and are constituted as objects by, the existence of sentences about them; language 'makes the world', but not in the sense that there was a time at which it pre-existed the world. Although human language is a purely contingent product of evolution, there is a transcendental sense in which the existence of the world depends on the existence of language—more precisely, on the capacity of language to talk about the world. In Gaskin's view the world is constitutively composed of propositions, which are referents of sentences; these propositions contain the ordinary objects of our discourse. In Language and World (2020), Gaskin develops the theory of linguistic idealism and defends it against several objections. He addresses the problem that some mathematical entities, in particular uncomputable sets of real numbers, cannot be distinguished by language; he does this by developing a ‘split-level' version of linguistic idealism. In his approach all the basic entities of the world can be named in language, and all further entities, even if they cannot be named, can be derived from these basic entities by describable constructive operations. In Tragedy and Redress in Western Literature: A Philosophical Perspective (2018), Gaskin argues that not even the tragic aspects of life (such as pain and suffering) are beyond language, an objection commonly raised against the idea that language is omnicompetent to talk about and describe reality.

In his writings on literature, Gaskin has defended a version of literary humanism, according to which works of imaginative literature have an objective meaning which is fixed at the time of their production and is the same for all readers. In addition to his publications in philosophy of literature, he has written a study of the poets Horace and Housman, essays on Virgil (e.g. On being pessimistic about the end of the 'Aeneid'), Homer (e.g. Do Homeric Heroes make real decisions?), the classicist Richard Bentley, and the essayist Charles Lamb. Gaskin has translated selections from Apollonius of Rhodes's Greek poem Argonautica into English verse. Gaskin has written on ancient and on medieval philosophy, and on Wittgenstein. He maintains a website on which he mounts recordings of English, German, and Latin poetry.

== Publications ==
=== Selected books ===
Othello and the Problem of Knowledge: Reading Shakespeare through Wittgenstein (Routledge 2023)

Language and World: a Defence of Linguistic Idealism (Routledge 2020).

Tragedy and Redress in Western Literature: a Philosophical Perspective (Routledge 2018).

Horace and Housman (Palgrave Macmillan 2013).

Language, Truth, and Literature: a Defence of Literary Humanism (OUP 2013).

The Unity of the Proposition (OUP 2008).

Experience and the World's Own Language: a Critique of John McDowell's Empiricism (Clarendon Press 2006).

The Sea Battle and the Master Argument: Aristotle and Diodorus Cronus on the Metaphysics of the Future (Walter de Gruyter 1995).

=== Selected articles ===
On being pessimistic about the end of the Aeneid, Harvard Studies in Classical Philology 111, 2021, 315–68.

A Defence of the Resemblance Meaning of “What it’s like”, Mind 128, 2019, 673–98. DOI 10.1093/mind/fzx023.

The Identity Theory of Truth, Stanford Encyclopedia of Philosophy, first published May 1, 2015 [updated 2020].

When Logical Atomism met the Theaetetus: Ryle on Naming and Saying, in M. Beaney ed., The Oxford Handbook of the History of Analytic Philosophy (Oxford: OUP, 2013), 851–69. doi:10.1093/oxfordhb/9780199238842.013.0037.

‘Lamb and Horace’, The Charles Lamb Bulletin 158, 2013, 111–25.

Bentley's classicism, Paradise Lost, and the Schema Horatianum, International Journal of the Classical Tradition 17, 2010, 354–65. DOI .

John Wyclif and the Theory of Complexly Signifiables, Vivarium 47, 2009, 74–96. doi:10.1163/156853408X345927.

Do Homeric Heroes make Real Decisions? (revised version of 1990 CQ paper), in D. Cairns ed., Oxford Readings on Homer's Iliad (Oxford: Clarendon, 2001), 147–65. ISBN 978-0-198-72182-6.

Conditionals of Freedom and Middle Knowledge Philosophical Quarterly 43, 1993, 412–30. (Winner of 1992 PQ essay competition.) doi:10.2307/2219983. Reprinted with corrections in E. Dekker et al. eds., Middle Knowledge (Peter Lang, 2000), 137–56, ISBN 978-3-631-36288-4.
