= Susanna Braund =

Professor of Latin poetry

Susanna M. Braund
- Occupations: Professor of Latin Poetry and its Reception

Academic background
- Education: University of Cambridge (BA and PhD)

Academic work
- Discipline: Classics
- Institutions: University of British Columbia

Susanna H. Morton Braund (born 6 February 1957) is a professor of Latin poetry and its reception at the University of British Columbia.

== Education ==
Braund received her BA in Classics from the University of Cambridge in 1978, followed by a PhD in 1984 from the same institution.

== Career ==
Braund held appointments at the University of Exeter, the University of Bristol, Royal Holloway, University of London, Yale University and Stanford University before taking up her current professorship.

Since 2007, Braund has held a Tier 1 Canada Research Chair position in Latin Poetry and its Reception, which was renewed in 2014. Her research is on the translation history of Latin poetry.

Braund was elected as a Scholar in Residence at the Collège de France for June 2014.

In 2016, Braund was awarded a Killam Research Fellowship for the years 2016–2018, for a project on translations of Virgil's Aeneid, Georgics and Eclogues.

In 2018, Braund was elected as Corresponding Fellow to the Australian Academy of the Humanities.

== Selected bibliography ==
=== Translations and editions ===
- Seneca, De Clementia: Edited with Text, Translation and Commentary (Oxford: Oxford University Press 2009) ISBN 978-0-19-960780-8.
- Juvenal and Persius (Loeb Classical Library vol. 91) (Cambridge, MA: Harvard University Press 2004) Parallel text Latin edition and English translation of both authors' works, with an introduction. ISBN 978-0-674-99612-0.
- Juvenal, Satires Book I (Cambridge: Cambridge University Press 1996). Text with an introduction and commentary. ISBN 978-1-316-52980-5.
- Lucan, Civil War: Translated with introduction and notes (Oxford: Oxford University Press 1992) Reissued as part of Oxford World's Classics.

=== Books and edited volumes ===
- Virgil and his Translators, ed. with Zara Martirosova Torlone (Oxford: Oxford University Press 2018), ISBN 978-0-19-881081-0.
- Latin Literature (London and New York: Routledge 2002) ISBN 978-0-415-19518-8. Second edition: Understanding Latin Literature (London and New York: Routledge 2017) ISBN 978-1-138-64539-4).
- The Roman Satirists and their Masks (London: Bristol Classical Press/Duckworth 1996) ISBN 978-1-85399-139-4.
- Satire and Society in Ancient Rome (Exeter Studies in History 23), (Liverpool: Liverpool University Press 1989) ISBN 978-0-85989-331-2.
- Beyond Anger: A Study of Juvenal’s Third Book of Satires (Cambridge: Cambridge University Press 1988) ISBN 978-0-521-35637-4.

=== Podcast appearances ===
- Entitled Opinions: 'Susanna Braund on Virgil's Aeneid'. 25 October 2005.
