= Wendell Clausen =

American classicist (1923–2006)

- Photographed in later life
- Born: Wendell Vernon Clausen; April 2, 1923; Coquille, Oregon
- Died: October 12, 2006 (aged 83); Belmont, Massachusetts
- Spouses: Corinna Slice (m. 1947) Margaret Woodman (m. 1970)

Academic background
- Education: University of Washington (AB); University of Chicago (PhD)
- Thesis: Erchanberti Frisigensis "Tractatus super Donatum" (1948)

Academic work
- Discipline: Classical studies
- Sub-discipline: Greek and Latin literature
- School or tradition: Harvard School
- Institutions: Amherst College; Harvard University

Wendell Vernon Clausen (April 2, 1923 – October 12, 2006) was an American classicist, who specialized in the poetry of Vergil. After undergraduate studies in English and Latin at the University of Washington, he took a PhD in classics from the University of Chicago in 1948, and moved to teach classics at Amherst College in Massachusetts. From 1959 until his retirement in 1993, he taught Greek, Latin, and later comparative literature at Harvard University.

Most of Clausen's publications were in the field of Latin poetry. He was the first American to edit a volume of the Oxford Classical Texts, releasing a 1959 volume in the series of the Roman satirists Persius and Juvenal. The main focus of his work was Vergilian poetry, particularly the pastoral poems known as the Eclogues. Clausen's 1964 article "An Interpretation of the Aeneid" is considered a foundational text of the Harvard School, which interpreted Vergil's Aeneid as containing subtle messages expressing discomfort with the Roman emperor Augustus and his imperialistic ideology.

== Biography ==
Clausen was born on April 2, 1923, in Coquille, Oregon. He was educated at the University of Washington, from which he received his Bachelor of Arts degree with majors in English and Latin in 1945, and at the University of Chicago, which awarded him a PhD in classics in 1948. His doctoral thesis was on the grammatical writings of the ninth-century bishop Erchanbert of Freising.

After taking a post as an instructor in classics at Amherst College in Massachusetts in 1948, Clausen was promoted to associate professor in 1955. In 1959, he moved to Harvard University as a full professor of Greek and Latin, where he remained for the following thirty-four years. He became the Victor S. Thomas Professor of Greek and Latin in 1982, the Pope Professor of Language and Literature in 1988, and a professor of comparative literature (concurrently with his classical posts) in 1984. Between 1966 and 1971, he was chair of the Harvard classics department. He edited the academic journal Harvard Studies in Classical Philology in 1973–1974, 1982, and 1992–1993.

Clausen held a fellowship at the American Academy in Rome for the 1952–1953 academic year, and a fellowship of the American Council of Learned Societies for 1962–1963. In 1963, he was made a fellow of the American Academy of Arts and Sciences. He was a visiting professor at University College London in 1971, and held the 1982 Sather Professorship of Classical Literature at University of California, Berkeley; he delivered his Sather Lectures on "Virgil's Aeneid and the Tradition of Hellenistic Poetry". He was also made a fellow commoner, an honorary appointment, of Peterhouse, Cambridge. His 1959 edition of the Roman satirists Persius and Juvenal was the first volume in the Oxford Classical Texts series to be edited by an American.

Clausen's academic studies chiefly concerned the Roman poet Vergil, and particularly the latter's pastoral poems known as the Eclogues. The Latinist W. R. Johnson identified Clausen as a founding member of the Harvard School, which interpreted Vergil's Aeneid as containing subtle messages expressing discomfort with the Roman emperor Augustus and his imperialistic ideology. The Virgilian scholar Stephen Harrison wrote that Clausen's 1964 article "An Interpretation of the Aeneid" was a foundational text of the movement. In that article, Clausen described the Aeneid as the story of "a long Pyrrhic victory of the human spirit", and wrote that the poem's ending, with "no sense of triumph", shows the Aeneid to be neither a work of propaganda or a "sentimental" poem which resolves its conflicts at the end. In 1994, he was awarded the Premio Internazionale Virgilio ("International Vergilian Prize") by the Accademia Nazionale Virgiliana, an Italian academic institute focused on the study of Vergil.

Clausen retired from Harvard in 1993. A Festschrift in his honor was published in 1998. He was married twice; to Corinna (née Slice), whom he married on August 20, 1947, and to Margaret (née Woodman), whom he married on June 19, 1970. Wendell Clausen suffered a stroke in August 2005, and was in poor health thereafter; he died on October 12, 2006, in Belmont, Massachusetts. Margaret Clausen died on November 6, a few weeks later; they received a joint funeral at Harvard.

== Published works ==
=== As editor ===
- Clausen, Wendell, ed. (1956). A. Persi Flacci Saturarum Liber [The Book of Satires of A. Persius Flaccus] (in Latin). Oxford: Clarendon Press – via Internet Archive.
- Clausen, Wendell, ed. (1959). A. Persi Flacci et D. Iuni Iuvenalis Saturae [The Satires of A. Persius Flaccus and D. Iunius Iuvenalis] (in Latin). Oxford: Clarendon Press.
- Clausen, Wendell; Goodyear, F. R. D.; Kenney, E. J.; Richmond, J. A. (eds.). Appendix Vergiliana. Oxford Classical Texts (in Latin). Oxford University Press. OCLC 1229771771.
- Kenney, E. J.; Clausen, Wendell, eds. (1982). The Cambridge History of Classical Literature. Vol. II: Latin Literature. Cambridge University Press. ISBN 1-139-05488-0.
- Clausen, Wendell; Zetzel, James E. G., eds. (2004). Commentum Cornuti in Persium [Cornutus's Commentary on Persius] (in Latin). Munich and Leipzig: K. G. Saur. ISBN 3-11-096155-5 – via Internet Archive.

=== As author ===
- Clausen, Wendell (1945). "The Scorched Earth Policy, Ancient and Modern". The Classical Journal. 40 (5): 298–299. JSTOR 3292233.
- — (1947). "Bede and the British Pearl". The Classical Journal. 42 (5): 277–281. JSTOR 3292071.
- — (1963). "Sabinus' MS of Persius". Hermes. 91 (2): 252–256.
- — (1964). "On Editing the Ciris". Classical Philology. 59 (2): 90–101. JSTOR 265491.
- — (1964). "The Textual Tradition of the Culex". Harvard Studies in Classical Philology. 68: 119–138. JSTOR 310801.
- — (1964). "An Interpretation of the Aeneid". Harvard Studies in Classical Philology. 68: 139–147. doi:10.2307/310802. JSTOR 310802.
- — (1970). "Catullus and Callimachus". Harvard Studies in Classical Philology. 74: 85–94. JSTOR 311001.
- — (1971). "Duellum". Harvard Studies in Classical Philology. 75: 69–72. JSTOR 311216.
- — (1972). "On the Date of the First Eclogue". Harvard Studies in Classical Philology. 76: 201–205. JSTOR 310985.
- — (1976). "Catulli Veronensis Liber" [The Book of Catullus of Verona]. Classical Philology. 71 (1): 37–43. JSTOR 268516.
- — (1976). "Cynthius". The American Journal of Philology. 97 (3): 245–247. JSTOR 293629.
- — (1976). "Juvenal and Virgil". Harvard Studies in Classical Philology. 80: 181–186. JSTOR 311240.
- — (1976). "Virgil and Parthenius". Harvard Studies in Classical Philology. 80: 179. JSTOR 311239.
- — (1977). "Ariadne's Leave-taking: Catullus 64.116–20". Illinois Classical Studies. 2: 219–223. JSTOR 23061177.
- — (1986). "Cicero and the New Poetry". Harvard Studies in Classical Philology. 90: 159–170. JSTOR 311467.
- — (1987). Virgil's Aeneid and the Tradition of Hellenistic Poetry. Sather Classical Lectures. Berkeley: University of California Press. ISBN 0-520-05791-0.
- — (1988). "Catulliana". In Horsfall, Nicholas (ed.). Vir bonus discendi peritus: Studies in Celebration of Otto Skutch's Eightieth Birthday. Bulletin Supplement (University of London. Institute of Classical Studies). Vol. 51. Institute of Classical Studies, University of London. pp. 73–81. JSTOR 43768533. SBN 900587-55-5.
- — (1991). "Three Notes on Lucretius". The Classical Quarterly. 41 (2): 544–546. JSTOR 638926.
- — (1994). A Commentary on Virgil, Eclogues. Oxford: Clarendon Press. ISBN 0-19-814916-6.
- — (1995). "Appendix". A Companion to the Study of Virgil. By Horsfall, Nicholas. Mnemosyne Supplements. Vol. 151. Leiden: Brill. pp. 313–314. ISBN 90-04-09559-4. ISSN 0169-8958.
- — (2002). Virgil's Aeneid: Decorum, Allusion, and Ideology. Beiträge zur Altertumskunde. Vol. 162. Munich and Leipzig: K. G. Saur. ISBN 978-3-11-096370-0.
