= Frank Goodyear =

British classicist

Francis Richard David Goodyear, FBA (2 February 1936 – 24 July 1987), commonly known as Frank Goodyear, was an English classicist.

== Early life and education ==
Born in Luton on 2 February 1936, he was the son of a tradesman, Francis Goodyear, who later served as mayor of the town. He attended Luton Grammar School where he largely taught himself Latin and Greek, before studying classics as a scholar at St John's College, Cambridge; he placed in the first class in both parts of the classical Tripos, securing the Craven Scholarship, Hallam Prize and the Chancellor's Medal for Classical Learning. He then studied for a PhD under C. O. Brink at Cambridge; it was awarded in 1961.

== Career ==
Goodyear was a research fellow at St John's from 1959 to 1960, when he was elected to a fellowship at Queens' College, Cambridge. His early publications earned him a strong reputation among Latinists. In 1966, he moved to Bedford College, London, aged only 30, to occupy the Hildred Carlile Chair of Latin. He was also dean of the Faculty of Arts from 1971 to 1973 and vice-principal from 1972 to 1973. When the college merged with Royal Holloway College in 1984 owing to financial difficulties, he resigned his chair in protest. He was then appointed to a visiting professorship at the University of the Witwatersrand, which he held until his death following a heart attack on 24 July 1987, having suffered with alcoholism in his last years; he left a widow, (Cynthia) Rosalie (née Attwood), and a son, Richard. Goodyear had been elected a member of the Accademia Nazionale Virgiliana in 1974 and a fellow of the British Academy in 1984. He was an advisory editor of the Cambridge Classical Texts and Commentaries from 1974.

== Bibliography ==
- (ed.) Incerti auctoris Aetna, Edited with an Introduction and Commentary, Cambridge Classical Texts and Commentaries, no. 2 (Cambridge: Cambridge University Press, 1965).
- (ed. with W. V. Clausen, E. J. Kenney and J. A. Richmond), Appendix Virgiliana, Oxford Classical Texts (Oxford: Clarendon Press, 1966).ISBN 9780198146483
- (ed. with James Diggle) Flavii Cresconii Corippi Iohannidos Sev de Bellis Libycis Libri VIII (Cambridge: Cambridge University Press, 1970).
- Tacitus, Greece and Rome, New Surveys in the Classics, no. 4 (Oxford: Clarendon Press, 1970).
- (ed. with James Diggle) The Classical Papers of A. E. Housman, 3 vols. (Cambridge: Cambridge University Press, 1972).ASIN B009ZQT94S
- (ed.) The Annals of Tacitus Books 1–6, Edited with a Commentary, vol. 1: Annals 1.1–54, Cambridge Classical Texts and Commentaries, no. 15 (Cambridge: Cambridge University Press, 1972).ISBN 9780521085847
- (ed.) The Annals of Tacitus Books 1–6, Edited with a Commentary, vol. 2: Annals 1.55–81 and Annals 2, Cambridge Classical Texts and Commentaries, no. 23 (Cambridge: Cambridge University Press, 1981).ISBN 9780521604338
