= Michael C. J. Putnam =

American classicist (1933–2025)

- Born: Michael Courtney Jenkins Putnam; September 20, 1933; Springfield, Massachusetts, U.S.
- Died: August 19, 2025 (aged 91)
- Awards: Arete Award

Academic background
- Education: Harvard University

Academic work
- Discipline: Classical studies
- Sub-discipline: Latin poetry
- School or tradition: Harvard School
- Institutions: Brown University

Michael Courtney Jenkins Putnam (September 20, 1933 – August 19, 2025) was an American classicist specializing in Latin literature, who also studied literature written in other languages. Putnam was particularly influential in his publications concerning Virgil's Aeneid, and considered a founding member of the Harvard School, which interpreted the poem as containing messages of dissent against the emperor Augustus and his imperialistic ideology.

== Life and career ==
Putnam received his B.A., M.A., and Ph.D. from Harvard. After receiving his Ph.D. in 1959 he taught at Smith College for a year. He then moved on to teach at Brown University and served as W. Duncan MacMillan II Professor of Classics and a professor of comparative literature for 48 years before retiring in 2008. At Brown he served several terms as chair of the department of Classics, as a member of the faculty of comparative literature, and on the Committee on Renaissance and Early Modern Studies.

He was awarded the 1963 Rome Prize of the American Academy in Rome and was later a Resident of the academy (1970) and its Mellon Professor in Charge of the Classical School (1989–91). He became a trustee of the academy in 1991, was awarded its Centennial Medal in 2009, and in 2010 was made a life trustee and awarded its Trustees' Medal.

Putnam was elected as a director of the American Philological Association in 1972, and later served in several senior positions of the association, including as its president. He was elected to the American Academy of Arts and Sciences in 1996 and the American Philosophical Society in 1998. He was awarded the Alexander G. MacKay Prize by the Vergilian Society of America in 2009, and served as a trustee of the society between 2013 and 2016. His 1965 book The Poetry of the "Aeneid" was considered a founding text of the Harvard School, which interpreted Virgil's Aeneid as containing messages of dissent against the emperor Augustus and his imperialistic ideology.

Michael Putnam was the son of politician and businessman Roger Putnam. He served as sole trustee of Lowell Observatory from 1967 to 1987. Asteroid 2557 Putnam was named in his and his father’s honor. The official naming citation was published by the Minor Planet Center on 8 April 1982 (M.P.C. 6835). He was also a member, from 1997, of the selections committee of the Fogg Museum of Art at Harvard University, was a trustee of Bay Chamber Concerts in Rockport, Maine, between 1972 and 1988 and between 2010 and 2016.

Putnam died in Maine on August 19, 2025, at the age of 91.

== Publications ==
In addition to a number of articles and reviews, Putnam published the following books:

- The Poetry of the Aeneid (1965)
- Virgil's Pastoral Art: Studies in the Eclogues (1970)
- Tibullus: A Commentary (1973)
- Virgil's Poem of the Earth (1979)
- Essays on Latin Lyric, Elegy, and Epic (1982)
- Artifices of Eternity: Horace's Fourth Book of Odes (1986)
- Virgil's Aeneid: Interpretation and Influence (1995)
- Virgil's Epic Designs: Ekphrasis in the Aeneid (1998)
- Horace's Carmen Saeculare: Ritual Magic and the Poet's Art (2000)
- Poetic Interplay: Catullus and Horace (2006)
- The Vergilian Tradition: The First Fifteen Hundred Years (2010, edited with Joseph Farrell)
- Jacopo Sannazaro: The Latin Poetry (2009)
- The Humanness of Heroes: Studies in the Conclusion of Virgil's Aeneid (2011)
- The Complete Poems of Tibullus: An En Face Bilingual Edition (2012, with Rodney Dennis)
- The Poetic World of Statius' Silvae (2023, with Antony Augoustakis and Carole Newlands)

He translated and edited Maffeo Vegio: Short Epics (2004); Poetic Interplay: Catullus and Horace (2006).
