= Nicholas Horsfall =

British classical scholar (1946–2019)

- Born: 19 September 1946
- Died: 1 January 2019 (aged 72)

Academic background
- Education: Westminster School; Peterhouse, Cambridge; Corpus Christi College, Oxford
- Influences: R. A. B. Mynors; Robin Nisbet; Margaret Hubbard

Academic work
- Discipline: Classics
- Sub-discipline: Latin literature
- Institutions: University College London
- Notable works: Five commentaries on Vergil's Aeneid (2000–2013)

Nicholas Mark Horsfall (19 September 1946 – 1 January 2019) was a British scholar of Latin literature. Educated at Peterhouse, Cambridge, and Corpus Christi College, Oxford, he worked as a lecturer at University College London, but retired in 1987. He was a specialist on the works of the Roman poet Vergil and published five commentaries (2000–2013) on individual books of his Aeneid. This series of commentaries was described by the Latinist James O'Hara as "one of the most remarkably productive and rich periods of publication of any modern classicist".

== Life and career ==
Nicholas Mark Horsfall was born on 19 September 1946. His parents were Thomas and Sophie Mendelssohn-Horsfall. His father was a member of the Royal Navy and a descendant of the philosopher Moses Mendelssohn. Sophie, born Szapiro, came from a Jewish German-Russian background and had fled from Berlin to the United Kingdom in 1939. She worked as an interpreter of Russian for the BBC. Having been educated at Westminster School in London, Horsfall went on to study Classics at Peterhouse, Cambridge. In 1971 he earned a D.Phil. from Corpus Christi College, Oxford, with a dissertation on Book 7 of Vergil's Aeneid. His doctoral work was supervised by the Latinists R. A. B. Mynors, Robin Nisbet, and Margaret Hubbard.

In 1971, Horsfall began working as a lecturer at University College London, where he was influenced by the Latinists Otto Skutsch and George Goold. In 1987, after being diagnosed with multiple sclerosis, he retired from teaching and moved to the Trastevere neighbourhood of Rome. After his return to the United Kingdom in 2000, Horsfall lived first near Oxford and then in Strathconon, a village in the Scottish Highlands. He had a stroke on 25 December 2018 and died 1 January 2019.

== Work ==
Horsfall specialised in the works of the Roman poet Vergil, whose Aeneid was the subject of his University of Oxford doctoral thesis; he published a commentary on Aeneid Book 7 in 2000, followed by Books 11 (2003), 3 (2006), 2 (2008), and 6 (2013) – "one of the most remarkably productive and rich periods of publication of any modern classicist", according to the Latinist James O'Hara, who compared Horsfall to "taxing geniuses in other fields like Ted Williams, Neil Young, or John Ford." At his death he was preparing a commentary on Book 1. He also published three discursive books on Vergil: Virgilio: l'epopea in alambicco (1991, in Italian), A Companion to the Study of Virgil (1995, as the editor), and The Epic Distilled: Studies in the Composition of the Aeneid (2016). A selection of his papers was printed in 2020 by Oxford University Press: Fifty years at the Sibyl's Heels. Selected Papers on Virgil and Rome (ed. A. Crofts).

== Bibliography ==
- O'Hara, James (2019). "Nicholas Horsfall, 1946–2019". Vergilius. 65: 161–168. JSTOR 26857431.
- Telegraph Obituaries (14 February 2019). "Nicholas Horsfall". The Daily Telegraph.
