= Stephen Harrison (classicist) =

British classical philologist

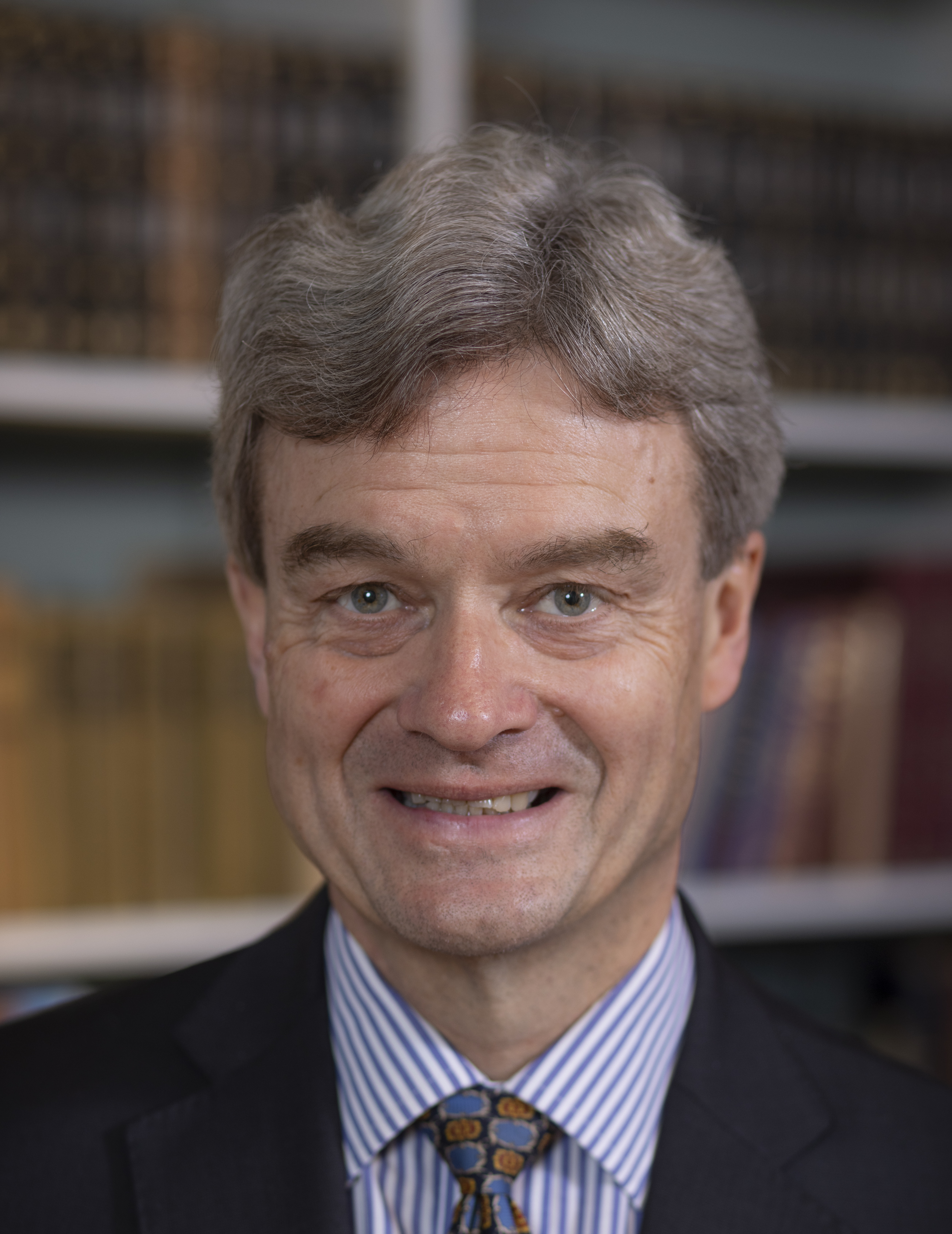
- Born: 31 October 1960 (age 65)

Academic background
- Education: Balliol College, Oxford
- Thesis: A Commentary on Vergil, Aeneid 10 (1987)
- Doctoral advisor: R. G. M. Nisbet

Academic work
- Discipline: Classics
- Institutions: Corpus Christi College, Oxford
- Main interests: Horace; Vergil

Stephen Harrison (born 31 October 1960) is a British classicist and a professor of Latin at the University of Oxford. He has published widely on the poetry of Virgil and Horace.

== Life and career ==
Having read Classics at Balliol College, Harrison has taught Latin literature at the University of Oxford since 1987. In addition, he has been an occasional visiting professor at the universities of Copenhagen and Trondheim. While his research focuses on the poetry of Virgil and Horace, he has also written on the reception of classical literature and the Roman novel. He is a fellow of Corpus Christi College, Oxford.

In 2022 he was bestowed an honorary doctorate from the Norwegian University of Science and Technology.

== Selected publications ==
- Apuleius : A Latin Sophist, Oxford University Press, 2000.
- A Companion to Latin Literature, ed. Blackwell, 2005.
- Framing the Ass: Literary Form in Apuleius Metamorphoses, Oxford University Press 2013.
- Horace: Odes 2, Cambridge University Press, 2017.
