= Adam Parry =

American classicist (1928–1971)

- Born: February 1, 1928; Paris, France
- Died: June 6, 1971 (aged 43); Near Colmar, France
- Citizenship: American
- Spouses: Barbara Pfeiffer (m. 1948, divorced) Anne Reinberg Amory (m. 1966, died)
- Children: 3
- Relatives: Milman Parry (father)

Academic background
- Education: University of California, Berkeley; Harvard University
- Thesis: "Logos" and "Ergon" in Thucydides (1957)
- Doctoral advisor: Eric Havelock
- Influences: Ivan Mortimer Linforth; Cedric Whitman

Academic work
- Discipline: Classics
- Sub-discipline: Virgilian studies
- School or tradition: Harvard School
- Institutions: Amherst College; Harvard University; Yale University
- Influenced: Robert Angus Brooks; Wendell Clausen; Oliver Lyne

Adam Milman Parry (February 1, 1928 – June 6, 1971) was an American classical scholar. He worked on Greek and Latin history literature, particularly the works of Thucydides, Homer and Virgil, and was a founding figure of the scholarly movement that became known as the Harvard School of criticism into Virgil's Aeneid.

The son of the Homeric scholar Milman Parry, Parry spent much of his early life in California following his father's early death in 1935. He subsequently studied at the University of California, Berkeley, at Harvard University and on a Fulbright Scholarship at the Sorbonne in Paris. While writing up his Harvard doctoral thesis, he took a post at Amherst College in Massachusetts, and moved between short-lived appointments at Harvard, Amherst, Yale University and University College London before settling at Yale in 1962. He was appointed full professor and department chair there in 1968, and remained at the university until his death.

Parry's work encompassed translations, critical annotations, historiography and literary criticism. His 1963 article "The Two Voices of Virgil's Aeneid" is regarded as a founding text of the Harvard School, an interpretative trend arguing that Virgil's poem contains a "private voice" drawing attention to the costs and horrors of Roman imperialism and the rule of the emperor Augustus. He opposed the Vietnam War and was known for his left-wing politics and bohemian lifestyle. He died in a motorcycle accident on June 6, 1971, alongside his second wife, Anne. In the following decades, his interpretation of the Aeneid became a dominant influence upon Virgilian scholarship.

== Life ==
Adam Milman Parry was born on February 1, 1928, (Note: For Parry's full name, see Havelock 1972, p. xi. For his date of birth, see The New York Times, June 11, 1971) near Paris. He was the son of Marian Parry (née Thanhouser) and the classicist Milman Parry, who was at the time studying at the Sorbonne in the city. His mother came from a wealthy Jewish family in Milwaukee. In 1929, the elder Parry was appointed to a post at Harvard University in Cambridge, Massachusetts. The family first moved there, and subsequently accompanied Milman's expeditions to southern Yugoslavia, where he carried out fieldwork into traditional Yugoslav epic poems through which he demonstrated that the Homeric poems were works of oral poetry.

Milman Parry died in 1935, of a gunshot wound generally believed to have been self-inflicted and accidental. (Note: On the alternative views that Milman Parry's death was suicide or murder by his wife, see Janko 2021.) Marian Parry moved the family to California. Adam Parry studied under Ivan Mortimer Linforth and Harold F. Cherniss at the University of California, Berkeley, graduating in 1949. During his time there, he worked as a crewman on ships sailing between California and Seattle in Washington. He moved to Harvard University to embark on a Ph.D. programme the following year, now supporting himself by working as a taxi driver in Boston and periodically attending classes in his uniform. His teachers at Harvard included the classicists John Huston Finley Jr. and Cedric Whitman. He spent the 1950–1951 academic year at the Sorbonne in Paris in on a Fulbright Scholarship, and sat the preliminary examinations for his Ph.D. in the spring of 1952; among his examiners for the viva (oral examination) was the intellectual historian Eric Havelock.

Later in 1952, while still writing up his doctoral thesis (titled "Logos" and "Ergon" in Thucydides (Note: The dissertation covered the first two books of Thucydides's History of the Peloponnesian War.) and supervised by Havelock), Parry took a post as an instructor in classics at Amherst College in Massachusetts. At Amherst he was a colleague of the classicists Wendell Clausen, John Moore and Thomas Gould. Along with his then-wife Barbara, he translated in 1954 from French Personal Religion Among the Greeks, a publication of the Sather Classical Lectures delivered at Berkeley in 1952–1953 by André-Jean Festugière. (Note: Havelock 2010, p. xi. On Festugière's lectures, see Dow 2020, p. 65.) He later completed another translation, this time from modern Greek, of a chapter on the Old East Slavic epic poem known as The Tale of Igor's Campaign.

Parry remained at Amherst until 1955, when he moved to Yale University as an instructor on the invitation of Frank Edward Brown. He received his Ph.D. from Harvard in 1957. This was followed by a Morse fellowship at Yale, and a year as a research associate at University College London, during which he made several visiting lectures at other universities in England. In 1960, by now an assistant professor at Yale, he moved to a post at the same level at Harvard. While there, he directed a performance of the Ajax, a tragedy by the fifth-century Athenian playwright Sophocles, in Ancient Greek: Parry played Ajax himself, with the younger of his two sons also in the cast. At the end of his first academic year at Harvard, he accepted a tenured post at Amherst, beginning there in 1961. That year, he wrote the notes for Robert Fagles's translation of the poems of the early Greek lyric poet Bacchylides. In 1962, he returned to Yale; in 1968, he was a made a full professor and chair of the classics department. In 1971, he published The Making of Homeric Verse, a collected volume of his father's academic works. (Note: Kirk 1972, p. 428. The volume is Parry 1971.)

Parry died, along with his wife Anne, in a motorcycle accident near Colmar in France on June 6, 1971. The couple had recently bought the motorcycle and were using it to travel back to France from Germany. Shortly before his death, his term as chair of the Yale classics department had been extended for a fourth year. He had also been contracted by Oxford University Press to write a book, The Mind of Thucydides, expanding his doctoral dissertation, and by Cambridge University Press to serve as an editor for the Cambridge History of Classical Literature.

== Assessment and legacy ==
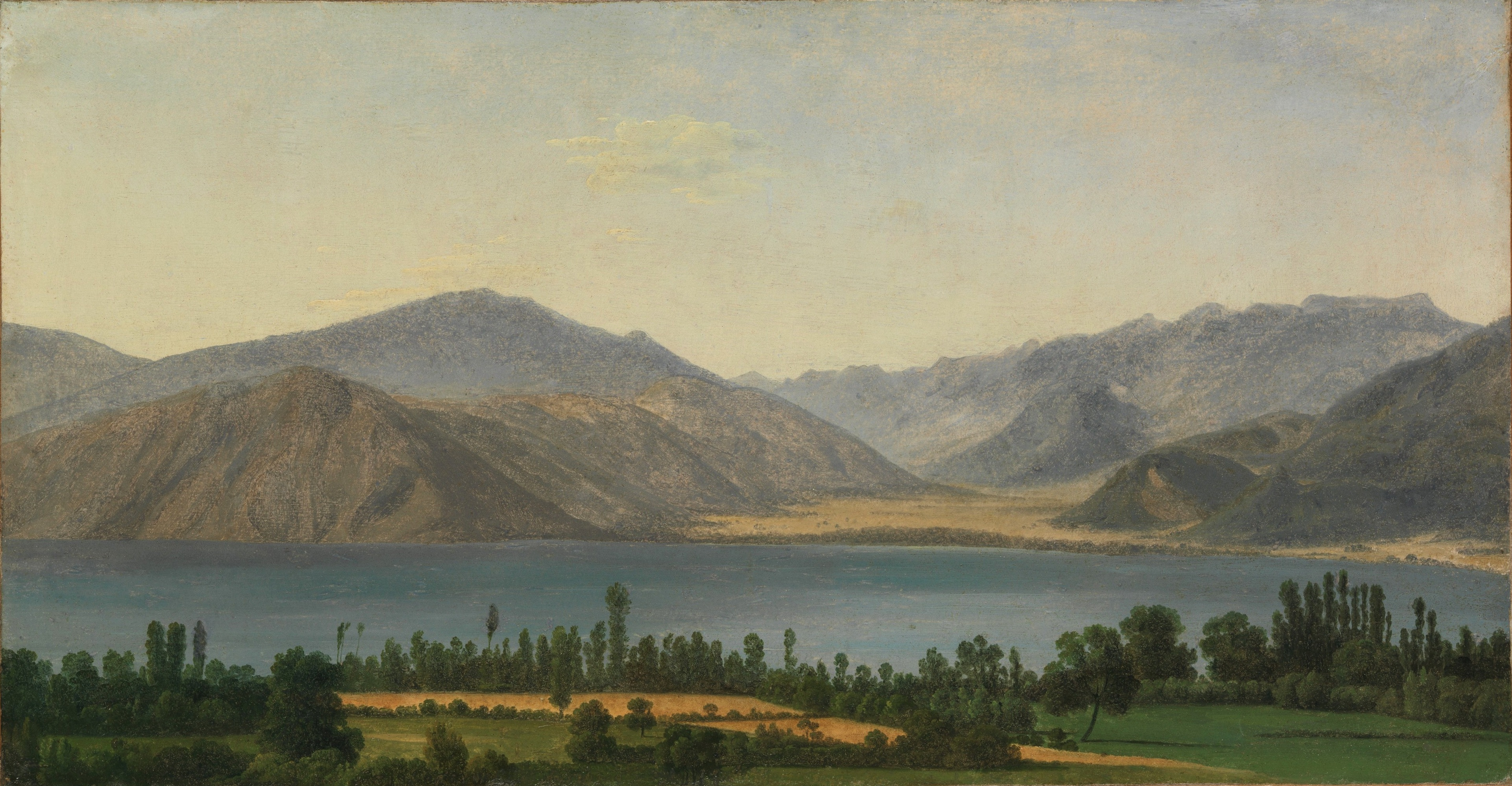
An eighteenth-century painting of Lake Fucino in Italy by Jean-Joseph-Xavier Bidauld. Parry's "Two Voices" article opens with a discussion of a passage of the Aeneid in which the lake mourns for the fallen hero Umbro.

Four days after his death, the professors of Greek at the universities of Cambridge, Oxford and Bristol – Denys Page, Hugh Lloyd-Jones and Geoffrey Kirk – co-signed a letter in The Times calling Parry one of the best Greek scholars of his generation. A posthumous Festschrift in his honor was published as a volume of Yale Classical Studies in 1975, edited by the historian Donald Kagan. (Note: Westlake 1977, p. 219. The Festschrift is Kagan 2010.) His collected papers were published as The Language of Achilles and Other Papers by Lloyd-Jones in 1989.

Parry's 1956 article, "The Language of Achilles", was described by Peter Rose as the most radical challenge to Milman Parry's thesis that Homeric poetry saw no friction between an idea and the language available to express it. In 1973, Michael Reeve described it as one of the most important works on Homer in the preceding half century: Lloyd-Jones considered it Parry's most important contribution to scholarship. In 1975, Havelock wrote that it remained a widely cited work on its topic, and noted that Kirk had selected it for his 1964 edited collection, The Language and Background of Homer. (Note: Havelock 2010, p. xiv. Kirk's edited volume is Kirk 1964.)

=== Influence on the Harvard School ===
Parry was a leading figure in the Harvard School, (Note: The name "Harvard School" was coined by Johnson in 1976; Clausen maintained that the movement's true origin was at Amherst in the 1950s, where he and Parry had been colleagues.) sometimes known as the "Harvard Pessimists", which questioned the then-orthodox view of Virgil's Aeneid as propaganda for the emperor Augustus. In 1963, he published "The Two Voices of Virgil's Aeneid" in the literary journal Arion, arguing that the poem contained what he called "a private voice of regret" alongside its "public voice of triumph", and used this private voice to emphasize the costs and flaws of Augustus and of Roman imperialism. This essay is regarded as a foundational text of the Harvard School's mode of reading the Aeneid as a poem which challenges Augustan ideology. Other prominent Harvard School writers included W. Ralph Johnson, Wendell Clausen, Michael Putnam, Oliver Lyne, and Robert Angus Brooks. (Note: Cox 2019, p. 469. For Brooks, see Zetzel 2017, p. 126. For Lyne, see Burrow 2019, p. 119.)

Richard Jenkyns, in 2017, described "The Two Voices of Virgil's Aeneid" as "practical criticism at its best" and praised both its eloquence and its clarity. The article has frequently been cited as a major influence on Virgilian scholarship. In 1989, Richard F. Moorton called it "one of the most influential essays on the Aeneid ever written". In 2000, Stephanie Quinn called it one of the most influential of the previous thirty-five years. In 2006, Brian Breed cited it as a text of "great influence", particularly on Oliver Lyne's 1987 Further Voices in Virgil's "Aeneid"; a 2017 retrospective on the Harvard School by Julia Hejduk called it "seminal". In 2018, Susanna Braund wrote that "if there is one single scholarly intervention that shifted our view of the Aeneid, it was surely Adam Parry's essay". In 2017, Ward W. Briggs referred to the dominant paradigm of Virgilian studies in the generations after Parry's article as "a kind of Parryitis".

== Personal life ==
Timothy Dwight College at Yale, where Parry was a fellow

Parry variously went by "Adam" and "Milman" as his first name. He married Barbara Pfeiffer on October 22, 1948. Lloyd-Jones recounted a story that Adam and Barbara Parry had been the inspiration for the 1962 novel Love and Friendship by Alison Lurie. Lurie's characters are the parents of children who burn down two college houses, and Lloyd-Jones wrote of being told that this detail had been based on the Parries. Adam and Barbara had three children, and later divorced. (Note: Beye 2018; for Pfeiffer, see The New Haven Register, July 7, 2018.) Parry married Anne Reinberg Amory, a visiting lecturer at Yale and previously his contemporary as a Ph.D. student at Harvard, in April 1966.

Parry became a trade union member during his time working at sea, and known to have strongly left-wing politics. In 1967, he wrote a letter to the Yale Daily News condemning the decision of Yale's Timothy Dwight College, of which he was a fellow, to invite Ronald Reagan, then a candidate for the Republican presidential nomination. Parry described Reagan as "one of the most savage proponents of American belligerence" in Vietnam.

Lloyd-Jones described Parry as "one of the most delightful and accomplished human beings I have known. Handsome, elegant and witty, he had a most unusual charm, by no means diminished by a streak of bohemian wildness." In a 1975 obituary, Havelock wrote that Parry maintained "a faint flavor of France and French culture" in his personal style. Robert Kanigel describes him as having a sarcastic sense of humor: during a dinner with his paternal aunt Lucile, she opined that she wished she had "peasant blood", to which Parry replied "well, Lucile, what do you think you have?" Lloyd-Jones wrote that Parry had once told him that he had only ever imagined being a classical scholar, a lawyer, or a beachcomber, and that he would never have become the former had he not outlived his father.

== Published works ==
=== As author ===
- Parry, Adam (1956). "The Language of Achilles". Transactions of the American Philological Association. 87: 1–7. doi:10.2307/283867. JSTOR 283867.
- — (1957). "Landscape in Greek Poetry". Yale Classical Studies. 15: 3–29.
- — (1958). "Thucydides 1.11.2". The American Journal of Philology. 79 (3): 283–285. doi:10.2307/292565. JSTOR 292565.
- — (1960). "Sophocles, Oedipus Rex 1271–4". The Classical Quarterly. 10 (2): 268–270. doi:10.1017/S0009838800004031. JSTOR 638058.
- — (1960). "What Can We Do To Homer?". The Fat Abbott. Autumn 1960: 52–59. (Note: A negative review of Robert Graves's 1959 translation of the Iliad.)
- — (1961). "Shakespeare and History". Yale Review. Summer 1961: 603–610.
- — (1962). "Homer: The Odyssey". The Fat Abbott. Winter 1962: 48–57. (Note: A positive review of Robert Fitzgerald's 1961 translation of the Odyssey.)
- — (1963). "The Two Voices of Virgil's Aeneid". Arion: A Journal of the Humanities and the Classics. 2 (4): 66–80. JSTOR 20162871.
- — (1965). "A Note on the Origins of Teleology". Journal of the History of Ideas. 26 (2): 259–262. doi:10.2307/2708231. JSTOR 2708231.
- — (1966). "Have We Homer's Iliad?". Yale Classical Studies. 20 (2): 177–216.
- — (1967). "Classical Philology and Literary Criticism". Ventures. Spring 1967: 30–34.
- — (October 31, 1967). "Reagan's Visit". Yale Daily News. p. 2.
- — (1968). "Herodotus and Thucydides". Arion: A Journal of the Humanities and the Classics. 7 (3): 409–416. JSTOR 20163146.
- — (1969). "The Language of Thucydides's Description of the Plague". Bulletin of the Institute of Classical Studies. 16 (16): 106–118. doi:10.1111/j.2041-5370.1969.tb00667.x. JSTOR 43646392.
- — (1970). "Thucydides's Use of Abstract Language". Yale French Studies. 45: 3–20. doi:10.2307/2929550. JSTOR 2929550.
- — (1972). "The Idea of Art in Virgil's Georgics". Arethusa. 5 (1): 35–52. JSTOR 26307005.
- — (1972). "Language and Characterization in Homer". Harvard Studies in Classical Philology. 76: 1–22. doi:10.2307/310975. JSTOR 310975.
- — (1972). "Thucydides's Historical Perspective". Yale Classical Studies. 22: 47–61.
- — (1981) [1957]. Logos and Ergon in Thucydides. New York: Arno Press. ISBN 0405140452.

=== As editor ===
- Parry, Adam, ed. (1971). The Making of Homeric Verse: The Collected Papers of Milman Parry. Oxford: Oxford University Press. ISBN 0198141815.
- —, ed. (1972). Studies in Fifth Century Thought and Literature. Cambridge: Cambridge University Press. ISBN 0521083052.

== See also ==
- Darkness Visible: A Study of Vergil's Aeneid – a 1976 monograph by W. Ralph Johnson responding, in part, to the views of Parry and the Harvard School.

== Footnotes ==
=== Works cited ===
- "Barbara Parry". The New Haven Register. July 7, 2018.
- Baron, Christopher (2013). "The Mind of Thucydides (First Published 1956). Cornell Studies in Classical Philology". Bryn Mawr Classical Review.
- Beye, Charles R. (June 26, 2018). "Parry, Adam Milman". Database of Classical Scholars. Rutgers–New Brunswick School of Arts and Sciences.
- Braund, Susanna (2018). "Virgil After Vietnam". In Braund, Susanna; Torlone, Zara Martirosova (eds.). Virgil and His Translators. Oxford: Oxford University Press. pp. 107–123. ISBN 9780198810810.
- Breed, Brian W. (2013) [2006]. Pastoral Inscriptions: Reading and Writing Virgil's Eclogues. London: Bloomsbury. ISBN 9780715634493.
- Briggs, Ward W. (2017). "What the Harvard School Has Taught Me". The Classical World. 111 (1): 53–55. doi:10.1353/clw.2017.0065. JSTOR 48553367.
- Burrow, Colin (2019). "Virgil in English Translation". The Cambridge Companion to Virgil. Cambridge: Cambridge University Press. pp. 109–127. doi:10.1017/9781316756102.010. ISBN 9781316756102.
- Clausen, Wendell (1995). "Appendix". In Horsfall, Nicholas (ed.). A Companion to the Study of Virgil. Leiden: Brill. pp. 313–314. doi:10.1163/9789004217591_010. ISBN 9004118705.
- Cox, Fiona (2019). "The Death of Virgil". The Cambridge Companion to Virgil. Cambridge: Cambridge University Press. pp. 461–471. doi:10.1017/9781316756102.029. ISBN 9781316756102.
- Dow, Sterling (2020) [1965]. Fifty Years of Sathers: The Sather Professorship of Classical Literature in the University of California, Berkeley: 1913/4–1963/4. Berkeley: University of California Press. doi:10.1525/9780520329935. ISBN 9780520329935.
- Fagles, Robert (1961). Bacchylides: Complete Poems. New Haven: Yale University Press. OCLC 43734560.
- Harrison, Stephen (2007) [1990]. "Some Views of the Aeneid in the Twentieth Century". In Harrison, Stephen (ed.). Oxford Readings in Virgil's Aeneid. Oxford: Oxford University Press. pp. 1–20. ISBN 9780198143888.
- Harrison, Stephen (2017). "A Voyage Around the "Harvard School"". The Classical World. 111 (1): 76–79. doi:10.1353/clw.2017.0071. JSTOR 48553373.
- Havelock, Eric A. (1972). "Adam Milman Parry". Studies in Fifth-Century Thought and Literature. Cambridge: Cambridge University Press. p. xi. ISBN 0521083052.
- Havelock, Eric A. (2010) [1975]. "In Memoriam Adam and Anne Parry, Ob. June 1971". Studies in the Greek Historians. Cambridge: Cambridge University Press. pp. ix–xv. doi:10.1017/CBO9780511933769. ISBN 9780511933769.
- Hejduk, Julia D. (2017). "Introduction: Reading Civil War". The Classical World. 111 (1): 1–5. doi:10.1353/clw.2017.0061. JSTOR 48553363.
- Hewitt, Anne (2003). Between God and Beast: An Examination of the Ethical and Political Ideas of the Poet, Pindar; the Historian, Thucydides; and the Philosopher, Aristotle (PDF) (Ph.D. thesis). University of London.
- Janko, Richard (November 27, 2021). "Review: Hearing Homer's Song: The Brief Life and Big Idea of Milman Parry". Bryn Mawr Classical Review.
- Jenkyns, Richard (2017). "The Conversation of Gentlemen". The Classical World. 111 (1): 79–83. doi:10.1353/clw.2017.0072. JSTOR 48553374.
- Kagan, Donald, ed. (2010) [1975]. Studies in the Greek Historians. Cambridge: Cambridge University Press. doi:10.1017/CBO9780511933769. ISBN 9780511933769.
- Kanigel, Robert (2021). Hearing Homer's Song: The Brief Life and Big Idea of Milman Parry. New York: Alfred A. Knopf. ISBN 9780525520955.
- Kirk, Geoffrey (1964). The Language and Background of Homer: Some Recent Studies and Controversies. Cambridge: W. Heffer. OCLC 745523.
- Kirk, Geoffrey (1972). "Adam Parry and Anne Amory Parry". Gnomon. 44 (4): 426–428. JSTOR 27685505.
- Lloyd-Jones, Hugh (1989a). "Foreword". In Lloyd-Jones, Hugh (ed.). The Language of Achilles and Other Papers. Oxford: Oxford University Press. pp. v–xi. ISBN 9780198148920. OCLC 1150068883 – via Internet Archive.
- Lloyd-Jones, Hugh, ed. (1989b). The Language of Achilles and Other Papers. Oxford: Oxford University Press. ISBN 9780198148920. OCLC 1150068883 – via Internet Archive.
- Martindale, Charles (2019). "Introduction". The Cambridge Companion to Virgil. Cambridge: Cambridge University Press. pp. 1–20. doi:10.1017/9781316756102.003. ISBN 9781316756102.
- Moorton, Richard F. (1989). "The Innocence of Italy in Virgil's Aeneid". The American Journal of Philology. 110 (1): 105–130. doi:10.2307/294956. JSTOR 294956.
- "Prof. Adam M. Parry and Wife, Classicists, Are Killed in Crash". The New York Times. June 11, 1971. p. 38.
- Quinn, Stephanie (2000). Why Vergil? A Collection of Interpretations. Wauconda: Bolchazy-Carducci Publishers. ISBN 0865164185.
- Reece, Steve (2019). "The Myth of Milman Parry: Ajax or Elpenor?". Oral Tradition. 33 (1): 115–142.
- Reeve, Michael D. (1973). "The Language of Achilles". Classical Quarterly. 23 (2): 193–195. doi:10.1017/S000983880003665X. JSTOR 638171.
- Rose, Peter (1995). Sons of the Gods, Children of Earth: Ideology and Literary Form in Ancient Greece. New York: Cornell University Press. ISBN 9781501737695. JSTOR 10.7591/j.ctvn1tbcw.
- Stallings, A. E. (April 13, 2021). "Swimming the River of Song". The American Scholar.
- Westlake, Henry D. (1977). "Review: In Memory of Milman Parry". The Classical Review. 27 (2): 219–221. doi:10.1017/S0009840X00223913. JSTOR 712916.
- Zetzel, James (2017). "The "Harvard School": A Historical Note by an Alumnus". The Classical World. 111 (1): 125–128. doi:10.1353/clw.2017.0086. JSTOR 48553388.
