= Denys Page =

British classical scholar and academic (1908–1978)

- Born: 11 May 1908; Reading, Berkshire, England
- Died: 6 July 1978 (aged 70); Tarset, Northumberland, England
- Spouse: Katharine Elizabeth Dohan (m. 1938)
- Awards: Kenyon Medal (1969)

Academic background
- Education: Christ Church, Oxford
- Influences: John Beazley; John Dewar Denniston; Edgar Lobel; Ludwig Radermacher

Academic work
- Discipline: Classics
- Sub-discipline: Ancient Greek literature Textual Criticism
- Institutions: Christ Church, Oxford; Trinity College, Cambridge; Jesus College, Cambridge
- Notable works: Poetae Melici Graeci (1962)
- Influenced: James Diggle; Patricia Elizabeth Easterling; Geoffrey Kirk; Hugh Lloyd-Jones; Spencer Barrett; Chris Carey; Alexander F. Garvie

Sir Denys Lionel Page FBA (11 May 1908 – 6 July 1978) was a British classicist and textual critic who served as the 34th Regius Professor of Greek at the University of Cambridge and the 35th Master of Jesus College, Cambridge. He is best known for his critical editions of the Ancient Greek lyric poets and tragedians.

Coming from a middle-class family in Reading, Page studied classics at Christ Church, Oxford, and served the college as a lecturer for most of the 1930s. He spent the Second World War working on Ultra intelligence material at the Government Code and Cypher School based at Bletchley Park. In 1950, he was elected Regius Chair of Greek at Cambridge which he held until his retirement in 1973. Initially a fellow of Trinity College, Cambridge, Page was appointed master of the university's Jesus College in 1959. He died of lung cancer in 1978.

Having published an edition of the poets Sappho and Alcaeus with fellow Oxford classicist Edgar Lobel, Page went on to write what became for some time the standard edition of the remaining Greek lyric poets, Poetae Melici Graeci (PMG, 1962). His other notable publications include commentaries on Euripides' Medea (1938) and Aeschylus' Agamemnon (1957). In 1971, he was knighted for his services to classical scholarship.

== Early life and education ==
Denys Lionel Page was born on 11 May 1908 in Reading, Berkshire, to Frederick Page, a railway engineer at the Great Western Railway and his wife Elsie. He spent part of his childhood in South Wales but returned to Berkshire and became a student at Newbury Grammar School.

In 1926, he won a scholarship to study classics at Christ Church, Oxford. Although Page came from a modest background compared to most of his peers, he settled in well at the college and made a number of friends, including the future Lord Chancellor Quintin Hogg and the Labour politician Patrick Gordon Walker. Among his tutors at Oxford, the archaeologist John Beazley and the Hellenist John Dewar Denniston exerted the greatest influence on his future work. He graduated with a Bachelor of Arts in 1930 and was awarded a Derby Scholarship. The award enabled him to spend a year at the University of Vienna with the German philologist Ludwig Radermacher.

== Career ==
=== Lecturer at Christ Church, Oxford (1931–1939) ===
In 1931, Page was appointed a lecturer at Christ Church and became a Student (a full member of the college's governing body) the following year. It was during this period that he began working on the plays of the Greek poet Euripides, which culminated in the publication of a critical edition and commentary of Euripides' Medea (1938). Following in the footsteps of fellow Oxford classicist Edgar Lobel, he also worked on the poems of the archaic Greek lyric poets.

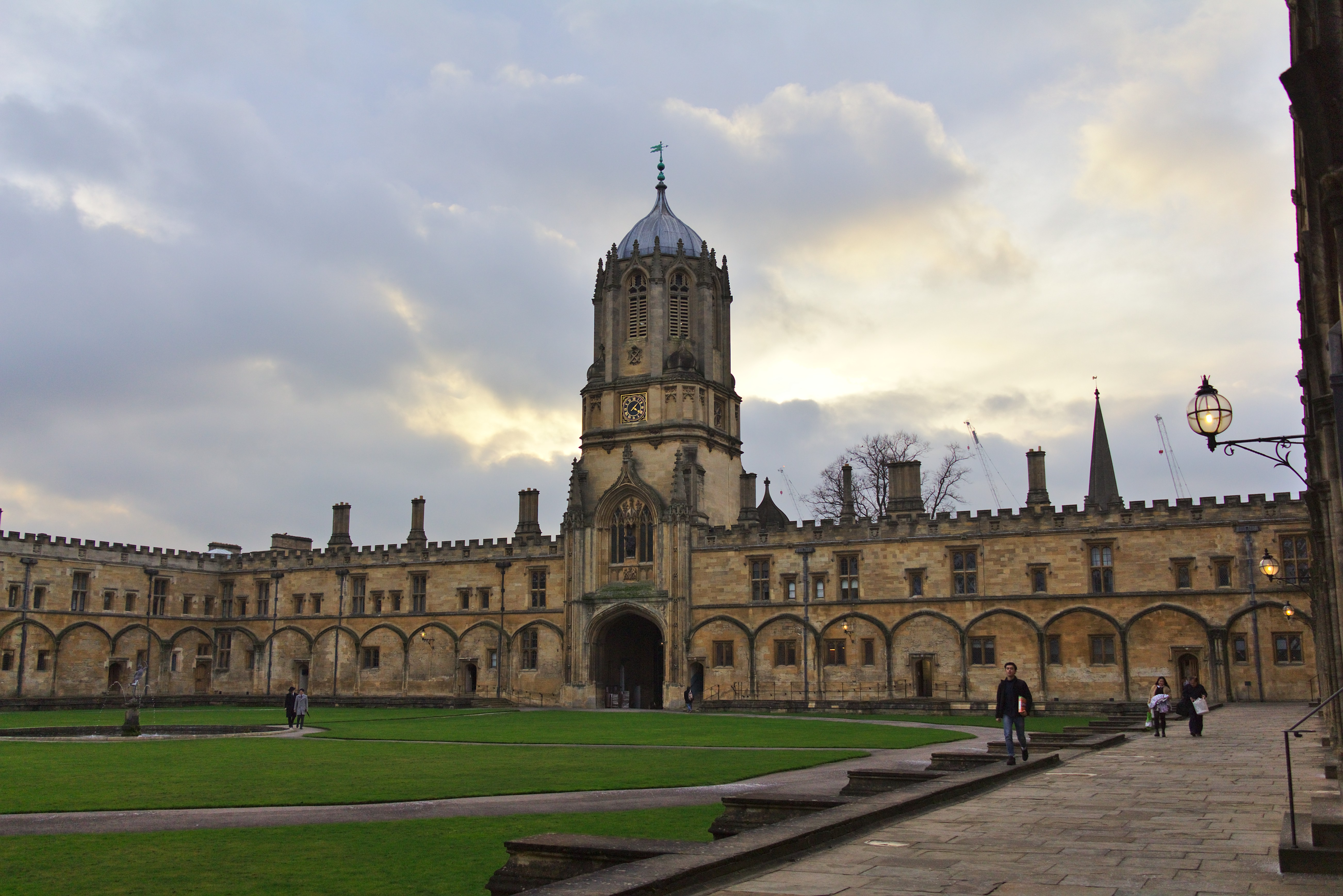
Christ Church at the University of Oxford, where Page spent his early career

Page assumed an active role in college affairs. In 1936, he strongly opposed the candidacy of the Irish scholar E. R. Dodds for the Regius Chair of Greek which was hosted at Christ Church. Dodds was elected to the position in spite of Page's reservations. In 1937 he was appointed to the office of junior censor at the college – the Censor Naturalis Philosophiae, responsible for undergraduate discipline. However, he resigned the position a year later to marry Katharine Elizabeth Dohan, daughter of the American archaeologist Edith Hall Dohan. They had four daughters, one of whom is the Assyriologist Stephanie Dalley. In 1939, he briefly served as the inaugural Andrew Fleming West Professor in Classics at Princeton University.

=== Wartime service at Bletchley Park (1939–1945) ===
In 1939, Page was recruited to the Government Code and Cypher School and posted to Bletchley Park. Page's command of German, acquired during his time at Vienna, was put to use in the interpretation activities of Hut 9A. In 1942 he joined the ISOS "illicit signals" section run by Oliver Strachey and later headed that unit. In this role, he joined the inter-services XX Committee, and became a Deputy Director of GC&CS. After the end of World War II in Europe, he was part of a mission to the British headquarters in Colombo, then Singapore and finally Sri Lanka near the end of the war.

=== Cambridge (1950–1973) ===
After the end of the war, Page returned to Oxford from 1946 and was elected to the office of Senior Proctor (1948). Page's tenure at Oxford came to an abrupt end in 1950: the Regius Chair of Greek at Cambridge University had become vacant after the retirement of Donald Struan Robertson. Though he did not submit an application, Page was offered the post by the electors and accepted. He was duly elected a fellow of Trinity College. At this time, Cambridge provided a less stimulating environment for scholars of the classics than Oxford. Page's arrival, together with that of the German Latinist Charles Brink, marked a reinvigoration of classical teaching at the university.

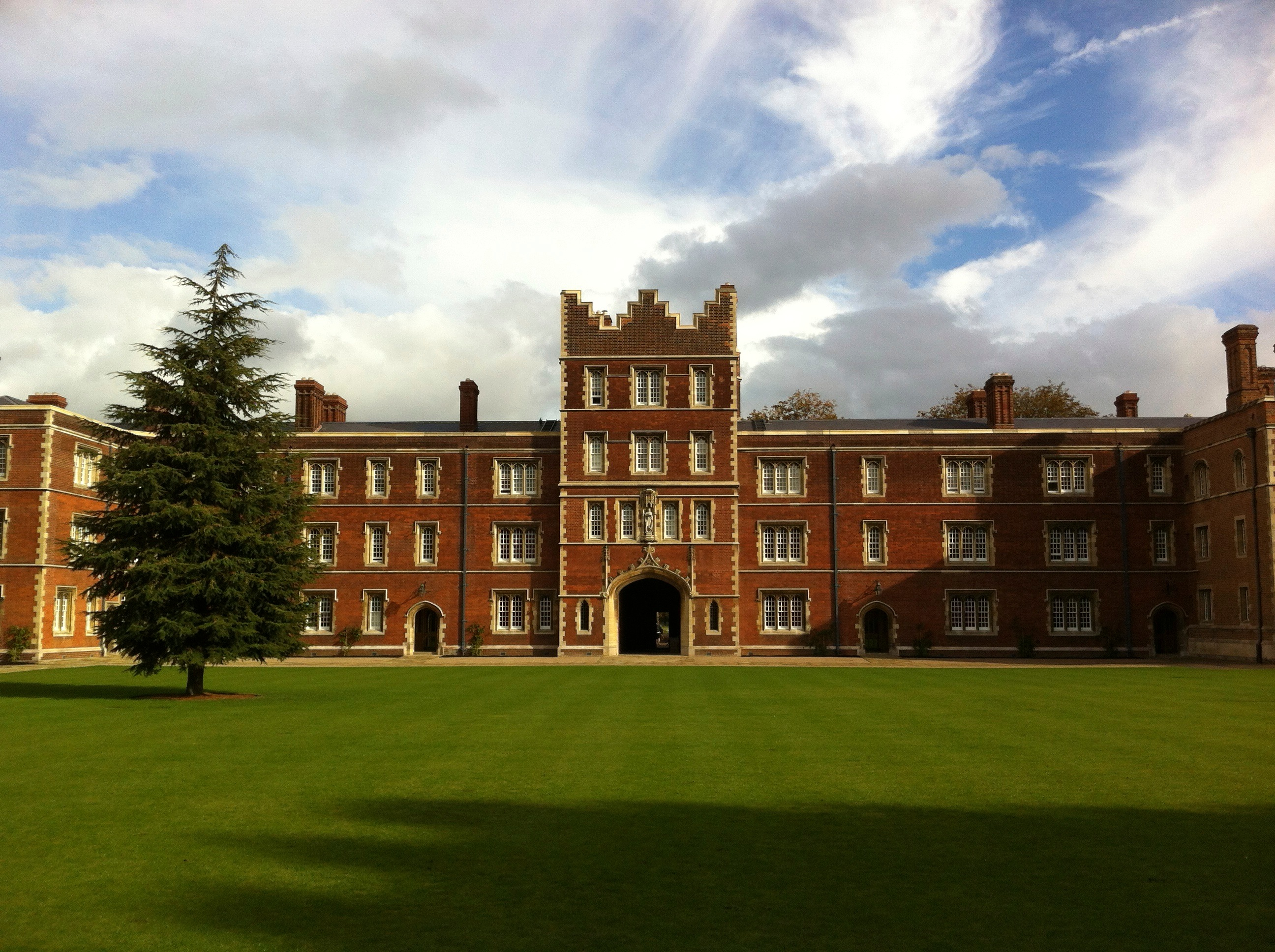
Page served as the master of Jesus College, Cambridge, (pictured) from 1959 to 1973

Similarly to his time at Oxford, Page actively participated in the running of the university. Having been elected to the council of Trinity College soon after his arrival, he was chosen to replace classicist E. M. W. Tillyard as the Master of Jesus College in 1959. He held this position until his retirement in 1973. Many contemporaries considered Page suitable for the position of vice-chancellor, but he was never elected. According to classicist Hugh Lloyd-Jones, his failure to obtain the office was a consequence of his staunch opposition to the students involved in the Garden House riot, a violent protest against the Greek military junta. Having played as a bowler while at Christ Church, Page also served as the president of Cambridge University Cricket Club from 1971 to 1973.

His tenure at Cambridge saw the publication of a number of books on Greek poetry. In 1955, Lobel and Page published a critical edition of the poems of the Lesbian poets Alcaeus and Sappho, followed by a book on the same authors (Sappho and Alcaeus). He was also the sole author of studies on Homer's Odyssey (The Homeric Odyssey, 1955) and the Iliad (History and the Homeric Iliad, 1959). His most comprehensive work, an edition of all lyric poets apart from the Lesbians, appeared in 1962 under the title of Poetae Melici Graeci. Resuming his earlier work on the tragedian Euripides, he took over from the recently deceased Denniston an edition of Aeschylus' Agamemnon, which was published in 1957 as a rival to Eduard Fraenkel's edition of the play.

== Retirement and death ==
Although Page had not reached the age of 67, the customary retirement age for his position, he stepped down from his university and college duties in 1973 after his wife's health deteriorated. The couple led a quiet life in Northumberland where he continued his research, drawing on the library of the University of Newcastle. In 1978, he was diagnosed with lung cancer and died on 6 July of the same year. He was survived by his wife Katharine.

== Legacy ==
Page's reputation as a scholar rested chiefly on his work as an editor of Greek poetic texts. He has been described by Lloyd-Jones as the most accomplished scholar amongst his contemporaries in this field, rivalled only by Edgar Lobel. His complete critical edition of the Greek Lyric poets (Poetae Melici Graeci) is consulted as the standard edition of their texts and was praised for its "philological and critical judgement, and masterly knowledge of dialects" by classicist G. M. Kirkwood in a 1964 review. Although his work on tragedy has not garnered the same admiration from fellow classicists, Page's edition of Euripides' Medea was considered "indispensable" by a reviewer for the Journal of Hellenic Studies. In 1978, his contributions to the study of Greek poetry were honoured by the publication of Dionysiaca: nine studies in Greek poetry by former pupils, presented to Sir Denys Page on his seventieth birthday, edited by a group of leading Hellenists.

An accomplished textual critic, Page was not among the leading literary critics of his generation. His focus lay narrowly on philological questions and, according to Lloyd-Jones, he sometimes exhibited a tendency towards dogmatism when dealing with literary matters. His 1955 book The Homeric Odyssey, in the view of contemporary reviewer J. A. Davison, suffers from these weaknesses and is among his most poorly received publications.

== Honours ==
Page was elected a fellow of the British Academy in 1952 and was awarded the institution's Kenyon Medal in 1969. He later served as the academy's president from 1971 to 1974. He was also a corresponding member of the Academy of Athens, the American Academy of Arts and Sciences, the American Philosophical Society, and the Greek Humanistic Society. He was granted honorary fellowships by Trinity College, Cambridge, Jesus College, Cambridge, and Christ Church, Oxford. He held honorary degrees from the universities of Cambridge (1960), Oxford (1972), Dublin, Newcastle, Hull, and Bristol. He was knighted in 1971.

== Selected publications ==
- Euripides (1938). Page, D. L. (ed.). Medea. Oxford. ASIN B003Q0BYVU.
- Page, D. L. (1953). Corinna. London. ISBN 978-0-902984-03-5.
- Lobel, E.; Page, D. L., eds. (1955). Poetarum Lesbiorum fragmenta. Oxford. ISBN 978-0-19-814137-2.
- Page, D. L. (1955). Sappho and Alcaeus; introduction to the study of ancient Lesbian poetry. Oxford. ISBN 978-0-19-814323-9.
- Page, D. L. (1955). The Homeric Odyssey. Oxford. ASIN B0006AUC02.
- Aeschylus (1957). Denniston, J. D.; Page, D. L. (eds.). Agamemnon. Oxford. ISBN 978-0-19-814102-0.
- Page, D. L. (1959). History and the Homeric Iliad. Berkeley. ISBN 978-0-520-00983-7.
- Page, D. L., ed. (1963). Poetae Melici Graeci. Oxford. ISBN 978-0-19-814333-8.
- Aeschylus (1972). Page, D. L. (ed.). Aeschyli Septem quae supersunt Tragoediae. Oxford. ISBN 978-0-19-814570-7.

== Works cited ==
- Davison, J. A. (1956). "Quot Professores, tot Odysseae?". The Classical Review. 6 (3/4): 207–11. doi:10.1017/S0009840X00162043. JSTOR 702776. S2CID 246874307.
- Davison, J. A. (1957). "Sappho and Alcaeus – Edgar Lobel and Denys Page: Poetarum Lesbiorum Fragmenta" (PDF). The Classical Review. 7: 19–23. doi:10.1017/S0009840X00163012. S2CID 152733992. (subscription required)
- Jocelyn, H. D. (1997). "Charles Oscar Brink 1907–1994" (PDF). Proceedings of the British Academy. 94: 319–54. Archived from the original (PDF) on 17 May 2021.
- Kirkwood, G. M. (1964). "Poetae Melici Graeci by D. L. Page". Phoenix. 18: 329–32. doi:10.2307/1086367. JSTOR 1086367.
- Lloyd-Jones, Hugh (2004). "Page, Sir Denys Lionel (1908–1978)". In Cannadine, David (ed.). Oxford Dictionary of National Biography. Oxford. doi:10.1093/ref:odnb/31523. ISBN 978-0-19-861412-8. (subscription required)
- Lloyd-Jones, Hugh (1981). "Denys Lionel Page". Proceedings of the British Academy. 65: 759–69.
- Montanari, Franco, ed. (2003). "Denys Lionel Page". Catalogus Philologorum Classicorum. Genoa.
- Phillips, E. D. (1939). "Euripides Medea". Journal of Hellenic Studies. 59: 173–4. doi:10.2307/626976. JSTOR 626976. S2CID 163322312. (subscription required)
- Winnington-Ingram, R.P. (1959). "The Agamemnon". The Classical Review. 9: 23–6. doi:10.1017/S0009840X00168829. S2CID 162749678. (subscription required)

Academic offices
New title	Andrew Fleming West Chair in Classics Princeton University; 1938 to 1939	Succeeded by Ivan Mortimer Linforth
Preceded by Donald Struan Robertson	Regius Professor of Greek Cambridge University; 1950 to 1973	Succeeded by Geoffrey Kirk
Preceded by E. M. W. Tillyard	Master of Jesus College, Cambridge; 1959 to 1973	Succeeded by Alan Cottrell
