= Eduard Fraenkel =

German classical scholar (1888–1970)

Eduard Fraenkel FBA
- Born: Eduard David Mortier Fraenkel; 17 March 1888; Berlin, Prussia, German Empire
- Died: 5 February 1970 (aged 81); Oxford, England
- Spouse: Ruth von Velsen (m. 1918)
- Children: 5, including Edward
- Relatives: Hugo Heimann (uncle); Ernst Fraenkel (cousin); Ludwig Traube (granduncle)
- Awards: Kenyon Medal (1965)

Academic background
- Education: Askanisches Gymnasium; University of Berlin; University of Göttingen
- Thesis: De media et nova comoedia quaestiones selectae (1912)
- Doctoral advisor: Friedrich Leo
- Influences: Otto Gruppe; Ulrich von Wilamowitz-Moellendorff; Friedrich Leo; Jacob Wackernagel

Academic work
- Discipline: Classics
- Institutions: University of Kiel; University of Göttingen; University of Freiburg; University of Oxford
- Notable works: Plautinisches im Plautus (1922); Aeschylus, Agamemnon (1950); Horace (1957)

Eduard David Mortier Fraenkel FBA (17 March 1888 – 5 February 1970) was a German classical scholar who served as the Corpus Christi Professor of Latin at the University of Oxford from 1935 until 1953. Born to a family of assimilated Jews in the German Empire, he studied classics at the universities of Berlin and Göttingen. In 1934, antisemitic legislation introduced by the Nazi Party forced him to seek refuge in the United Kingdom where he eventually settled at Corpus Christi College.

Fraenkel established his academic reputation with the publication of a monograph on the Roman comedian Plautus, Plautinisches im Plautus ('Plautine Elements in Plautus', 1922). The book was developed from his doctoral thesis and changed the study of Roman comedy by asserting that Plautus was a more innovative playwright than previously thought. In 1950, he published a three-volume commentary on the Agamemnon by the Greek playwright Aeschylus which has been described by the classicist H. J. Rose as "perhaps the most erudite that any Greek play has ever had". He wrote a monograph, entitled Horace (1957), on the Roman poet Horace after retiring from his teaching post.

Biographers place particular emphasis on the impact of Fraenkel's teaching at Oxford, where he led a weekly seminar on classical texts. A feature of European academic life that had been rare at the university, these classes influenced the intellectual development of many Oxford undergraduates. His seminars on the Agamemnon were the subject of a poem by the novelist and philosopher Iris Murdoch. In 2018, following a petition by the student body, Corpus Christi decided to rename a room in the college that had been named after Fraenkel in reaction to allegations of sexual harassment against him. Summarising Fraenkel's contributions to the discipline, the Hellenist Hugh Lloyd-Jones described him as "one of the most learned classical scholars of his time" due to his acquaintance with a diverse range of disciplines within the Classics.

== Early life and education ==
Eduard David Mortier Fraenkel was born on 17 March 1888 in Berlin, in the Kingdom of Prussia. His family were Jewish but had assimilated and prospered economically. His mother Edith was the sister of Hugo Heimann, a Social Democratic politician and publisher of law books who helped Fraenkel develop an interest in the history of law. His father, Julius Fraenkel, worked as a wine merchant. Through him, Fraenkel was related to two philologists: his cousin Ernst Fraenkel was a scholar of the Baltic languages, and his father's uncle Ludwig Traube was one of the founders of the discipline of palaeography. When he was around ten, Fraenkel contracted osteomyelitis. The life-threatening illness left his right arm deformed.

From 1897 to 1906 Fraenkel attended the Askanisches Gymnasium in the borough of Berlin-Tempelhof, where his teachers included the mythographer Otto Gruppe, whom Fraenkel credited in his doctoral thesis with inspiring his interest in classical antiquity. In spite of these leanings, he enrolled at the University of Berlin to study law, as antisemitic hiring conventions would have made it difficult to obtain a teaching position at a German university. During his time as a student of law, Fraenkel began to be mentored by the Hellenist Ulrich von Wilamowitz-Moellendorff, whose lectures he attended in his own time. After a visit to Rome in late 1907, Fraenkel formally changed his degree subject to classical philology. In 1909, he transferred to the University of Göttingen to continue his studies under the Latinist Friedrich Leo and the linguist Jacob Wackernagel. In 1912, he was awarded a doctorate for a thesis on Roman comedy entitled De media et nova comoedia quaestiones selectae ('Selected Studies on Middle and New Comedy').

== Career in Germany ==
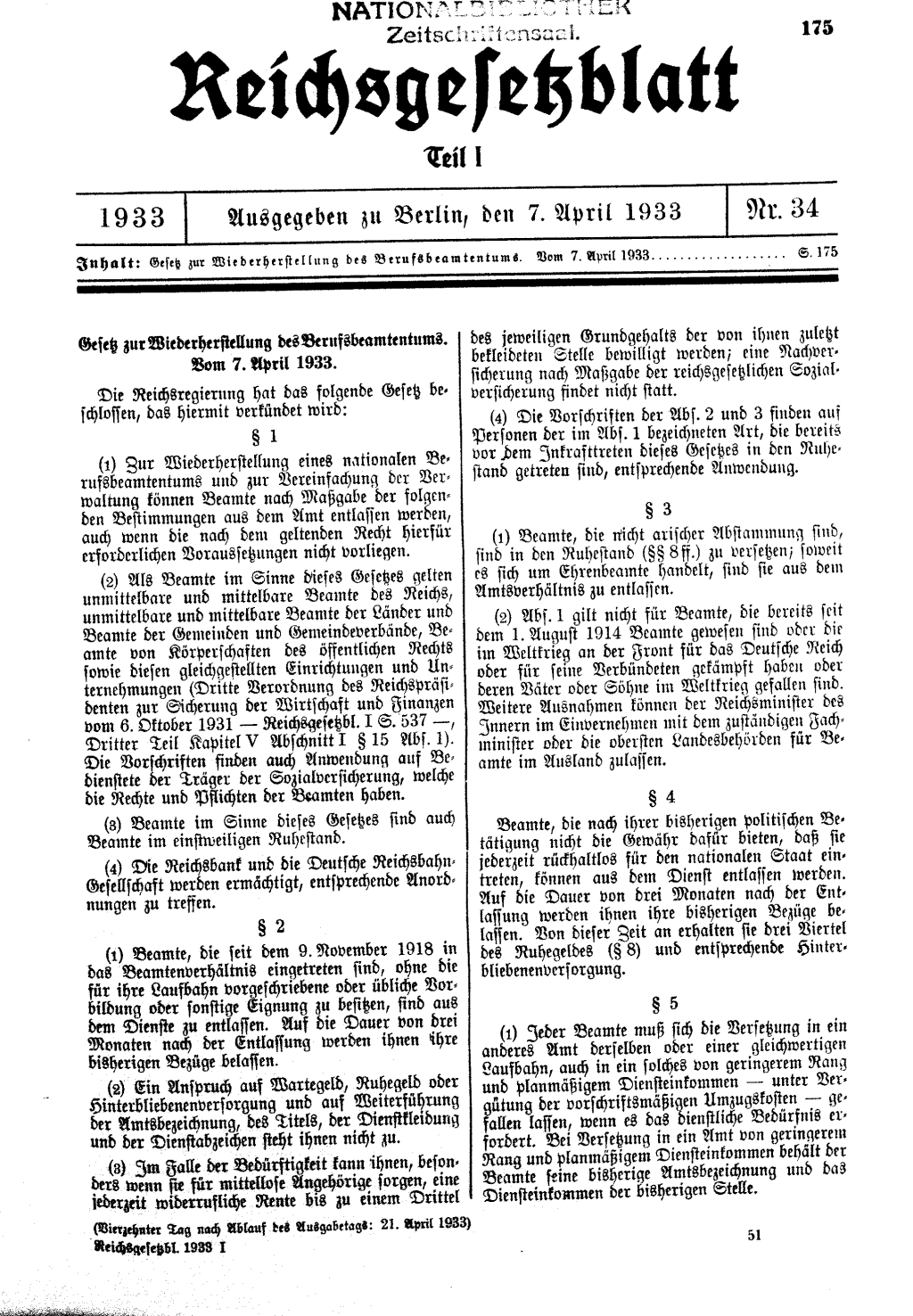
In 1933, the Law for the Restoration of the Professional Civil Service removed Fraenkel from his academic post.

Fraenkel's first academic appointment was in 1913 as an assistant at the Thesaurus Linguae Latinae, a lexicographical project based in Munich. After briefly working at a secondary school in Berlin-Charlottenburg, he began the process of habilitation in 1917 at the University of Berlin and began to teach there as an untenured lecturer, known in German as Privatdozent. In 1918, Fraenkel married Ruth von Velsen, a classical scholar who gave up her career to support him. They had three sons and two daughters, one of whom was the mathematician Edward Fraenkel. Having been promoted to an extraordinary professorship at Berlin in 1920, Fraenkel was appointed a full professor of Latin at the University of Kiel in 1923. His appointment followed the publication of a monograph on the Roman comedian Plautus which established his reputation in the discipline.

In 1928, Fraenkel accepted an offer to return to the University of Göttingen. His three-year stint there was a difficult period for him and his family; his son Albert died from an illness and Fraenkel was subject to antisemitism in the context of what the classicist Gordon Williams described as "personal quarrels" within the faculty. In 1931, he was appointed to a professorship at the University of Freiburg, where he experienced a fulfilling personal life and hoped to settle permanently. However, his tenure at the university was interrupted in early 1933, after Adolf Hitler and the Nazi Party had come to power. In April of that year, a Law for the Restoration of the Professional Civil Service was passed, prohibiting Jews from teaching at universities. Having lost his post, he remained in Germany for the remainder of the year and faced increasing discrimination.

== Exile in England ==
Fraenkel spent part of 1934 at Christ Church College of the University of Oxford, having been invited by the faculty of Classics and the classical scholar Gilbert Murray. In August, after the faculty at Oxford could not extend Fraenkel's stay, he was elected to a Bevan Fellowship at Trinity College, Cambridge. Helped by his friend—the Latinist Donald Robertson—Fraenkel and his family moved to Cambridge later that year.

When it proved difficult to sustain his family with his position at Trinity, Fraenkel began planning a lecture tour through the United States for late 1934, by which he hoped to find a permanent appointment. Before he could embark on the tour, the Corpus Christi Professorship of Latin at Oxford became vacant after the resignation of Albert Curtis Clark. Fraenkel applied for the chair with the support of many British classicists including the future Vice-Chancellor of the university Maurice Bowra, and A. E. Housman, the Kennedy Professor of Latin at Cambridge. His candidacy was opposed by novelist and M.P. John Buchan who protested in The Sunday Times the "importation of foreigners" to British universities. Fraenkel was elected to the chair in 1935 and cancelled his commitments in the United States.

Upon his election, Fraenkel became a fellow of Corpus Christi College and moved into a house on Museum Road. In addition to lectures on Latin poetry, including on the works of Catullus, Horace, and Vergil, he also taught seminars on both Greek and Latin texts. Attended by students and academics, these seminars were a feature of European academic life that was rare at Oxford before Fraenkel's arrival. During term time, participants met once a week to conduct "a slow and detailed examination", reading and discussing the text at a pace of under 10 lines per hour. Individual students were asked to prepare on specific passages with Fraenkel commenting on their work and challenging them on points of interest including interpretation, textual criticism, and the history of classical scholarship. From autumn term 1936 to spring term 1942, the seminars covered the Agamemnon by the Greek playwright Aeschylus, on which Fraenkel published a three-volume commentary in 1950.

== Retirement and death ==
In 1953, Fraenkel retired from his academic appointment, but kept giving lectures and leading seminars. In around 1955, he met the Italian cleric Giuseppe De Luca, who directed a scholarly publishing house, Edizioni di Storia e Letteratura. Working with De Luca, he re-edited Leo's Kleine Schriften and two studies by the German philologist Wilhelm Schulze, Orthographica and Graeca Latina. In 1957, Fraenkel published a monograph on Horace. While Fraenkel remained active long into his retirement, Ruth's health began to deteriorate. She died on 5 February 1970; Fraenkel killed himself on the same day, four hours later.

== Contributions to classical scholarship ==
=== Plautus ===
In the late 19th century, study of the comedies of Plautus was dominated by the idea that his plays were largely derived from examples of Greek middle comedy, most of which have been lost. Scholars treated Plautus's plays chiefly as a means of retrieving information about this lost Greek genre. Fraenkel's mentor, Friedrich Leo, took this line of argumentation in his 1885 study Plautinische Forschungen. In 1922, Fraenkel published a monograph entitled Plautinisches im Plautus ('Plautine Elements in Plautus'), founded upon his doctoral work conducted under Leo. The book was designed to analyse Plautus as an author in his own right and not as a source for middle comedy.

Fraenkel's approach to this problem was to isolate recurring details and forms of expression as a basis for the reconstruction of Plautus's original contribution to the genre of comedy. Using this method, he identified four elements which he deemed characteristic of Plautus: the opening formulae of direct speeches; his characters' habit to intimate their own transformation into someone else; his use of Greek mythology; and his treatment of inanimate objects as animate. Building on these observations, he went on to delineate the main areas of the genre where he considered Plautus to have innovated. These include the length of direct speech, the character of the "crafty slave", and his creative use of sung interventions (cantica). He concluded that, contrary to the predominant academic consensus, Plautus was an "innovative creator in his own right". In 1960, an Italian translation of Plautinisches im Plautus was published, which gave Fraenkel the opportunity to add a list of amendments to his original argument.

Writing for Classical Philology, the classicist Henry Prescott considered Fraenkel's book the most important contribution to the study of Roman comedy since Leo's Plautinische Forschungen. Although Prescott described its conclusions as an "important swing of the pendulum" towards recognising Plautus's originality, he regarded Fraenkel's identification of typical elements as the more successful part of the argument. In 2007, the Hellenist C. W. Marshall stated that the book was "insightful, thought-provoking and at times very frustrating", adding that Fraenkel's judgement of previous scholarship had "stood the test of time". The classicist Lisa Maurice wrote that, even though some of its arguments had been rejected, Plautinisches im Plautus was "the catalyst for modern Plautine scholarship".

=== Aeschylus ===
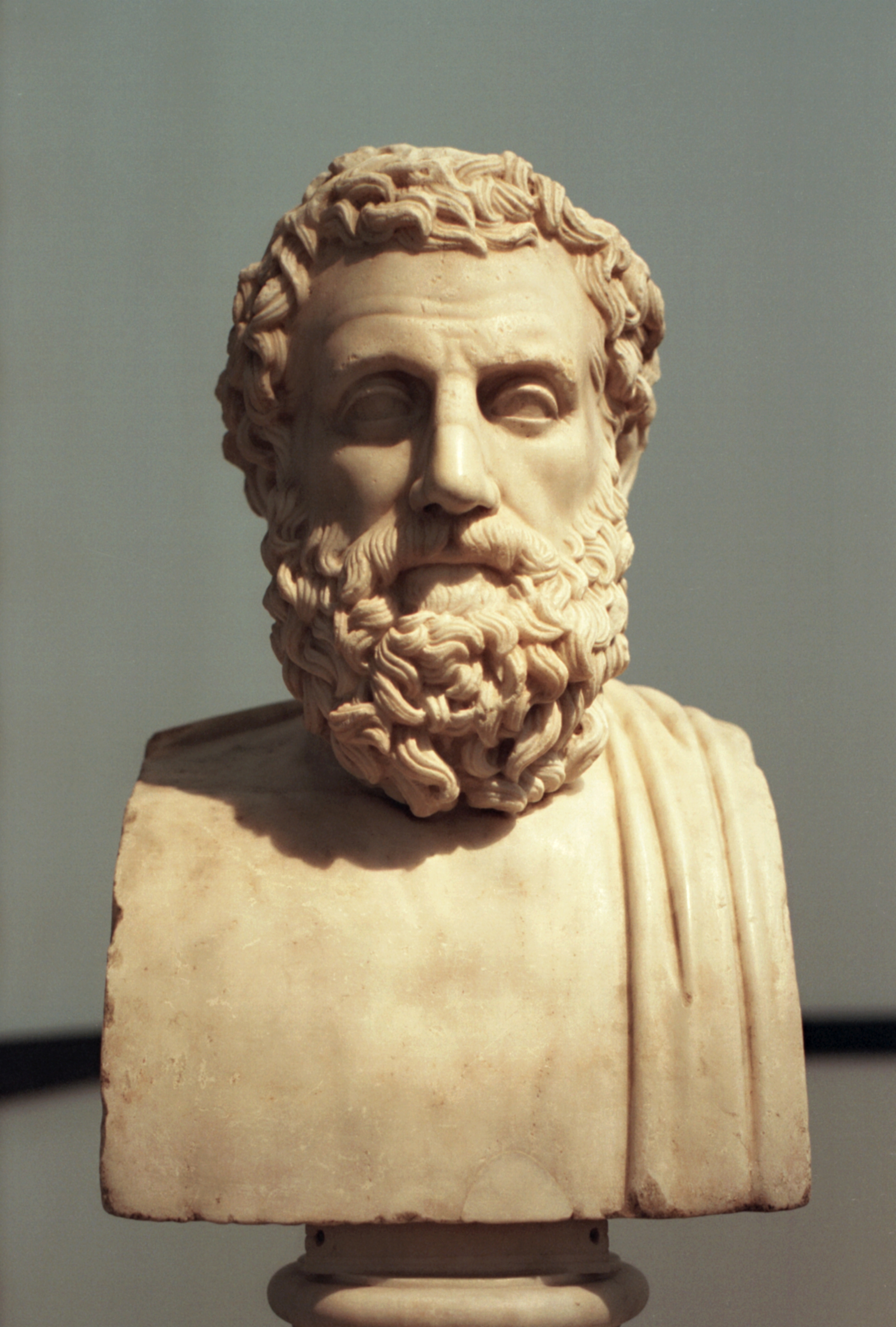
Fraenkel wrote a commentary on the Agamemnon of Aeschylus. This likeness of the playwright is a Roman copy of a Greek original from the 4th century BC.

Fraenkel had begun to show interest in the Agamemnon of Aeschylus as early as 1925 but focused on Latin literature in the years leading up to his application for the Corpus Professorship. He developed his thoughts on the play in his weekly seminars held from 1936 to 1942. From March 1942, a group of friends around the Latinist R. A. B. Mynors and the historian John Beazley began to support Fraenkel in the process of preparing his notes for publication. Parts of his work, including a translation of the Greek text, had to be translated from German into English. In 1943, Fraenkel submitted a manuscript for a commentary on the play to Oxford University Press. Although Kenneth Sisam, the responsible delegate of the press, took a favourable view of it, the publication process was held up due to concerns about the manuscript's exceptional length, leading Sisam to describe the commentary as "a Teutonic monster". The book was published in 1950 in three volumes.

In his commentary, Fraenkel followed the method of the variorum, whereby substantial space is given to the views of previous scholars beside those of the primary author. In a remarkable piece of detection, he showed that many of the most penetrating notes in the highly influential early edition of the text (1663) by Thomas Stanley owed much to the anonymous generosity of John Pearson. In Fraenkel's view, the presentation of existing approaches, though laborious, was necessary to separate the text from the scholarly views that had accrued over time. Contrary to common practice, his book did not deal with overarching themes in a separate introduction but covered them in the commentary whenever they appeared. His individual notes thus became sources of information on many areas of scholarship beyond the play itself. Fraenkel also showed an interest in commentary technique, coining new critical terms, such as guttatim for Aeschylus's use of cumulative apposition.

For the classicist H. J. Rose, Fraenkel's commentary was "perhaps the most erudite that any Greek play has ever had". Rose commended the book for espousing the practice of a thematic introduction and for its balance in presenting the Fraenkel's own views next to those of his predecessors. Rose concluded his review for The Journal of Hellenic Studies by saying "with confidence that the [commentary's] value is permanent". The reviewer C. Arthur Lynch called the edition a "source of joy and amazement", highlighting Fraenkel's willingness to admit irremediable difficulties in the text. The Hellenist J. C. Kamerbeek disapproved of the commentary's harsh criticism of other classicists but added that it was "a monument of 20th-century philology" ("un monument de la philologie du XXe siècle").

=== Horace ===
Fraenkel began publishing articles on Horace in the early 1930s. His Horace (1957) advanced an overall interpretation of the poet's work based on the analysis of individual texts. The book's preliminary chapter reconstructed the poet's life using the testimony of the Roman biographer Suetonius. The remainder of the book contained complete interpretations of selected poems with an emphasis of Horace's earliest and latest works.

In Fraenkel's chapters on the Epodes and Satires, he argued that Horace had undergone a process of artistic maturation away from the imitation of his literary models (the Greek lyric poet Archilochus and the Roman satirist Gaius Lucilius) towards his own conception of the respective genres. A large central section dealt with the first three books of Odes. He showed how Horace developed the patterns of Greek lyric into an increasingly abstract form of literature. Concerning the poems addressing the emperor Augustus, Fraenkel argued that they did not contradict the political stances of Horace's youth, contradicting the views of the historian Ronald Syme. In The Roman Revolution, Syme depicted these poems as a form of propaganda for the Augustan regime.

The book took an innovative view on Horace's Epistles, a collection of letters in dactylic metre; although most previous scholars had regarded them as either faithful reproductions of real-world letters or entirely fictitious, Fraenkel argued that they were of a "double nature", combining real and unreal elements. He interpreted the Carmen Saeculare, a celebratory hymn commissioned for the Secular Games of 17 BC, as a poem independent from its festival context, which marked Horace's return to lyric poetry. Thus, this usually neglected text became an important component in Fraenkel's reading of Horace's work. The final chapter covered the fourth book of Odes, focusing again on the poet's advancement over his models.

Although Horace received largely positive reviews, Fraenkel was disappointed with the reactions from the scholarly community. Having described it as "highly original", Williams wrote that "[the book's] faults too are clear. Fraenkel was inclined to assume a simple relationship between the poet's poetry and his life". He added that Fraenkel's view of Augustus as a "benevolent and reluctant monarch" produced a flawed picture of the relationship of poetry and politics. Reviewing the work for The Classical Journal, the Latinist Janice Benario stated that the book "might be considered an encyclopedia of Horace, so vast is the material covered", deeming it "indispensable to the teacher of Horace at any level". The Latinist Carl Becker viewed the book as "one of the great accomplishments of Latin philology" ("eine der großen Leistungen der lateinischen Philologie")", but highlighted Fraenkel's concept of poetic maturation in the Epodes and Satires as its weakest argument.

== Reception ==
The Agamemnon Class, 1939

Do you remember
Professor Eduard Fraenkel's endless
Class on the Agamemnon?
Between line eighty three and line a thousand
It seemed to us our innocence
Was lost, our youth laid waste,
The aftermath experienced before,
Focused by dread into a lurid flicker,
A most uncanny composite of sun and rain.
Did we expect the war? What did we fear?
First love's incinerating crippling flame,
Or that it would appear
In public that we could not name
The Aorist of some unfamiliar verb...

— Iris Murdoch

Summarising Fraenkel's contributions to the discipline, the Hellenist Hugh Lloyd-Jones described him as "one of the most learned classical scholars of his time" due to his acquaintance with a diverse range of disciplines within the Classics. According to Williams, Fraenkel's most influential writings were his monograph on Plautus and his many journal articles because they "express the true excitement of intellectual discovery". Williams also highlighted Fraenkel's ability to discern "unexpected connections between unconnected facts". The historian of classical scholarship Christopher Stray views Fraenkel as "one of the greatest classical scholars of the twentieth century."

In 2007, the Hellenist Stephanie West published a book chapter exploring the impact of Fraenkel's arrival at Oxford. Drawing on her own recollection and that of other Oxford classicists, she described his seminars as his most important contribution to classical teaching as the meetings were attended mainly by undergraduates with whom Fraenkel shared his broad knowledge in several areas of the Classics. Acknowledging the influence of these seminars on the intellectual development of many Oxford undergraduates, the Hellenist Martin West wrote: "Here we saw German philology in action; we felt it reverberate through us as he patrolled the room behind our chairs [...] We knew, and could not doubt, that this was what Classical Scholarship was and that it was for us to learn to carry it on." The philosopher and novelist Iris Murdoch, who had been a student at Oxford, composed a poem entitled 'The Agamemnon Class, 1939' which juxtaposed Fraenkel's seminar with the outbreak of the Second World War.

In her 2000 book A Memoir: People and Places, the philosopher Mary Warnock wrote that in 1943 Fraenkel had touched her and another female student, Imogen Wrong, against their will during 'individual evening tutorials' in his office. According to Warnock, Fraenkel apologised for his actions after being confronted in a letter by Jocelyn Toynbee, then a Classics tutor at Newnham College, Cambridge. In 1990, the Latinist Nicholas Horsfall stated that "[Fraenkel] did enjoy, warmly, but most decorously, female beauty". His statement was criticised by the ancient historian Mary Beard, who described it as a probable "defence mechanism" against further dissemination of knowledge of Fraenkel's behaviour.

After Fraenkel's death, Corpus Christi converted part of his office into a commemorative conference room entitled Fraenkel Room. On 26 November 2017, the college's undergraduate student body passed a resolution calling for the room to be renamed and for a portrait of Fraenkel to be removed in response to the allegations of sexual harassment made against him. Their effort was publicised by the student newspaper Cherwell, drawing attention from national publications including the Daily Mail and The Times. On 6 February 2018, a town hall meeting took place between students and the college's classical scholars; the meeting arrived at a proposal to rename the Fraenkel Room to Refugee Scholars Room honouring a number of academics who had taken refuge at Corpus Christi. On 7 March, the college's governing body accepted the proposal. The room was fitted with a commemorative plaque commemorating the historians Paul Vinogradoff and Michael Rostovtzeff, the classicist Rudolf Pfeiffer, and the philosopher Isaiah Berlin alongside Fraenkel.

== Honours ==
Fraenkel was elected a Fellow of the British Academy in 1941. He received the Kenyon Medal for classical studies in 1965 and held honorary doctorates from the Free University of Berlin and the universities of Urbino, St. Andrews, Florence, Fribourg, and Oxford.

== Publications ==
The following books were authored by Fraenkel:

- Plautinisches im Plautus (in German). Berlin: Weidmannsche Buchhandlung. 1922. OCLC 459709688.
- Iktus und Akzent im lateinischen Sprachvers (in German). Berlin: Weidmannsche Buchhandlung. 1928. OCLC 463164298.
- Gedanken zur einer deutschen Vergilfeier (in German). Berlin: Weidmannsche Buchhandlung. 1930. OCLC 932528585.
- Aeschylus, Agamemnon. 3 Volumes. Oxford: Oxford University Press. 1950. OCLC 163433411.
- Horace. Oxford: Clarendon Press. 1957. ISBN 978-0-19-814376-5. OCLC 249873211.
- Kleine Beiträge zur klassischen Philologie. 2 Volumes (in German). Rome: Edizioni di Storia e Letteratura. 1964. OCLC 476392833.

== Bibliography ==
- Becker, Carl (1959). "Review of Horace by Eduard Fraenkel". Gnomon (in German). 31: 592–612. ISSN 0017-1417. JSTOR 27682133.
- Brink, Charles Oscar (1986). English Classical Scholarship. Oxford University Press. ISBN 978-0-227-90001-7.
- Benario, Janice (1958). "Review of Horace by Eduard Fraenkel". The Classical Journal. 54: 42–45. ISSN 0009-8353. JSTOR 3295332.
- Burton, G. R.; Toland, John (2020). "Ludwig Edward Fraenkel. 28 May 1927—27 April 2019". Biographical Memoirs of Fellows of the Royal Society. 69: 175–201. doi:10.1098/rsbm.2020.0014. S2CID 222142828.
- Elsner, Jaś (2021). "Room with a Few: Eduard Fraenkel and the Receptions of Reception". In Harrison, Stephen; Pelling, Christopher (eds.). Classical Scholarship and Its History. Berlin and Boston: De Gruyter. pp. 319–347. doi:10.1515/9783110719215-014. ISBN 978-3-11-071921-5. S2CID 233563903.
- Horsfall, Nicholas (1976). "Eduard Fraenkel: Bibliography". Journal of Roman Studies. 66: 200–205. doi:10.1017/S0075435800073573. ISSN 0075-4358. S2CID 162965386.
- Kamerbeek, J. C. (1952). "Review of Aeschylus, Agamemnon by Eduard Fraenkel". Mnemosyne (in French). 5: 80–82. ISSN 0026-7074. JSTOR 4427347.
- Lloyd-Jones, Hugh (1971). "Eduard Fraenkel". Gnomon. 43 (6): 634–640. ISSN 0017-1417. JSTOR 27685315.
- Lloyd-Jones, Hugh (2004). "Fraenkel, Eduard David Mortier". In Cannadine, David (ed.). Oxford Dictionary of National Biography (online ed.). Oxford: Oxford University Press. doi:10.1093/ref:odnb/33241. (Subscription, Wikipedia Library access or UK public library membership required.)
- Lynch, C. Arthur (1951). "Review of Aeschylus, Agamemnon by Eduard Fraenkel". Classical World. 45: 90. ISSN 0009-8418. ProQuest 1296289510.
- Marshall, C. W. (2007). "Plautinisches im Plautus". The Classical Review. 58: 110–112. doi:10.1017/S0009840X07002065. ISSN 0009-840X. S2CID 161054916.
- Maurice, Lisa (2007). "Review of Plautine Elements in Plautus (Plautinisches im Plautus) by Eduard Fraenkel (translated by Tomas Drevikovsky and Frances Muecke)". Scholia. 16: 138–141. ISSN 1018-9017.
- Mitchell, Leslie (2010). Maurice Bowra: A Life. Oxford University Press. ISBN 978-0-191-61538-2.
- Prescott, Henry (1924). "Review of Plautinisches im Plautus by Eduard Fraenkel". Classical Philology. 19: 90–93. doi:10.1086/360565. ISSN 0009-837X. JSTOR 262822.
- Rose, H. J. (1952). "Review of Aeschylus, Agamemnon by Eduard Fraenkel". Journal of Hellenic Studies. 72: 130–132. doi:10.2307/628017. ISSN 0075-4269. JSTOR 628017.
- Stray, Christopher (2014). "Eduard Fraenkel: An Exploration". Syllecta Classica. 25: 113–72. doi:10.1353/syl.2014.0004. ISSN 2160-5157. S2CID 162757339.
- Stray, Christopher (2016). "A Teutonic Monster in Oxford: The Making of Fraenkel's Agamemnon". In Kraus, Christina; Stray, Christopher (eds.). Classical Commentaries: Explorations in a Scholarly Genre. Oxford: Oxford University Press. pp. 39–57. ISBN 978-0-19-968898-2.
- Stray, Christopher (2017). "Eduard Fraenkel (1888–1970)". In Crawford, Sally; Ulmschneider, Katharina; Elsner, Jaś (eds.). Ark of Civilization: Refugee Scholars and Oxford University, 1930–1945. Oxford: Oxford University Press. pp. 180–197. ISBN 978-0-19-968755-8.
- West, Stephanie (2007). "Eduard Fraenkel Recalled". In Stray, Christopher (ed.). Oxford Classics: Teaching and Learning 1800–2000. London: Bloomsbury Publishing. pp. 200–213. ISBN 978-0-7156-3645-9.
- Williams, Gordon (1972). "Eduard Fraenkel, 1888–1970" (PDF). Proceedings of the British Academy. 56: 415–442. ISSN 0068-1202. Archived from the original (PDF) on 15 April 2022.
- Wilson, Emily (2008). "Ave, Jeeves!". London Review of Books. 30. ISSN 0260-9592.

Academic offices
Preceded by Albert Curtis Clark	Corpus Christi Professor of Latin; University of Oxford; 1935 to 1953	Succeeded by R. A. B. Mynors
