= Annette Harder =

Dutch classical scholar (born 1952)

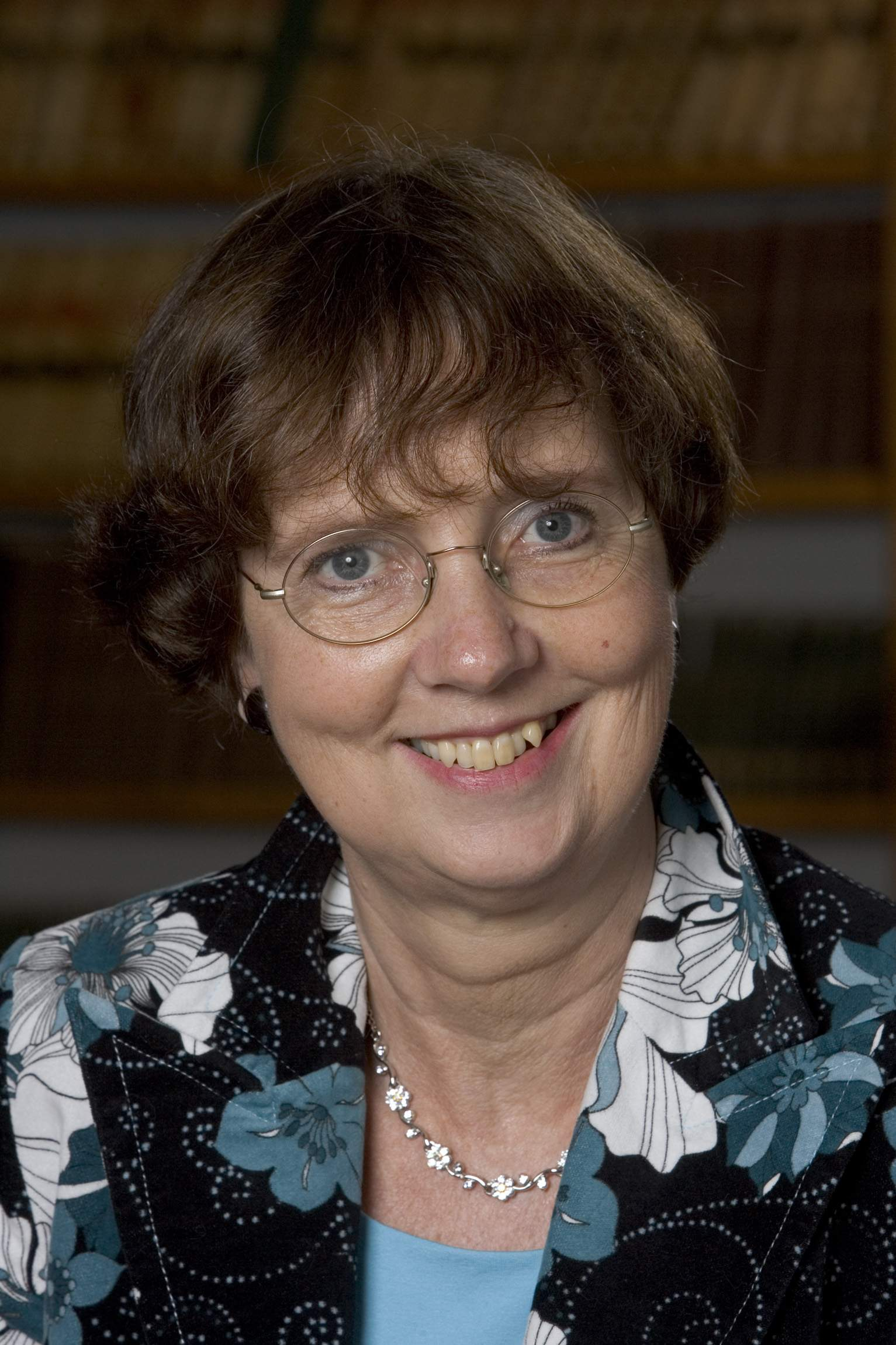
- Harder in 2005
- Born: 1952 (age 73–74)
- Occupations: Professor of Ancient Greek Language and Literature

Academic background
- Education: University of Groningen
- Thesis: Euripides' Kresphontes and Archelaos (1985)
- Doctoral advisor: Stefan Radt and Hugh Lloyd-Jones

Academic work
- Discipline: Classics
- Sub-discipline: Ancient Greek literature
- Notable works: Callimachus: Aetia. Introduction, Text, Translation and Commentary (2012)

Marijke Annette Harder (born 1952) is a Dutch classical scholar, known above all for her work on ancient Greek literature of the Hellenistic period.

== Biography ==
Harder was born in 1952. She was educated at Bogerman College, Sneek, and Menso Alting College, Hoogeveen, before studying at the University of Groningen, passing her doctoraal in 1978. She then spent a year studying papyrology at the University of Oxford with a grant provided by the Philologisch Studiefonds of Utrecht University (1978–1979), and held positions as a researcher at the Thesaurus Linguae Graecae at the University of Hamburg (1980–1981) and as a research assistant and teacher at Utrecht (1981–1986). She obtained her doctorate from the University of Groningen in 1985, with a dissertation titled "Euripides' Kresphontes and Archelaos", supervised by Stefan Radt and Hugh Lloyd-Jones. She then spent a year as a postdoctoral researcher at Groningen (1986–1987), before becoming a lecturer there in 1988 and a professor in 1991.

In 1992, she organised the first Groningen Workshop on Hellenistic Poetry, on the subject of the Hellenistic poet Callimachus. This workshop was then held every two years on a different aspect of Hellenistic poetry, resulting in a collected volume of essays published in the Hellenistica Groningiana series edited by Harder.

In 2005, she was appointed as a member of the Royal Netherlands Academy of Arts and Sciences.

Harder's most substantial work is a major two-volume edition with commentary on the Aetia, the fragmentary magnum opus of the poet Callimachus. Harder began working on this commentary in the 1980s, and worked on it until its final publication in 2012. The work received high praise from reviewers such as James J. Clauss, who described it as an "amazing work" which "will likely itself become a classic".

Harder retired from her Groningen professorship in 2017. The thirteenth Groningen Workshop on Hellenistic Poetry, held in that year, was a celebratory occasion in Harder's honour, and led to the publication of a Festschrift volume within the Hellenistica Groningiana series, titled Callimachus Revisited: New Perspectives in Callimachean Scholarship.

== Selected publications ==
=== Editions of ancient texts ===
- Harder, M. A. (1985). Euripides' Kresphontes and Archelaos. Brill. ISBN 9789004075115.
- Harder, M. A. (2012). Callimachus: Aetia. Introduction, Text, Translation and Commentary. Oxford University Press. ISBN 9780199581016.

=== Edited volumes ===
- Harder, M. A.; Hoffmann, Heinz, eds. (1991). Fragmenta dramatica: Beiträge zur Interpretation der griechischen Tragikerfragmente und ihrer Wirkungsgeschichte. Vandenhoeck und Ruprecht. ISBN 9783525257487.
- Harder, M. A.; Regtuit, R. F.; Wakker, G. C., eds. (1993). Callimachus. Forsten.
- Harder, M. A.; Regtuit, R. F.; Wakker, G. C., eds. (1996). Theocritus. Forsten. ISBN 9780614209785.
- Harder, M. A.; Regtuit, R. F.; Wakker, G. C., eds. (1998). Genre in Hellenistic Poetry. Forsten. ISBN 9789069801186.
- Harder, M. A.; Regtuit, R. F.; Wakker, G. C., eds. (2000). Apollonius Rhodius. Forsten. ISBN 9789042909274.
- Harder, M. A.; Regtuit, R. F.; Wakker, G. C., eds. (2002). Hellenistic Epigrams. Forsten. ISBN 9789042911086.
- Harder, M. A.; Regtuit, R. F.; Wakker, G. C., eds. (2004). Callimachus 2. Peeters. ISBN 9789042914032.
- Harder, M. A.; Nauta, R. R., eds. (2005). Catullus' Poem on Attis: Text and Contexts. Brill. ISBN 9789004141322.
- Harder, M. A.; Cuypers, M. P., eds. (2005). Beginning from Apollo: Studies in Apollonius Rhodius and the Argonautic Tradition. Peeters. ISBN 9789042916296.
- Harder, M. A.; Regtuit, R. F.; Wakker, G. C., eds. (2006). Beyond the Canon. Peeters. ISBN 9789042918139.
- Harder, M. A.; Macdonald, A. A.; Reinink, G. J., eds. (2007). Calliope's Classroom: Studies in Didactic Poetry from Antiquity to the Renaissance. Peeters. ISBN 9789042918085.
- Harder, M. A.; Regtuit, R. F.; Wakker, G. C.; Ambühl, Annemarie, eds. (2009). Nature and Science in Hellenistic Poetry. Peeters. ISBN 9789042921863.
- Harder, M. A.; Regtuit, R. F.; Wakker, G. C., eds. (2012). Gods and Religion in Hellenistic Poetry. Peeters. ISBN 9789042924840.
- Harder, M. A.; Regtuit, R. F.; Wakker, G. C., eds. (2014). Hellenistic Poetry in Context. Peeters. ISBN 9789042929852.
- Harder, M. A.; Regtuit, R. F.; Wakker, G. C., eds. (2017). Past and Present in Hellenistic Poetry. Peeters. ISBN 9789042933217.
- Harder, M. A.; Regtuit, R. F.; Wakker, G. C., eds. (2018). Drama and Performance in Hellenistic Poetry. Peeters. ISBN 9789042936546.
- Klooster, J. J. H.; Harder, M. A.; Regtuit, R. F.; Wakker, G. C., eds. (2019). Callimachus Revisited: New Perspectives in Callimachean Scholarship. Peeters. ISBN 9789042938502.
- Harder, M. A.; Klooster, J. J. H.; Regtuit, R. F.; Wakker, G. C., eds. (2021). Women and Power in Hellenistic Poetry. Peeters. ISBN 9789042945791.
- Harder, M. A.; Klooster, J. J. H.; Regtuit, R. F.; Wakker, G. C.; Caspers, C. L., eds. (2025). Crisis and Resilience in Hellenistic Poetry. Peeters. ISBN 9789042952652.
