= RADT =

RADT may refer to:

- Ro's Academy of Dog Training (RADT), Dog Training Academy in Benoni, South Africa
- Rapid antigen detection test
- Rapid Application Development Tool
- Royal Albert Dock Trust, also found at London Regatta Centre

Radt may refer to:

- Stefan Radt (1927–2017), Dutch historian, author and academic
- Ro's Academy of Dog Training (RADT), Dog Training Academy in Benoni, South Africa
- Theo de Raadt (born 1968), South African-Canadian software engineer
