= Yannis Hamilakis =

Greek archaeologist and writer (born 1966)

- Born: 1966 (age 59–60); Sitia, Greece

Academic background
- Education: University of Sheffield
- Thesis: (1995)

Academic work
- Discipline: Archaeology
- Institutions: Brown University, University of Southampton
- Website: https://twitter.com/yannishamilakis

Yannis Hamilakis (Greek: Γιάννης Χαμηλάκης, pronounced [ˈʝanis xamiˈlacis]; born 1966) is a Greek archaeologist and writer who is the Joukowsky Family Professor of Archaeology and Professor of Modern Greek Studies at Brown University. He specialises in archaeology of the prehistoric Aegean as well as historical archaeology, including ethnography and anthropology. His research interests include nationalism, postcolonialism, and migration studies.

== Career ==
Hamilakis was raised in Sitia, a town in Crete. He received his BA in History and Archaeology from the University of Crete in 1988, followed by an MSc and PhD from the University of Sheffield. From 2000–2016, he was Professor of Archaeology at the University of Southampton. From 2012–2013, Hamilakis was a member of the Princeton Institute for Advanced Study. He has also been a Fellow at the American School of Classical Studies, Athens; Princeton University; the University of Cincinnati; and the Getty Research Institute, Los Angeles.

Hamilakis has published papers on a wide variety of topics in archaeology and beyond. His most recent work involves the excavation of a Middle Neolithic tell site in central Greece, where he also hosts a range of art projects, including a theatre-archaeology program. He is a prominent advocate of combining ethnography, art, and community engagement in archaeological fieldwork, in the interest of "a politically committed archaeological and academic practice, devoted to social justice." He has also written on the politics of pedagogy and his attempts to create a "border pedagogy" in his teaching.

Hamilakis has been involved in a number of excavations in Greece, including serving as a director at the field projects at Koutroulou Magoula and Kalaureia. Hamilakis sits on the editorial boards of the Annual Review of Anthropology, the Journal of Contemporary Archaeology, the Classical Receptions Journal, the Journal of Mediterranean Archaeology, the Annual of the British School at Athens, the Journal of the Royal Anthropological Institute, Archaeologies: The Journal of the World Archaeological Congress, Research in Archaeological Education, Current Swedish Archaeology, Forum Kritische Archäologie, the Journal of Modern Greek Studies and the WAC Research Handbooks in Archaeology. He has also contributed to non-scholarly publications including The Nation and the London Review of Books. Hamilakis is the author of more than 130 articles and has authored, edited, or co-edited eleven books, including a 2007 volume entitled The Nation and its Ruins: Archaeology, Antiquity and National Imagination in Modern Greece which won the Edmund Keeley 2009 Book Prize, awarded by the Modern Greek Studies Association, and was shortlisted for the 2007 Runciman Award.

== Selected publications ==
As author:

- The Nation and its Ruins: Archaeology, Antiquity and National Imagination in Modern Greece, Oxford University Press, 2007. ISBN 9780199230389.
- Archaeology and the Senses: Human Experience, Memory, and Affect, Cambridge University Press, 2013. ISBN 9780521837286.
- Hamilakis, Y. and Ifantidis, F. 2016. Camera Kalaureia: An Archaeological Photo-ethnography | Μια Αρχαιολογική Φωτο-Εθνογραφία Oxford: Archaeopress.
- Χαμηλάκης, Γ. 2012. Το Έθνος και τα Ερείπιά του. Αρχαιότητα, Αρχαιολογια, και Εθνικό Φαντασιακό στην Ελλάδα. Αθήνα: Εκδόσεις του Εικοστού Πρώτου (translated by Nektarios Kalantzis).
- Χαμηλάκης, Γ. 2015. Η Αρχαιολογία και οι Αισθήσεις. Βίωμα, Μνήμη, και Συν-κίνηση. Αθήνα: Εκδόσεις του Εικοστού Πρώτου (translated by Nikos Kourkoulos).
- Greenberg, R. and Hamilakis, Y. 2022. Archaeology, Nation, and Race: Confronting the Past, Decolonizing the Future in Greece and Israel. Cambridge: Cambridge University Press.

As editor:

- Rainbird, P. and Hamilakis, Y. (eds) 2001 Interrogating Pedagogies: Archaeology in Higher Education. Oxford: BAR/Archaeopress. Pp. 120 (ISBN 1-84171-240-X).
- The Usable Past: Greek Metahistories, Lexington Books, 2003. ISBN 0-7391-0384-9.
- Labyrinth Revisited: Rethinking Minoan Archaeology, Oxbow, 2002. ISBN 1-84217-061-9.
- Thinking Through the Body: Archaeologies of Corporeality, Kluwer/Plenum, 2002. ISBN 0306466481.
- Kotjabopoulou, E., Hamilakis, Halstead, P., Gamble, C., and Elefanti, V. (eds). 2003. Zooarchaeology in Greece: Recent Advances. London: BSA. (ISBN 0904887413).
- Hamilakis, Y. and Duke, P. (eds) 2007. Archaeology and Capitalism: From Ethics to Politics. Walnut Creek, CA: Left Coast Press.
- Hamilakis, Y. and Labanyi, J. (eds) 2008. Remembering and Forgetting in Europe’s Southern Periphery. Special Issue of the journal, History and Memory (vol. 20, issue 2).
- Carabott, P., Hamilakis, Y. and E. Papargyriou, E. (eds) 2015. Camera Graeca: Photographs, Narratives, Materialities. London: Ashgate.
- Hamilakis, Y. and Jones A. (eds) 2017 Archaeology and Assemblage (special thematic issue of the Cambridge Archaeological Journal vol. 27(1).
- Hamilakis, Y. (ed.). 2017 [2016] Archaeologies of Forced and Undocumented Migration (Special, thematic issue of the Journal of Contemporary Archaeology, 3(2).
- Hamilakis, Y. and Momigliano, N. (eds) 2010. Αρχαιολογία και Ευρωπαϊκή Νεοτερικότητα. Παράγοντας και Καταναλώνοντας τους “Μινωίτες”. Αθήνα. Εκδόσεις του Εικοστού Πρώτου (μτ. Νίκος Κούτρας).
