= Shushma Malik =

Scholar of Classical history and reception

- Occupation: Academic

Academic background
- Education: PhD., 2013, University of Bristol

Academic work
- Discipline: Classics
- Sub-discipline: Roman imperial history, Classical reception studies
- Institutions: University of Cambridge; University of Roehampton; University of Queensland; University of Manchester

Shushma Malik is an ancient historian. She is Associate Professor in Classics at the University of Cambridge and the first Onassis Classics Fellow at Newnham College, Cambridge.

== Career ==
Malik studied at the University of Bristol, completing a PhD in Classics and Ancient History in 2013. She joined the University of Cambridge in 2022, having previously lectured at the University of Manchester, the University of Queensland, and the University of Roehampton.

Her research focuses on the Roman emperors, particularly the emperor Nero, and on how Roman emperors were imagined in later cultures. Her monograph, The Nero-Antichrist: founding and fashioning a paradigm, described as "a sophisticated [...] reception history of Nero's legacy," was published in 2020 by Cambridge University Press.

Malik is noted for her media appearances and outreach. She has twice appeared on In Our Time (radio series), discussing Tiberius in 2023, and Nero in 2019. She has appeared on several documentaries as an expert contributor, and her article on Statecraft and the Roman Republic was published in the programme for the National Theatre's production of Coriolanus. While a lecturer at the University of Queensland, she become known for her Mythbusting Ancient Rome series, written with Caillan Davenport and published in The Conversation.
