= Edgar Lobel =

British classical scholar (1888–1982)

- Born: 24 December 1888; Iași, Romania
- Died: 7 July 1982 (aged 93); Oxford, England
- Education: Balliol College, Oxford
- Spouse: Mary Lobel (m. 1927)
- Scientific career
- Fields: Classical philology, papyrology
- Institutions: Queen's College, Oxford, Bodleian Library

Edgar Lobel (24 December 1888 – 7 July 1982) was a Romanian-British classicist and papyrologist who is best known for his four decades overseeing the publication of the literary texts among the Oxyrhynchus Papyri and for his edition of Sappho and Alcaeus in collaboration with Denys Page. His contributions to the fields of papyrology and Greek studies were many and substantial, and Eric Gardner Turner believed that Lobel should "be acknowledged as a scholar to be mentioned in the same breath as Porson and Bentley, a towering genius of English scholarship."

== Early life and education ==
Lobel was born in Iași, Romania on 24 December 1888. As a youth he moved to Higher Broughton with his parents Amelia and Arthur Lobel, a shipowner. He was educated at Kersal School before moving on to Manchester Grammar School where he was head boy and won a scholarship to Balliol College, Oxford in 1906. Despite the fact that his father had been compelled by poverty to emigrate to the United States, Lobel took up his scholarship in 1907 and studied under several noted classicists, including the Lucretius scholar Cyril Bailey and A.W. Pickard-Cambridge In 1911 he graduated having taken first class in Mods and Greats, in addition to winning the Gaisford Prize for Greek Verse and several other University honours. After a year's work as a professor's assistant, he continued his studies at Oxford, where he made close acquaintances of Gilbert Murray and his wife. But perhaps the most important friendship that he struck during this period was with the papyrologist A.S. Hunt, who introduced Lobel to the study of papyrology and induced him to travel to Berlin to study under Wilhelm Schubart in 1913 and 1914.

== Academic career and later life ==
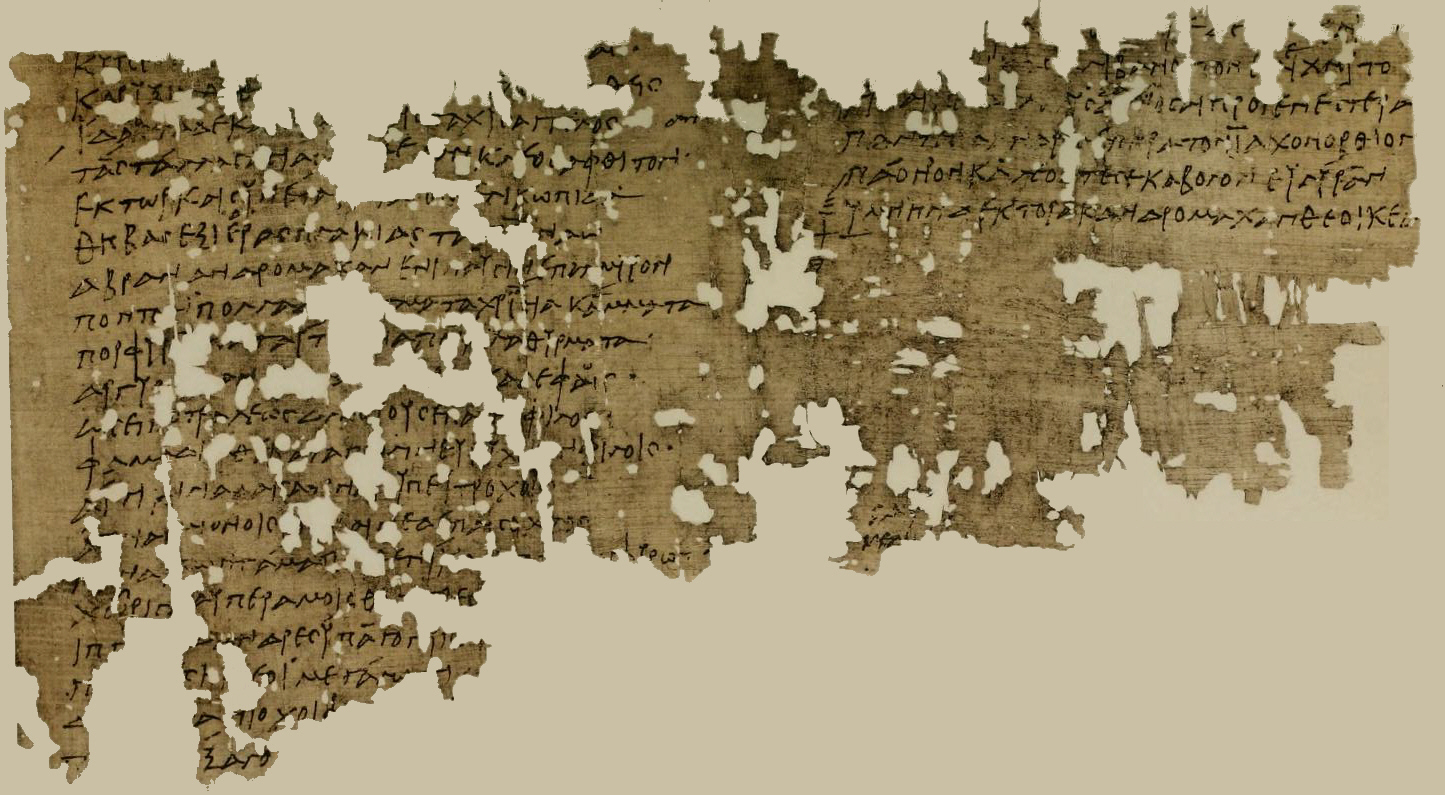
Detail of P.Oxy. X 1232, the papyrus which occasioned the first mention of Lobel in the Oxyrhynchus Papyri: "We are indebted to Mr. E. Lobel for several good suggestions on the text of this papyrus." This text would later stand as Sappho fr. 44 in the text of the Lesbian poets which Lobel prepared with Denys Page.

Before papyri, Lobel’s elective field of research was Greek palaeography. In 1933, he published a book on the manuscripts of Aristotle’s Poetics.

His edition of Sappho and Alcaeus, Poetarum Lesbiorum Fragmenta (co-edited with Denys Page), appeared in 1955, and in the same year Lobel declined to be knighted.

Lobel is best known for having been the general editor of the Oxyrhynchus Papyri from 1941 to 1972; as such he supervised the editing and publishing of twenty-two volumes of the series, from. vol. XVIII to XXIX, which contain more than 700 papyri and gave significant contributions to classical philology and knowledge of Ancient Greek literature—most notably Callimachus, Sappho and Alcaeus.

Lobel never loved teaching: when his college (Queen's) forced him to held a class, he put his lesson on Saturday afternoon. Also, he apparently didn't like papyri per se—instead, he is reported to have said "the poets I like happen to have been transmitted in this way". He also met Ulrich von Wilamowitz-Moellendorff, the most influent German classical scholar of the 20th century, but didn't like him, nor he did like Wilamowitz's favourite author, Euripides: "Euripides, like Wilamowitz, knew no Greek!".

After the Second World War, he composed a funerary epigram in memory of The Queen's College's students fallen during the war. It reads:

Τούτων τοιούτων τε κατ' αἰθέρα καὶ κατὰ πόντον
καὶ κατὰ γῆν ἀρετὴ σῶσε φανεῖσα πάτραν.
πὰρ δ' ἥβην ἐβάλοντο καὶ ἐς τέλος ὤπασε δαίμων
τοῖς μὲν νόστον ἔχειν, τοῖσι δὲ τήνδε λίθος.

and translates into:

The virtue of these men and others of the same kind, displayed in the skies, at sea
and on earth, saved their homeland.
They risked their youth, and God fulfilled
for some of them the fate of returning home and for the others of having this stone.

== Publications ==
=== The Oxryhynchus Papyri ===
- The Oxyrhynchus Papyri, vol. XVIII [2157-2207] (London, 1941)
- The Oxyrhynchus Papyri, vol. XIX [2208-2244] (London, 1948)
- The Oxyrhynchus Papyri, vol. XX [2245-2287] (London, 1952)
- The Oxyrhynchus Papyri, vol. XXI [2288-2308] (London, 1951)
- The Oxyrhynchus Papyri, vol. XXII [2309-2353] (London, 1954)
- The Oxyrhynchus Papyri, vol. XXIII [2354-2382] (London, 1956)
- The Oxyrhynchus Papyri, vol. XXIV [2383-2425] (London, 1957)
- The Oxyrhynchus Papyri, vol. XXV [2426-2437] (London, 1959)
- The Oxyrhynchus Papyri, vol. XXVI [2438-2451] (London, 1961)
- The Oxyrhynchus Papyri, vol. XXVII [2452-2480] (London, 1962)
- The Oxyrhynchus Papyri, vol. XXVIII [2481-2505] (London, 1962)
- The Oxyrhynchus Papyri, vol. XXIX [2506] (London, 1963)
- The Oxyrhynchus Papyri, vol. XXX [2507-2530] (London, 1964)
- The Oxyrhynchus Papyri, vol. XXXI [2531-2616] (London, 1966)
- The Oxyrhynchus Papyri, vol. XXXII [2617-2653] (London, 1967)
- The Oxyrhynchus Papyri, vol. XXXIII [2654-2682] (London, 1968)
- The Oxyrhynchus Papyri, vol. XXXIV [2683-2732] (London, 1968)
- The Oxyrhynchus Papyri, vol. XXXV [2733-2744] (London, 1968)
- The Oxyrhynchus Papyri, vol. XXXVI [2745-2800] (London, 1970)
- The Oxyrhynchus Papyri, vol. XXXVII [2801-2823] (London, 1971)
- The Oxyrhynchus Papyri, vol. XXXVIII [2824-2877] (London, 1971)
- The Oxyrhynchus Papyri, vol. XXXIX [2878-2891] (London, 1972)

Some of these volumes were edited by other scholars (like vol. XXIX, by Sir Denys Page), but Lobel was the general editor of the series. While Vols. XXVIII-XX made significant contributions to our knowledge of Callimachus' works, Lobel, unlike Grenfell and Hunt, ignored non-literary papyri, which make up the majority of material.

=== Critical editions ===
- Σαπφοῦς μέλη: The Fragments of the Lyrical Poems of Sappho (Oxford, 1925)
- Ἀλκαίου μέλη: The Fragments of the Lyrical Poems of Alcaeus (Oxford, 1927)
- (with D. Page) Poetarum Lesbiorum fragmenta (Oxford, 1955)

Poetarum Lesbiorum fragmenta (commonly referred in editions as Lobel-Page or L.-P.) is still one of the two standard editions of Sappho and Alcaeus, the other being E.-M. Voigt (ed.), Sappho et Alcaeus. Fragmenta (Amsterdam 1971). Lobel and Page’s edition, along with Voigt’s, set the standard text for Sappho and Alcaeus’ fragments and no other critical edition of the Lesbian poets had been published until 2021, when Camillo Neri completed his edition of Sappho (critical text with Italian translation and extensive commentary; includes recently—2004, 2014—discovered fragments unknown to both Lobel-Page and Voigt).

Also, Lobel, like Paul Maas, helped Rudolf Pfeiffer with his edition of Callimachus' works and fragments (2 vols., Oxford 1949–1953).

=== Select occasional publications ===
- Greek Manuscripts of Aristotle's Poetics (London, 1933)

== Bibliography ==
- Lehnus, L. (2010), "Edgar Lobel", in Capasso, M. (ed.), Hermae: Scholars and Scholarship in Papyrology, vol. II, Pisa & Rome, ISBN 9788862273374.
- Lloyd-Jones, H. (1991), "Edgar Lobel", Greek in a Cold Climate, Savage, MD, pp. 213–14, ISBN 0389209678.
- Lloyd-Jones, H. (2004), "Lobel, Edgar (1888–1982)]", Oxford Dictionary of National Biography.
- McGuinness, Brian (16 December 1993), "Obituary: Mary Lobel", The Independent
- Turner, E.G. (1980), Greek Papyrology: An Introduction (2nd rev. ed.), Oxford, ISBN 0198148410.
- Turner, E.G. (1983), "Edgar Lobel †", Gnomon, 55 (3): 275–80, JSTOR 27688386.
