= Umbro (priest) =

Umbro is a valorous (fortissimus) warrior-priest of the Marruvians that appears in Book 7 of Virgil's Aeneid and his role has received significant academic coverage. Dinter reports several interpretations of his role. (Note: Dinter 2000, p. 167) These include his being a part of the old Italy that needs to die, or on his death the end of a localism that is being replaced by the Trojan's founding of their new empire. He has the power to make snakes sleep but his herbs and hymns cannot save him from the Trojan's spear. Virgil's lamentation for his death is described as being particularly beautiful and poignant by Adam Parry: For you the grove of Angitia mourned, and Fucinus' glassy waters, And the clear lakes (Te nemus Angitiae, vitrea te Fucinus unda, te liquidi flevere lacus). (Note: Parry 1963, p. 66)

== Bibliography ==
- Dinter, M. (2005). Epic and Epigram—Minor Heroes in Virgil’s Aeneid. The Classical Quarterly, 55(1), 153-169.
- Horsfall, Nicholas (2000) Virgil, Aeneid 7: A Commentary, Mnemos. Bibliotheca Classica Batava, Supplementum Leiden-Boston-Köln
- Putnam, Michael C. J. (1992) Umbro, Nireus and Love’s Threnody. Vergilius 38:12-23 pp. 12–23. JSTOR,
- Parry, Adam (1963). The Two Voices of Virgil’s “Aeneid.” Arion: A Journal of Humanities and the Classics, 2(4), 66–80.
