= Senior Whitehead Prize =

- Awarded for: Work in, influence on or service to mathematics, or recognition of lecturing gifts
- Country: United Kingdom
- Presented by: London Mathematical Society (LMS)
- Established: 1974 (first award)
- Website: lms.ac.uk/prizes/senior-whitehead-prize

The Senior Whitehead Prize of the London Mathematical Society (LMS) is now awarded in odd numbered years in memory of John Henry Constantine Whitehead, president of the LMS between 1953 and 1955. The Prize is awarded to mathematicians normally resident in the United Kingdom on 1 January of the relevant year. Selection criteria include work in, influence on or service to mathematics, or recognition of lecturing gifts in the field of mathematics. Previous recipients of top LMS prizes or medals are ineligible for nomination. Mathematicians from any field are eligible for this award.

== History ==
The London Mathematical Society dates back to 1864. Augustus De Morgan's wife, writing after his death described how the London Mathematical Society was founded: It was in the year 1864 that Mr Arthur Cowper Ranyard and George De Morgan (Augustus De Morgan's son) were discussing mathematical problems during a walk in the streets, when it struck them that it would be very nice to have a society to which discoveries in mathematics could be brought, and where things could be discussed like the Astronomical Society. It was agreed between the young men that this should be proposed and that George should ask his father to take the chair at the first meeting.

At a preliminary meeting to discuss setting up the Society on 7 November 1864, the name 'London Mathematical Society' was chosen. This was not the first name which had been proposed which was 'London University Mathematics Society'. De Morgan first proposed that the name be 'University College Mathematics Society' but then, feeling that aiming at a wider membership would be sensible, he proposed 'London Mathematical Society'. In fact this November 1864 meeting was meant to be the first proper meeting of the Society but De Morgan was ill and could not attend. The chair at this preliminary meeting was taken by T A Hirst, the name of the Society was agreed, and the date for the first meeting proper was set for 16 January 1865. At the 16 January 1865 meeting, held in University College, Bloomsbury, north of central London, the chair was taken by Augustus De Morgan who gave the first address setting out what the aims and practices of the Society should be.

This meeting was attended by 27 mathematicians who were joined as members by a further 43 during the first year of the Society. Cayley, Clifford, De Morgan, Hirst, Maxwell, Salmon, Smith, Spottiswoode and Sylvester had all joined by the end of 1865. The first six Presidents of the Society are among the nine mathematicians we have just listed. Except for De Morgan, who refused a Fellowship of the Royal Society, all presidents of the London Mathematical Society have been Fellows of the Royal Society of London.The Society rapidly expanded and moved away from its initial base in University College. Within two years of the founding of the Society it had moved into Burlington House, Piccadilly, occupying a room in the premises of the Royal Astronomical Society. There was, of course, already a connection with the Royal Astronomical Society since that Society had earlier absorbed the Spitalfields Mathematical Society. The Society rapidly gained international status, and two years after it was founded, in 1867, it instituted a category of honorary foreign member. The first such member was Chasles.From its foundation the Society decided that it would publish a journal, the Proceedings of the London Mathematical Society.

Between the first meeting in January 1865 up to November 1866, 37 papers had been presented. However the membership had rapidly increased and the cost of distributing the Proceeding to the members would have been too expensive if all the papers had been published. To keep down costs only eleven of the 37 papers were published. Financial pressures continued on the young Society, largely caused by the high volume of papers it was receiving. Only a donation of £1000 by Rayleigh in 1874 allowed the Society to become financially secure.

The quantity and quality of papers published in the Proceeding was impressive, over 900 papers appearing by 1900.The London Mathematical Society established prestigious prizes early in its existence. Once the finances allowed, the Society began the award of its De Morgan Medal. It was awarded once every three years, the first award being made to Cayley in 1884. The next recipients were Sylvester (1887), Rayleigh (1890), Klein (1893), Roberts (1896), and Burnside (1899).

== Prize winners ==
- 1974 Frank Adams
- 1976 C. T. C. Wall
- 1978 Ioan Mackenzie James
- 1980 David George Kendall
- 1982 Christopher Zeeman
- 1984 John Trevor Stuart
- 1987 Robert Alexander Rankin
- 1989 Edward Fraenkel
- 1991 W. B. R. Lickorish
- 1993 Bryan John Birch
- 1995 Colin J. Bushnell
- 1997 John H. Coates
- 1999 Michael J. D. Powell
- 2001 Derek W. Moore
- 2003 Peter M. Neumann
- 2005 Keith Moffatt
- 2007 Béla Bollobás
- 2009 Vladimir Gilelevich Maz'ya
- 2011 Jonathan Pila
- 2013 Frances Clare Kirwan
- 2015 Robert Sinclair MacKay
- 2017 Peter Cameron
- 2019 Ben Green
- 2021 Tara E. Brendle
- 2023 Agata Smoktunowicz
- 2025 Leonid Pastur

== See also ==
- Berwick Prize
- De Morgan Medal
- Shephard Prize
- Fröhlich Prize
- List of mathematics awards
- Naylor Prize and Lectureship
- Pólya Prize (LMS)
- Whitehead Prize
