= Derek W. Moore =

British mathematician (1931–2008)

Derek William Moore (19 April 1931 – 15 July 2008) was a British mathematician.

He was born in South Shields, where his father was a head of department at the nautical college. He was educated at the local grammar school and Jesus College, Cambridge.

In 1956 he began research into theoretical fluid dynamics at the Cavendish Laboratory, followed by spells at Bristol University and the NASA Goddard Space Flight Center in New York. In 1967 he moved to Imperial College London to become a Professor of Applied Mathematics, holding the post for the rest of his career.

In 2001, he was awarded the Senior Whitehead Prize by the London Mathematical Society. He was a foreign honorary member of the American Academy of Arts and Sciences and a Fellow of the Royal Society.
