= Stephanie West =

British scholar in classics and ancient history

Stephanie West FBA
- Born: Stephanie Roberta Pickard; 1 December 1937 (age 88)
- Spouse: Martin Litchfield West (m. 1960; died 2015)

Academic background
- Education: Somerville College, Oxford
- Thesis: The Ptolemaic papyri of Homer (1964)

Academic work
- Discipline: Classics
- Sub-discipline: Homer; Herodotus; Lycophron
- Institutions: Somerville College, Oxford; Hertford College, Oxford; Keble College, Oxford

Stephanie Roberta West FBA (née Pickard; 1 December 1937) is a British classical scholar specialising in the study of Homer, Herodotus, and Lycophron.

== Early life and education ==
Stephanie Roberta Pickard was born on 1 December 1937. She was educated at Nottingham Girls' High School, an independent school in Nottingham. She studied Literae humaniores (i.e. classics) at Somerville College, Oxford, achieving first class honours in mods in 1958 and in greats in 1960. In 1959, West (then Pickard) won the Gaisford Prize for Greek Verse while a student at Somerville, having previously won the First Craven Scholarship. She graduated from the University of Oxford with a Bachelor of Arts (BA) in 1960. She remained at Somerville to undertake a Doctor of Philosophy (DPhil) degree, which she completed in 1964. Her doctoral thesis was titled "The Ptolemaic papyri of Homer", and was supervised by Professor Hugh Lloyd-Jones.

== Academic career ==
From 1965 to 1967, West was a Mary Ewart Research Fellow at Somerville College, Oxford. From 1966 to 2005, she was a lecturer in classics at Hertford College, Oxford. From 1981 to 2005, she was also a lecturer in Greek at Keble College, Oxford. She was the Fellow Librarian of Hertford from 1990 to 2005.

She is an honorary fellow of Hertford College. In 1990, she was elected as a Fellow of the British Academy (FBA), the United Kingdom's national academy for the humanities and social sciences. She was elected as a Foreign Member of the Polish Academy of Arts and Sciences in 2012.

In recognition of her work for the college a photograph of West featured in the all-female portrait gallery on the walls of the great hall of Hertford College. The gallery was established in 2014 to celebrate the 40th anniversary of the first female fellows elected to the college.

== Personal life ==
West met her eventual husband Martin West (d. 2015), a fellow Classicist, in 1960 at a lecture by former chair in Latin Eduard Fraenkel at Corpus Christi College, Oxford. The pair married in 1960, in Nottingham, and lived together in Portland Road, Oxford. Together, they had one daughter and one son.

== Selected publications ==
- 1967. The Ptolemaic papyri of Homer
- 1981. Omero, Odissea 1 (libri I-IV)
- 1988. A commentary on Homer's Odyssey
- 2002. Demythologisation in Herodotus
