= Janice M. Benario =

American classical scholar

Janice Marguerite Martin Benario
- Born: February 19, 1923; Baltimore, Maryland
- Died: December 2, 2020 (aged 97); Atlanta, Georgia
- Spouse: Herbert W. Benario
- Children: Fred and John

Academic background
- Education: A.B. Goucher College; M.S./Ph.D. John Hopkins
- Thesis: The structure of Horace's Odes (1952)

Academic work
- Discipline: Classical languages
- Institutions: Georgia State University

Janice M. Benario (February 19, 1923 – December 2, 2020) was an American classical scholar, educator, and an officer in the U. S. Navy (WAVES) during World War II. She was professor emerita of modern and classical languages at Georgia State University.

== Biography ==
Janice Marguerite Martin was born in Baltimore, the only child of J. Elmer Martin and Gladys Katherin née Martin (also). Her father was an attorney. Janice was educated locally, where she gained interest in dancing, languages, and history. After graduating from Western High in 1939, she matriculated to nearby Goucher College on a scholarship, where she majored in Latin and minored in history. At this women's college, she was a member of Phi Beta Kappa. In 1943, Martin graduated with an A.B. in Latin.

In 1941, the United States entered World War II as a member of the allied coalition. While a senior at Goucher in 1942, Martin was asked by Elizabeth Winslow whether she would take a course in cryptology as part of the war effort. After completion, the following spring she was inducted into the Women's Navy Unit (WAVES). Following a course of general indoctrination, she joined OP-20-G, the Naval communications annex. Martin was cleared to handle top secret Ultra material.

She went on active duty, September 1943. As a junior watch officer, she worked with the group processing decoded messages from German Admiral Dönitz to the U-boat fleet in the Atlantic Ocean. In September 1945, with the war over, she was put to work in the Bureau of Medicine grading correspondence courses. She was released in May 1946 with the rank of Lieutenant, junior grade, and put on inactive service.

At some point prior to 1952 she was married for a time, with her name becoming Janice M. Cordray. Martin entered graduate school at Johns Hopkins University in Baltimore, studying classical languages, Greek and Latin. She received her M.S. in 1949, then met her future husband, Herbert W. Benario (1929–2022), a fellow grad student. She was granted a Ph.D. in 1952 with a thesis titled, The structure of Horace's Odes.

=== Career ===
Martin received a Ford Foundation grant in 1953 and became a teaching intern at St. Johns College in Annapolis, Maryland. The following year she became an instructor in classics at Sweet Briar College in Virginia. She was promoted to assistant professor in 1957, and participated at the summer session of the American Academy in Rome (AAR). In December 1957, she was married to Herbert W. Benario, then an instructor in Greek and Latin at Columbia. The couple would have two children, Fred and John.

In 1960, the couple moved to Atlanta, Georgia where she started the classics program as an assistant professor at Georgia State University. Her husband joined nearby Emory University as associate professor of classics. She became associate professor at Georgia State in 1962. She was associate professor of foreign languages at Georgia State, during 1984-9. After retiring as professor emerita, Benario was named associate professor of classics at Emory from 1989–1994. She spent 1997 teaching at Agnes Scott College.

Beginning in 1960, she served as editor for the Vergilius journal, up until 1963 when she joined the editorial board. From 1963–1969, she served as President of the Classical Society of the AAR, then president of the Classical and Modern Foreign Language Association, 1969–71. In 1973, she once again assumed the editorship of the Vergilius and continued until 1979. In 1982, she was awarded the excellence in teaching award of the American Philological Association. In 2010, Janice and Herbert Benario received the CAMWS award for special service.

== Bibliography ==
Her published works include:

- Benario, Janice M. (1960), "Book 4 of Horace's Odes, Augustan Propaganda", Transactions and Proceedings of the American Philological Association, 91, The Johns Hopkins University: 339–352, doi:10.2307/283861, JSTOR 283861.
- Benario, Janice M. (1970), "Dido and Cleopatra", Vergilius (1959-), 16, The Vergilian Society: 2–6, JSTOR 41591641.
- Benario, Janice M. (Winter 2001), "Sir Edward Burne-Jones: The Perseus Series", The Classical Outlook, 78 (2), American Classical League: 53–57, JSTOR 43938417.
- Cordray, Janice M. (December 1956), "The Structure of Horace's Odes: Some Typical Patterns", The Classical Journal, 52 (3), The Johns Hopkins University: 113–116, JSTOR 3294893.
