= John Dewar Denniston =

British classical scholar (1887 – 1949)

Denniston in 1938

John Dewar Denniston (4 March 1887 in India – 2 May 1949 in Church Stretton) was a British classical scholar.

His parents were James Lawson Denniston, of the Indian Civil Service, and Agnes Guthrie. He was educated at Winchester College and New College, Oxford. He took a First in Classical Moderations (Greek and Latin) in 1908 and a Second in Literae Humaniores (philosophy and ancient history) in 1910. He was Fellow of Hertford College, Oxford, from 1913 until his death.

He served in the First World War, 1914–18, 7th King's Own Scottish Borderers and General Staff War Office. He was twice wounded; he gained the distinctions of Croix de Guerre and O.B.E.

He is best known and remembered for his work The Greek Particles, which on his death was revised and expanded from his later notes in a second edition by Kenneth Dover.

== Publications ==
- Greek Literary Criticism (1924)
- Cicero Philippics I and II (1925)
- The Greek Particles (1934)
- Euripides' Electra (1939)
- Oxford Classical Dictionary co-editor, (1949)
- Greek Prose Style (1952)
- Aeschylus' Agamemnon edited with Denys Page, (1957)
