= Edward Fraenkel =

British mathematician (1927–2019)

Edward Fraenkel FRS
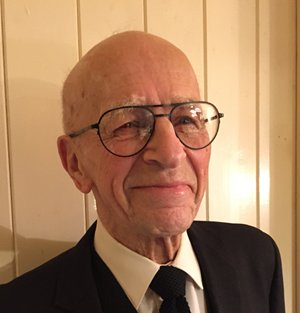
- Fraenkel in 2017
- Born: Ludwig Eduard Fraenkel; 28 May 1927; Kiel, Prussia, Germany
- Died: 27 April 2019 (aged 91)
- Citizenship: British
- Education: University of Toronto (BSc, MSc)
- Awards: Senior Whitehead Prize
- Scientific career
- Workplaces: University of Bath
- Thesis: On the design of nozzles for supersonic wind tunnels (1948)

Ludwig Edward Fraenkel FRS (28 May 1927 – 27 April 2019) was a German-born British mathematician, and professor at the University of Bath. He was the son of classicist Eduard Fraenkel.

== Education ==
Fraenkel earned an undergraduate degree (in 1947) and a Master of Science degree (in 1948) from the University of Toronto in the area of Aeronautical Engineering. His thesis was on the design of nozzles for supersonic wind tunnels.

== Awards and honours ==
In 1989, he was awarded the Senior Whitehead Prize. He was elected a Fellow of the Royal Society in 1993.
