= Christopher Stray =

British historian of classical scholarship

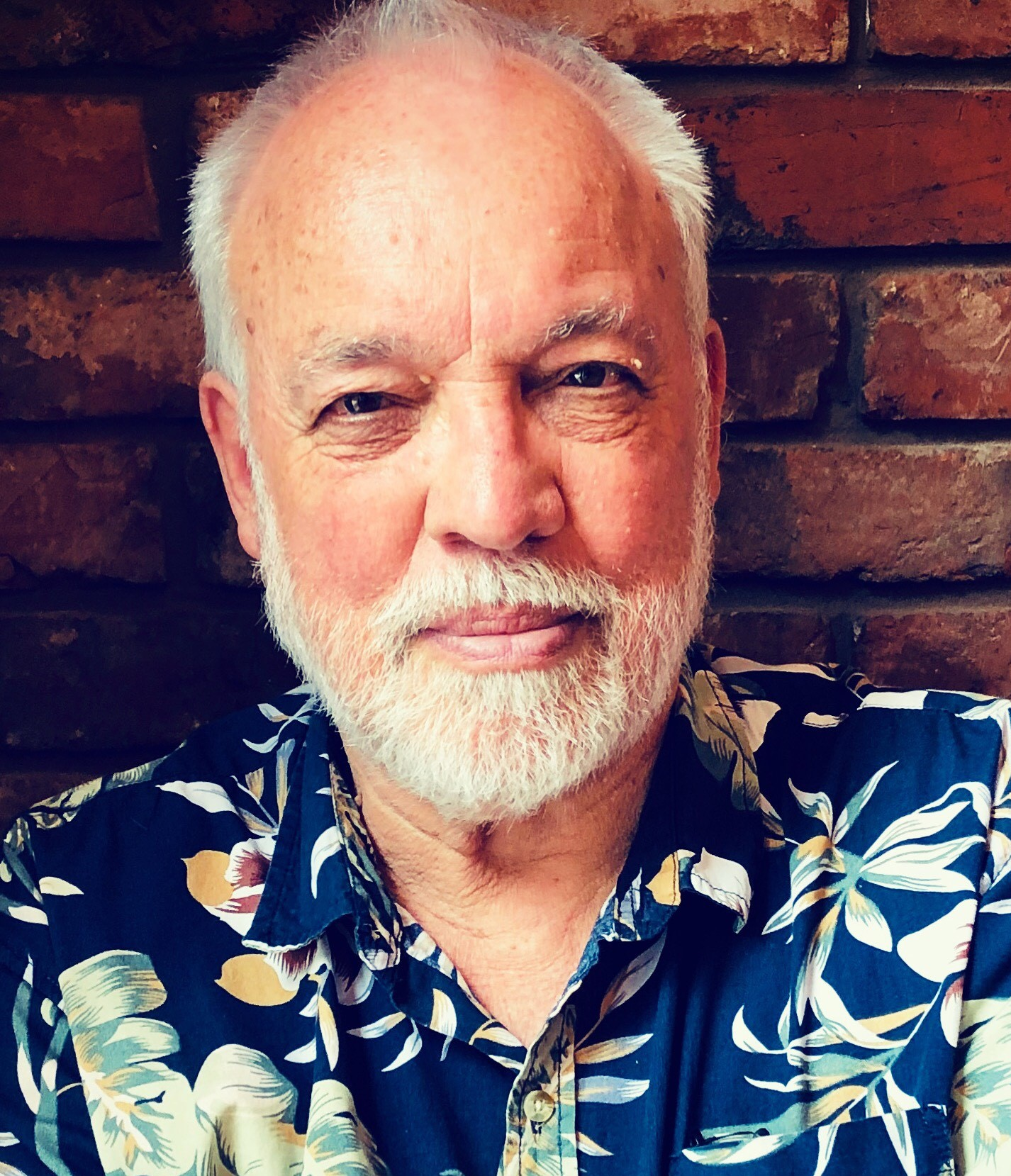
Christopher Stray

Christopher Allan Stray (born 29 October 1943) is a British retired teacher and academic. He is an expert in classical reception, specializing in the history of classical scholarship and teaching.

== Early life and education ==
Born at Norwich, son of Peter Stray and Margaret (née Beard), Stray read Classics at Sidney Sussex College, Cambridge, taking a BA in 1966 and MA in 1985. He worked as a classics teacher, including at Latymer Upper School, West London, and was a member of the JACT Ancient History Committee in the late 1960s, under the chairmanship of Sir Moses Finley.

== Career ==
His academic writings began with his PhD thesis (1994, University College, Swansea) on the history of classical education in England, which was published as Classics Transformed: Schools, Universities and Society in England, 1830-1960 (Oxford University Press, 1998 ISBN 9780198150138). The book was awarded a Runciman Prize in 1999. Stray has also worked on the history of universities, on examinations, and on institutional slang.

Despite never holding a salaried academic post, Stray has held numerous visiting and honorary positions including: an honorary research fellowship in the Department of History and Classics, Swansea University (from 1989); visiting fellow at Wolfson College, Cambridge (1996–1998); John D and Rose H Jackson Fellowship at the Beinecke Library, Yale University (2005); senior research fellow at the Institute of Classical Studies, University of London (2010–2018); member of the School of Historical Studies, Institute for Advanced Study, Princeton (2012); and visiting fellow commoner, Trinity College, Cambridge (Michaelmas Term 2024).

He has also been active in collaborative research projects, and in the organisation of conferences and colloquia, including: Convener of the Textbook Colloquium (1988–99); co-organiser (with Stephen Harrison and Chris Kraus) of conference on "Classical Commentaries" (Oxford, 2012); member of advisory board, "Classics and Class in Britain", King's College London, 2013–16 (from 2016 "People’s History of Classics"); co-organiser (with Stephen Harrison) of conference on "Liddell & Scott" (Oxford, 2013). A colloquium in his honour was held in Oxford in October 2018, organised by Stephen Harrison.

A Festschrift was published in his honour in 2021: Classical Scholarship and Its History From the Renaissance to the Present. Essays in Honour of Christopher Stray, edited by Stephen Harrison and Christopher Pelling. In 2024, he was awarded the Kenyon Medal by the British Academy "for almost single-handedly creating the field of the institutional history of Classics."

== Personal life ==
Stray married anthropologist Margaret Kenna, of Swansea University; they have a son.

== Works ==
=== Books ===
- The Living Word: W. H. D. Rouse and the Crisis of Classics in Edwardian England (Bristol Classical Press, London 1992) ISBN 9781853992629
- Classics Transformed: Schools, Universities and Society in England, 1830-1960 (Oxford University Press, 1998) ISBN 9780198150138
- Classics in Britain, 1800-2000 (Clarendon Press, 2018) ISBN 9780199569373

=== As editor ===
- The Classical Association: The First Century 1903–2003 (Classical Association, 2003) ISBN 9780198528746
- Classics in 19th and 20th Century Cambridge: Curriculum, Culture and Community (Cambridge Philological Society, 2005; Proceedings of the Cambridge Philological Society, Supplement 24) ISBN 0906014239
- The Owl of Minerva. The Cambridge praelections of 1906. Reassessments of Richard Jebb, James Adam, Walter Headlam, Henry Jackson, William Ridgeway and Arthur Verrall (Cambridge Philological Society, 2005; Proceedings of the Cambridge Philological Society, Supplement 28 ISBN 0906014271
- Remaking the Classics. Literature, genre and media in Britain (1800–2000) (Duckworth, 2007) ISBN 9780715636732
- Gilbert Murray Reassessed. Hellenism, Theatre, and International Politics (Oxford University Press, 2007) ISBN 9780199208791
- Oxford Classics: Teaching and Learning 1800–2000 (Duckworth, 2007) ISBN 9780715636459
- Classical Books: Scholarship and Publishing in Britain Since 1800 (Institute of Classical Studies, School of Advanced Study, University of London, 2007; Bulletin of the Institute of Classical Studies, Supplement 101) ISBN 9781905670154
- Classical Dictionaries. Past, present and future (Duckworth, 2010) ISBN 9780715639160
- Sophocles’ Jebb: A Life in Letters (Cambridge Philological Society, 2013; Cambridge Classical Journal supplement, 38).
- Expurgating the Classics: Editing Out in Greek and Latin (Bristol Classical Press, London 2012) ISBN 9780956838131
- With David Butterfield: A. E. Housman: Classical Scholar (Duckworth, 2009) ISBN 9780715638088
- With Michael Clarke and Joshua Katz: Liddell and Scott: The History, Methodology, and Languages of the World's Leading Lexicon of Ancient Greek (Oxford University Press, 2019) ISBN 9780198810803
- With Judith P. Hallett: British Classics Outside England – The Academy and Beyond (Baylor University Press, Waco, Texas, 2008) ISBN 9781602580121
- With Lorna Hardwick: A Companion to Classical Receptions (Wiley, 2008) ISBN 9781405151672
- With Chris Pelling and Stephen Harrison: Rediscovering E.R.Dodds: Scholarship, Poetry, and the Paranormal (Oxford University Press, 2019) ISBN 9780198777366
- With Jonathan Smith: Cambridge in the 1830s. The Letters of Alexander Chisholm Gooden, 1831–1841 (Boydell Press, Woodbridge, 2003) ISBN 9781843830108
- With Jonathan Smith: Teaching and Learning in Nineteenth-century Cambridge (Boydell & Brewer, Woodbridge, 2001) ISBN 9780851157832
- With Stephen Halliwell: Scholarship and Controversy: Centenary Essays on the Life and Work of Sir Kenneth Dover (Bloomsbury, 2023) ISBN 978-1350333451

=== As contributor ===
- Classics in the curriculum up to the 1960s (in The Teaching of Classics ed. James Morwood, Cambridge University Press, 2003) ISBN 9780521527637
