= Lorna Hardwick =

Academic work
- Discipline: Classics
- Sub-discipline: Classical reception studies
- Institutions: Open University; University College London

Lorna Hardwick is professor emerita of classical studies at the Open University. She is a leading authority on classical reception studies and has published several books and articles on the subject, as well being the first editor of the Classical Receptions Journal.

== Career ==
In addition to teaching at the Open University, Hardwick has taught at University College London. Hardwick's publications in the field of classical reception include Translating Words, Translating Cultures (2000) and New Surveys in the Classics: Reception Studies (2003) as well as a number of articles on drama and poetry. She has a particular interest in the impact of various kinds of translation and adaptation on modern perceptions of Greece and Rome and in the reworking of classical material in post-colonial contexts (publications).

From 2000 to 2005, Hardwick was subject director for classics and ancient history in the Higher Education Academy Subject Centre for History, Classics and Archaeology. From 2005 to 2007 she served as president of the Joint Association of Classical Teachers.

She is the editor of the Classical Receptions Journal and co-series editor of 'The Classical Presences series' published by Oxford University Press.

In 2014, she was a signatory in an open letter published in The Guardian expressing concern at the Open University's closure of regional offices.

== Select bibliography ==
- Rome in the Late Republic (with Michael Crawford, 1985, revised 1999); ISBN 0-7156-2928-X
- For 'Anyone who wishes': classical studies in the Open University, 1971-2002 (in The Teaching of Classics ed. James Morwood, Cambridge University Press, 2003) ISBN 9780521527637
- Translating words, Translating Cultures (Duckworth, 2004); ISBN 9780715629123
- A Companion to Classical Receptions (with Christopher Stray, 2007) ISBN 9781405151672
- Classics in Post-Colonial Worlds (with Carol Gillespie, 2007) ISBN 978-0-19-929610-1
- ‘Voices of Trauma: Remaking Aeschylus in the Twentieth Century’, (in S. E. Constantinidis, ed., The Reception of Aeschylus’ Plays through Shifting Models and Frontiers)
