= Cedric Whitman =

American poet and academic (1916–1979)

Cedric Hubbell Whitman (December 1, 1916 – June 5, 1979) was an American poet and academic from Providence, Rhode Island. He received his PhD from Harvard University in 1947 and joined the faculty that year. In 1966, he became the first Jones Professor of Classic Literature. In 1974, Whitman became the Eliot Professor of Greek Literature, a position he would serve until his death in 1979.

Whitman is known for his research into the Greek playwrights, particularly Sophocles, and into Homer, He wrote Sophocles: A Study in Heroic Humanism in 1951 which won him the Award of Merit of the American Philological Association the following year. His 1958 book, Homer and the Heroic Tradition, won him the Christian Gauss Prize.
