= Classical reception =

Aspect of culture

Strauss and Hofmannsthal at work on Elektra, wrestling with Sophocles

The study of classical reception concerns how the classical world, especially Ancient Greek literature and Latin literature, has been received since antiquity. It is the study of the portrayal and representation of the ancient world from ancient to modern times. The nature of reception studies is highly interdisciplinary, including literature, art, music, film, and games. The field of study has, within the past few decades, become an increasingly popular and legitimized topic of interest in classical studies.

== Definition ==
Lorna Hardwick and Christopher Stray assert that Classical reception studies are devoted to examining "the ways in which Greek and Roman material has been transmitted, translated, excerpted, interpreted, rewritten, re-imaged and represented." Martindale notes that Classical reception "encompasses all work concerned with postclassical material."

Hardwick has also previously defined classical reception as "the artistic or intellectual processes involved in selecting, imitating or adapting ancient works," that also treats display and viewing as active processes.

Hardwick and Stray state that scholars of reception studies believe that the relationship between the ancient and modern is reciprocal, although they acknowledge that others consider that reception studies only shed light on the receiving society, and not on the ancient text or its context. Although reception theory originated from Hans Robert Jauss in the late 1960s, classicists took about 30 years to officially adopt the term. Wide-scale acceptance did not occur until 2009, with the launch of Oxford's on-line periodical, the Classical Receptions Journal.

== History ==
This area of study was first, and historically considered a subset of the classical tradition. Before reception gained interest, the classical tradition was discussed and popularized in the 1920s. While the classical tradition mainly focuses on how and why Classics fit into the modern world, the term reception now encompasses classical traditions, with a wide range over the interplay between the cultures that draw inspiration from classical societies and the past itself. Due to the nature of classical reception, which was heavily influenced by reception theory, classical reception theory departs from the classical tradition in various ways.

Tradition tends to put a premium on continuity, the simple passing down of one influence to another, the context that informed some earlier material. Reception, on the other hand, stresses the mediated, situated, contingent character of readings, and the concept that there is no final, correct meaning for any text. Charles Martindale, a pioneer in classical reception, stated that "our current interpretations of ancient texts, whether or not we are aware of it, are, in complex ways, constructed by the chain of receptions through which their continued readability has been effected. As a result we cannot get back to any originary meaning wholly free of subsequent accretions." Classical texts are not simply handed down, as implied by the Classical Tradition, but are in fact transformed as they are passed along.

While scholars generally agree that classical reception differs from the classical tradition, the term classical reception has a variety of definitions. Classical reception scholar Johanna Hanink defines classical reception as "how the ancient past is visibly interwoven in the fabric of the present moment." The Open University's Classical Receptions in Drama and Poetry in English project adds that "classical receptions also involves analysis of the mediating aspects, such as translation, scholarship, cultural narratives (oral, written and performed) and the artistic and literary practices that create these."

== See also ==
- Neo-Latin studies

== Bibliography ==
- Blevins, Jacob (2009). American Journal of Philology. 130 (1): 146–150. doi:10.1353/ajp.0.0043. ISSN 1086-3168.
- De Pourcq, Maarten (2012). "Classical reception studies: reconceptualizing the study of the classical tradition". International Journal of the Humanities. 9 (4): 219–226.
- Hardwick, Lorna (2009-01-01). Classical Receptions Journal. 1 (1): 1–3. doi:10.1093/crj/clp008. ISSN 1759-5134.
- Hardwick, Lorna; Stray, Christopher, eds. (2011) [First published 2008]. A companion to classical receptions (Paperback ed.). Wiley. ISBN 978-1-4443-3922-2.
- Henderson, John (2008). "Review of "A companion to classical receptions"". Bryn Mawr Classical Review. ISSN 1055-7660.
- Tatum, James (2014). "A real short introduction to classical reception theory". Arion. 22 (2): 75–96. doi:10.1353/arn.2014.0011. ISSN 2327-6436.
