= Vergilius (journal) =

- Discipline: Vergilian studies: Classical studies, Humanities, Language, Literature
- Language: English
- Edited by: Hunter Gardner

Publication details
- Former name(s): The Vergilian Digest
- History: 1956–present
- Publisher: The Vergilian Society
- Frequency: Annual

Standard abbreviations
- ISO 4: Vergilius

Indexing
- ISSN: 0506-7294
- LCCN: 81644013
- JSTOR: 05067294
- OCLC no.: 859952122

Links
- Journal homepage

Vergilius is an annual peer-reviewed academic journal published by The Vergilian Society. It was established in 1956 as The Vergilian Digest, obtaining its current title in 1959. The journal's primary focus is on works of Virgil, and, broadly speaking, classical studies, humanities, language, and literature. The editor-in-chief is Hunter Gardner (The University of South Carolina). The journal is abstracted and indexed in L'Année philologique.
