= Ivan Mortimer Linforth =

American classics professor (1879–1976)

Ivan Mortimer Linforth (15 September 1879, San Francisco – 15 December 1976, Berkeley, California) was an American scholar, Professor of Greek at University of California, Berkeley. According to the Biographical Dictionary of North American Classicists he was "one of the great Hellenists of his time". He is best known for his book The Arts of Orpheus (1941), in which he analysed a large number of sources for Orphism and Orphic literature. His work is noted for its thoroughly sceptical approach to the evidence, attempting to the repudiate the notions of a coherent Orphism put forward by earlier scholars. His conclusion was that there was no exclusively "Orphic" system of belief in Ancient Greece. His work had an impact on the scholarship of Orphism, with Eric R. Dodds writing in 1951 that due to Linforth "[t]he edifice reared by an ingenious scholarship upon these foundations remains for me a house of dreams".
