= Stefan Radt =

Dutch historian (1927-2017)

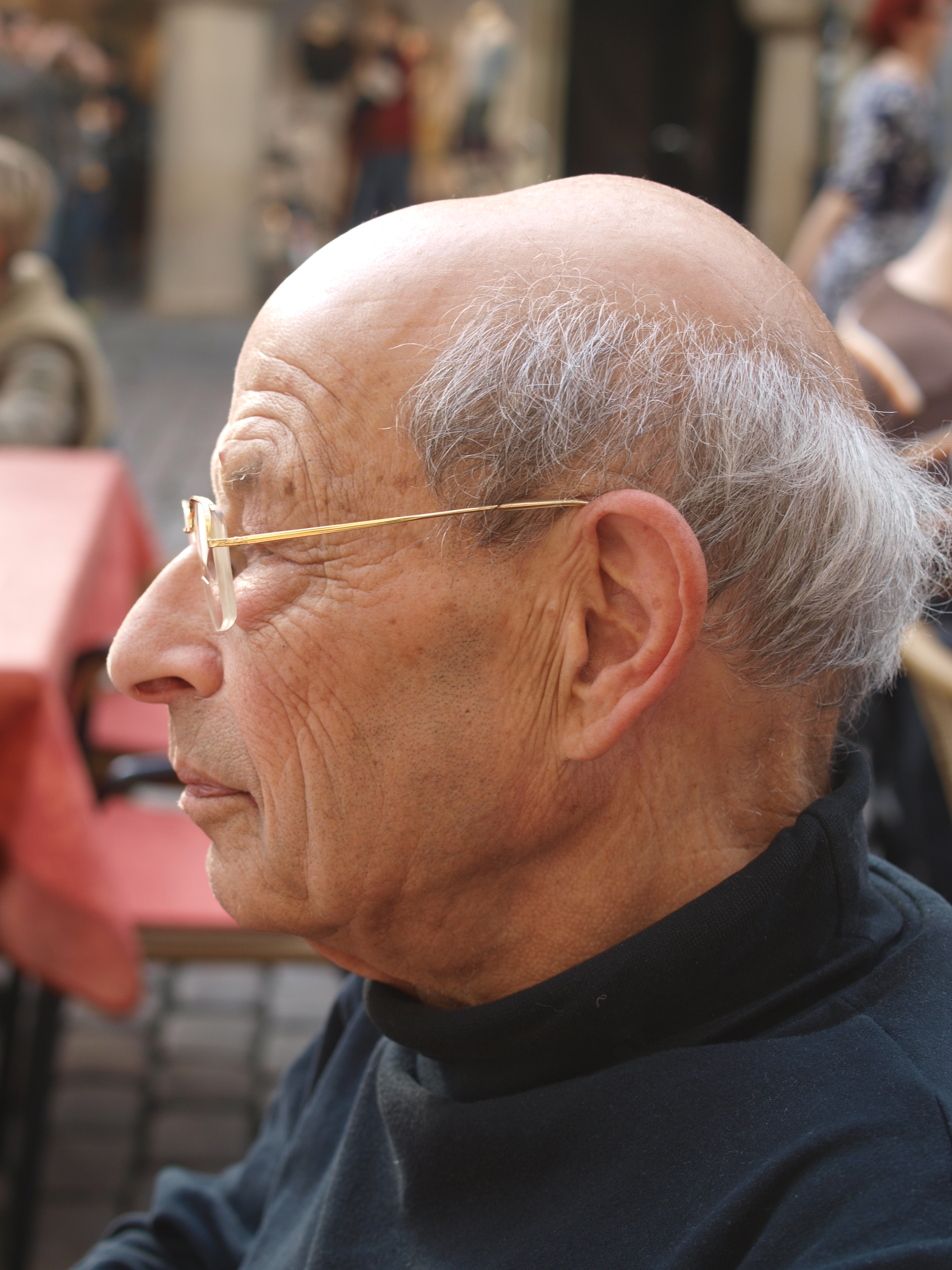
Stefan Radt, 2009

Stefan Lorenz Radt (4 August 1927, Berlin − 22 November 2017) was a Dutch historian, author and academic specializing in ancient Greek geography.

== Works ==
His books have received mostly positive reviews.

Some of his notable books are:

- Tragicorum Graecorum Fragmenta
- Strabons Geographika, a German translation of Strabo's Geographica
- The Importance Of The Context
