= Hugh Lloyd-Jones =

British classical philologist (1922–2009)

Sir Hugh Lloyd-Jones FBA
- Born: Peter Hugh Jefferd Lloyd-Jones; 21 September 1922; Saint Peter Port, Guernsey, Channel Islands
- Died: 5 October 2009 (aged 87); Wellesley, Massachusetts, U.S.
- Occupations: Classical scholar and Regius Professor of Greek
- Spouses: Frances Hedley (m. 1953; div. 1981) Mary Lefkowitz (m. 1982)

Academic background
- Education: Westminster School
- Alma mater: Christ Church, Oxford

Academic work
- Institutions: Jesus College, Cambridge; Corpus Christi College, Oxford
- Doctoral students: Colin Austin, Annette Harder, Martin Litchfield West, Stephanie West
- Military career
- Allegiance: United Kingdom
- Branch: British Army
- Rank: Captain
- Unit: Intelligence Corps
- Wars: Second World War

Sir Peter Hugh Jefferd Lloyd-Jones FBA (21 September 1922 – 5 October 2009) was a British classical scholar and Regius Professor of Greek at the University of Oxford. Educated at Westminster School and at Christ Church, Oxford, he served as a linguist and intelligence officer during the Second World War, including a stint at the code-breaking centre at Bletchley Park. After a brief fellowship at Jesus College, Cambridge, he moved to Corpus Christi College, Oxford, where he remained for the rest of his academic career. In 1961, he was made Regius Professor of Greek.

Lloyd-Jones's publications included editions of the Greek playwrights Menander, Sophocles and Aeschylus, as well as works on classical literature and classical reception. He was knighted on his retirement in 1989, and died in 2009 in Wellesley, Massachusetts, where he lived with his second wife, Mary Lefkowitz.

== Early life and education ==
Lloyd-Jones was educated at Westminster School where he developed an interest in Modern History before being converted to classics by his headmaster, J. T. Christie. He pursued undergraduate and postgraduate studies at Christ Church, Oxford. He achieved first class honours in "Mods" in 1941.

His studies, however, were interrupted by the Second World War. In February 1942, he was one of a group consisting mostly of classicists from Oxford and Cambridge who were assigned to study Japanese at the secret Bedford Japanese School run by Captain Oswald Tuck of the Royal Navy. Lloyd-Jones was in the first course run at the school, which lasted for only five months. After Bedford he was sent to the Military Wing at Bletchley Park, and then he received further training at the Foreign Office and the Ministry of Economic Warfare. He was granted an emergency commission as a second lieutenant in the British Indian Army on 15 December 1942. Subsequently he was posted to the Wireless Experimental Centre, Delhi, where he worked as an officer in the Intelligence Corps. According to Oswald Tuck's account, these three were the "key men" at the Wireless Experimental Centre. He transferred to the British Army on 1 September 1945, with seniority in the rank of lieutenant from 15 June 1943. Following the end of the war, he was invited to join the British Commonwealth Occupation Force in Japan, but turned it down as he was eager to get back to his studies. He ended the war as a captain.

== Career ==
Lloyd-Jones took a first degree in Greats in 1948 and gained several university prizes. For a while he was a Fellow of Jesus College, Cambridge, and while there met his first wife, Frances Hedley, a classics student at Newnham College, whom he married in 1953. The couple had two sons and a daughter and were divorced in 1981. In 1951 Lloyd-Jones returned to Oxford where he became the first holder of the E. P. Warren Praelectorship at Corpus Christi College.

Lloyd-Jones supervised a number of distinguished doctoral students, including Colin Austin, Annette Harder, Martin Litchfield West, and Stephanie West. In his inaugural address as Regius Professor in 1961 he called for a reduction in the emphasis laid on composition taught to undergraduates and suggested that Honour Moderations might have to be reformed to encompass studies taken from ancient philosophy and history as well as the traditional literature and language.

He contributed editions of Menander's Dyscolus (1960) and of Sophocles (1990, together with Nigel Wilson) to the Oxford Classical Texts, and editions and translations of the Aeschylean fragments (1960) and of Sophocles (2000) to the Loeb Classical Library.

Lloyd-Jones was elected a Fellow of the British Academy in 1966 and was a member of five foreign academies, holding honorary doctorates from the universities of Chicago, Tel Aviv, Göttingen and Thessaloniki. He was a member of both the American Academy of Arts and Sciences and the American Philosophical Society. His retirement from the Regius Chair in 1989, after twenty-nine years, was marked by a knighthood.

He married his second wife Mary R. Lefkowitz, Professor Emerita of Classical Studies at Wellesley College in Massachusetts, in 1982, and spent his last 27 years at their home in Wellesley.

== Major publications ==
- Lloyd-Jones, Hugh (1971). The Justice of Zeus. Sather Classical Lectures. Vol. 42. Berkeley: University of California Press. ISBN 0520017390.
- — (1975). Females of the Species: Semonides on Women. Illustrated by Marcelle Quinton. Park Ridge: Noyes. ISBN 0815550383.
- — (1978). Myths of the Zodiac. Illustrated by Marcelle Quinton. New York: St. Martin's Press. ISBN 0715614932.
- — (1980). Mythical Beasts. Illustrated by Marcelle Quinton. London: Duckworth. ISBN 0715614398.
- — (1982). Classical Survivals: The Classics in the Modern World. London: Duckworth. ISBN 0715615173.
- — (1983). Blood for the Ghosts: Classical Influences in the Nineteenth and Twentieth Centuries. Baltimore: Johns Hopkins University Press. ISBN 0801830176 – via Internet Archive.
- — (1990). Greek Comedy, Hellenistic Literature, Greek Religion, and Miscellanea: The Academic Papers of Sir Hugh Lloyd-Jones. Oxford: Oxford University Press. ISBN 0198147457.
- — (1990). Greek Epic, Lyric, and Tragedy: The Academic Papers of Sir Hugh Lloyd Jones. Oxford: Oxford University Press. ISBN 0198146809.
- —; Wilson, Nigel Guy (1990). Sophoclea: Studies on the Text of Sophocles. Oxford: Oxford University Press. ISBN 019814041X.
- —; Wilson, Nigel Guy, eds. (1990). Sophoclis Fabulae. Oxford Classical Texts. Oxford: Oxford University Press. ISBN 0198145772.
- — (1991). Greek in a Cold Climate. London: Duckworth. ISBN 0389209678 – via Internet Archive.
- —; Wilson, Nigel Guy (1997). Sophoclea: Sophocles: Second Thoughts. Hypomnemata. Vol. 100. Göttingen: Ruprecht. ISBN 3525252005.

Academic offices
Preceded by E. R. Dodds	Regius Professor of Greek; University of Oxford; 1960 to 1989	Succeeded by Peter J. Parsons
