= Classical Receptions Journal =

- Discipline: Classical studies
- Language: English
- Edited by: Pantelis Michelakis

Publication details
- Publisher: Oxford University Press (United Kingdom)

Standard abbreviations
- ISO 4: Class. Recept. J.

Indexing
- ISSN: 1759-5134 (print); 1759-5142 (web)

Links
- Journal homepage

The Classical Receptions Journal is a peer reviewed academic journal of reception studies, covering all aspects of the reception of the texts and material culture of ancient Greece and Rome from antiquity to the present day. It is published by Oxford University Press.
