= Golden Bough (Aeneid) =

Object in Virgil's "Aeneid"

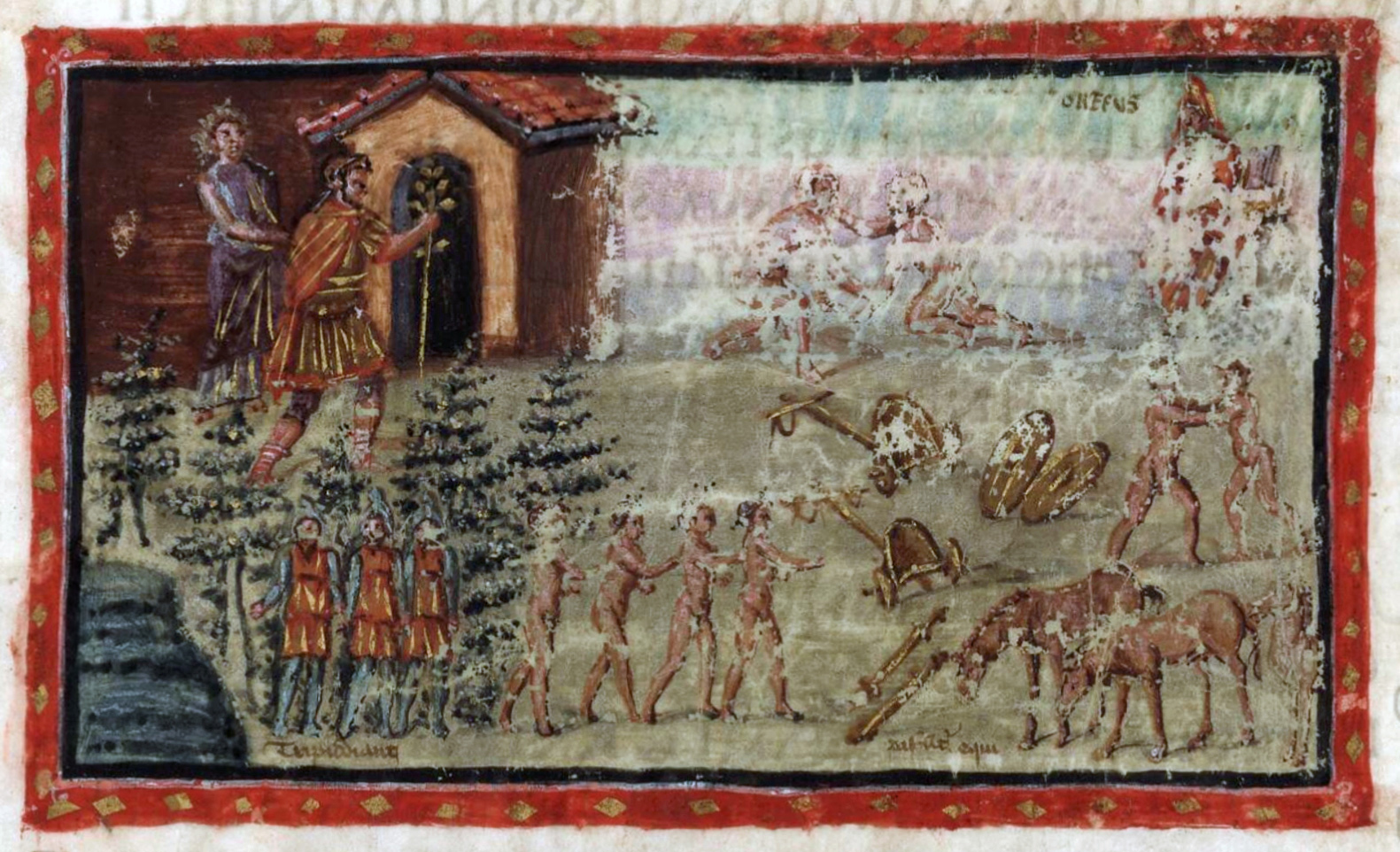
Aeneas, holding the Golden Bough, approaches the gates of Elysium in an illustration from the fourth-century AD Vergilius Vaticanus manuscript of the Aeneid.

The Golden Bough is a fantastical object described in the Aeneid, an epic poem by the Roman poet Virgil composed between 29 and 19 BC narrating the adventures of the Trojan hero Aeneas after the Trojan War. The episode of the Golden Bough is found in its sixth book and is part of Aeneas's journey into the Underworld. The bough itself acts as proof of Aeneas's divine favour, and allows him to pass into the Underworld. He is directed to find it in an expansive forest, which he accomplishes with the aid of his mother, the goddess Venus, and to remove it from its host tree. Although Aeneas has been told that it will come easily – if his journey is ordained by fate – Virgil describes the bough as briefly hesitating before he takes it.

Virgil's portrayal of the bough has no direct literary antecedents, though it draws on several precedents from literature, folklore and philosophy. Scholars have connected it with, among others, the Golden Fleece in the story of the Argonauts; symbolic objects associated with deities such as Hermes, Dionysus and Circe; and the branches carried by prospective initiates into the Eleusinian Mysteries, a Greek religious rite centred on a symbolic journey into the Underworld. Virgil associates it with both death and immortality, partly by way of symbolic associations in Graeco-Roman culture between gold and the gods. It also recalls ideas put forth by the Roman philosopher Lucretius as to the nature of the soul. The episode of the Golden Bough was parodied by authors including Virgil's contemporary Ovid, and drawn upon by later Roman poets including Lucan and Valerius Flaccus.

Early interpretations of the Golden Bough tended to give it an allegorical function, particularly via Pythagorean and Neoplatonist philosophy, which viewed it as symbolic of the choice between virtue and vice. Medieval commentators often considered it a symbol of wisdom, and several Christian theologians interpreted it as representing Christian wisdom and virtue. In the sixteenth century, it became a heraldic symbol of the Florentine House of Medici. Early modern receptions of the bough, including those of François Rabelais and Jonathan Swift, were often parodic or obscene. In the twentieth century, scholars following the Harvard School interpretation of the Aeneid argued that Virgil's use of the bough reflected his ambivalence towards Aeneas and the latter's mission to set in motion the rise of the Roman Empire. Other critics have highlighted echoes between the episode of the Golden Bough and the morally charged deaths of two of Aeneas's antagonists, Dido and Turnus.

In the fourth or fifth century AD, the commentator Servius connected the bough to the rex Nemorensis, a priest of the goddess Diana at Lake Nemi whose office was passed on by the killing of its holder. This equation influenced the anthropologist James George Frazer, who used the bough for the title of his 1890 work on comparative religion. The bough is recalled in Dante Alighieri's Divine Comedy and was the subject of an 1834 painting by J. M. W. Turner, which was used as the frontispiece for the early editions of Frazer's book. It was an influential motif in the "Byzantium" poems of W. B. Yeats and in the poetry of Seamus Heaney, who made several translations of Virgil's account of the episode. Scholars have also drawn parallels between the Golden Bough and significant objects in the novels of J. R. R. Tolkien.

== In Virgil's Aeneid ==
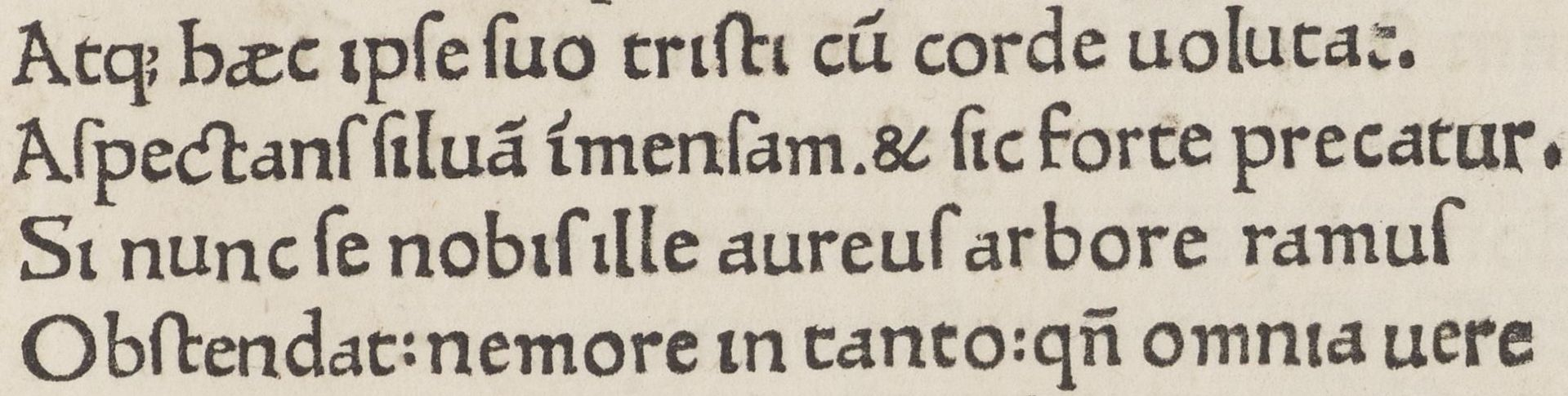
In Aeneid 6.185–188 (from the 1469 editio princeps), Aeneas prays that the Golden Bough might show itself in the deep wood.

The Aeneid, an epic poem composed by the Roman poet Virgil between 29 and 19 BC, narrates the journey of Aeneas, a Trojan survivor of the Trojan War, to the land of Italy. Aeneas was considered to be the ancestor of the gens Iulia, the aristocratic family of the emperor Augustus. (Note: Known as "Octavian" until 27 BCE.) Virgil's poetic career was supported by Maecenas, Augustus's lieutenant, and the Aeneid establishes Aeneas as prefiguring and paralleling Augustus.

When he reaches Italy, Aeneas travels to Cumae to meet the Sibyl, the holder of an oracular priesthood featuring in Greek mythology and associated with the prophetic Sibylline Books held in Rome during the historical period. Virgil's portrayal of the Sibyl, cast as a priestess of Apollo and of Diana Trivia, (Note: Under the epithet Trivia (lit. 'of the three ways'), the goddess Diana was associated with the Underworld and the dead.) draws upon Roman beliefs about witches, and also creates parallels between her and the persona adopted by the poet. She prophesies to Aeneas about his own future and that of his Roman descendants, gives him instructions on how to make his journey to the Underworld (his katabasis), and escorts him there to seek the shade of his father, Anchises. (Note: In Roman religion, the souls of the dead were considered to travel to the Underworld and join the shades, or manes. The precise nature of these shades is expressed differently by different Roman authors: they are often held to be somewhat divine.)

Before entering the Underworld, the Sibyl tells Aeneas he must first bury Misenus, a comrade of his who has recently died, and also obtain the Golden Bough which grows in a grove nearby. This bough must be given as an offering to Proserpina, (Note: Known in Greek as Persephone.) the queen of the Underworld, to indicate that Aeneas's visit is approved by fate and divine sanction. It grows from a shaded tree in a dark grove, itself concealed in a dark valley. (Note: Fratantuono 2007, pp. 170–171; Virgil, Aeneid 6.133–148.) When Aeneas arrives at the wood, he finds it to be immense in size and the task of finding the bough apparently impossible: his mother, the goddess Venus, sends two doves to aid him, and they direct him to the tree's location near Lake Avernus, where Aeneas takes it from the tree. (Note: Fratantuono 2007, pp. 171–172; Virgil, Aeneid 6.183–204.) Virgil describes the bough as cunctantem ('hesitating') as Aeneas attempts to remove it from its tree: this follows the Sibyl's pronouncement that the bough would "come easily of its own accord", if Aeneas's journey were ordained by fate.

The Trojans, led by Corynaeus, carry out the funerary rites for Misenus, allowing Aeneas to start his descent into the Underworld. When the two reach the River Styx, the Sibyl shows the Golden Bough to the ferryman Charon, who only then allows them to enter his boat and cross into the Underworld proper. (Note: Fratantuono 2007, pp. 173, 177; Virgil, Aeneid 6.384–416.) Aeneas and the Sibyl move through the Underworld, seeing the shades of the dead as well as the punishments meted out in Tartarus. Aeneas places the Golden Bough on the threshold of the Elysian Fields, the home of the just, (Note: Fratantuono 2007, p. 183; Virgil, Aeneid 6.628–636.) where he meets his father. (Note: Fratantuono 2007, pp. 185–186; Virgil, Aeneid 6.679–702.)

=== Antecedents and possible inspiration ===
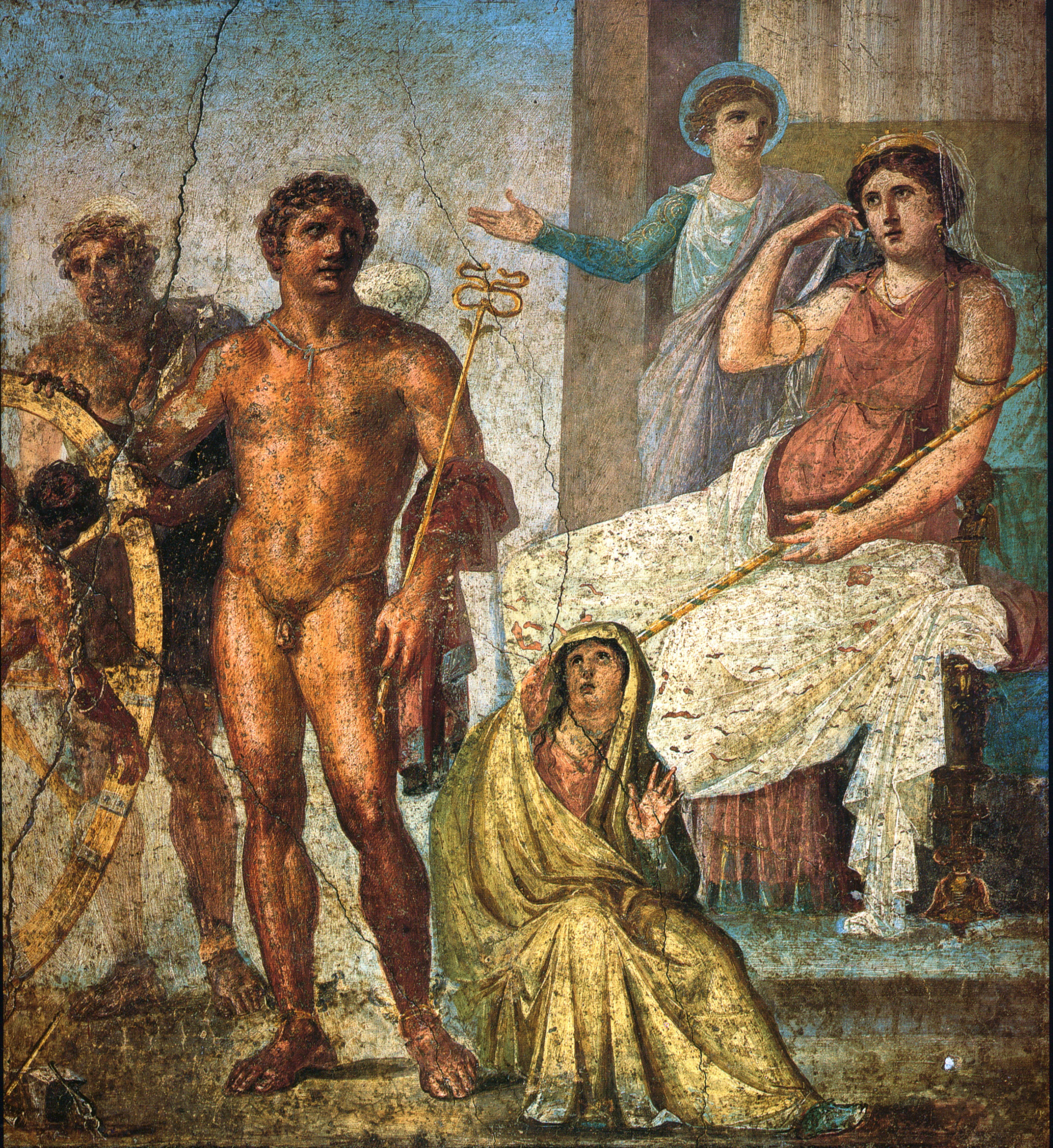
Roman fresco from Pompeii, c. 79 AD. Mercury (the Roman equivalent of Hermes; centre) holding the caduceus, a possible antecedent for the Golden Bough. Ixion, tied to a wheel for punishment, is on the left. (Note: For the painting and the identification of the figures in it, see Simon & Bauchhenss 1992, p. 530.)

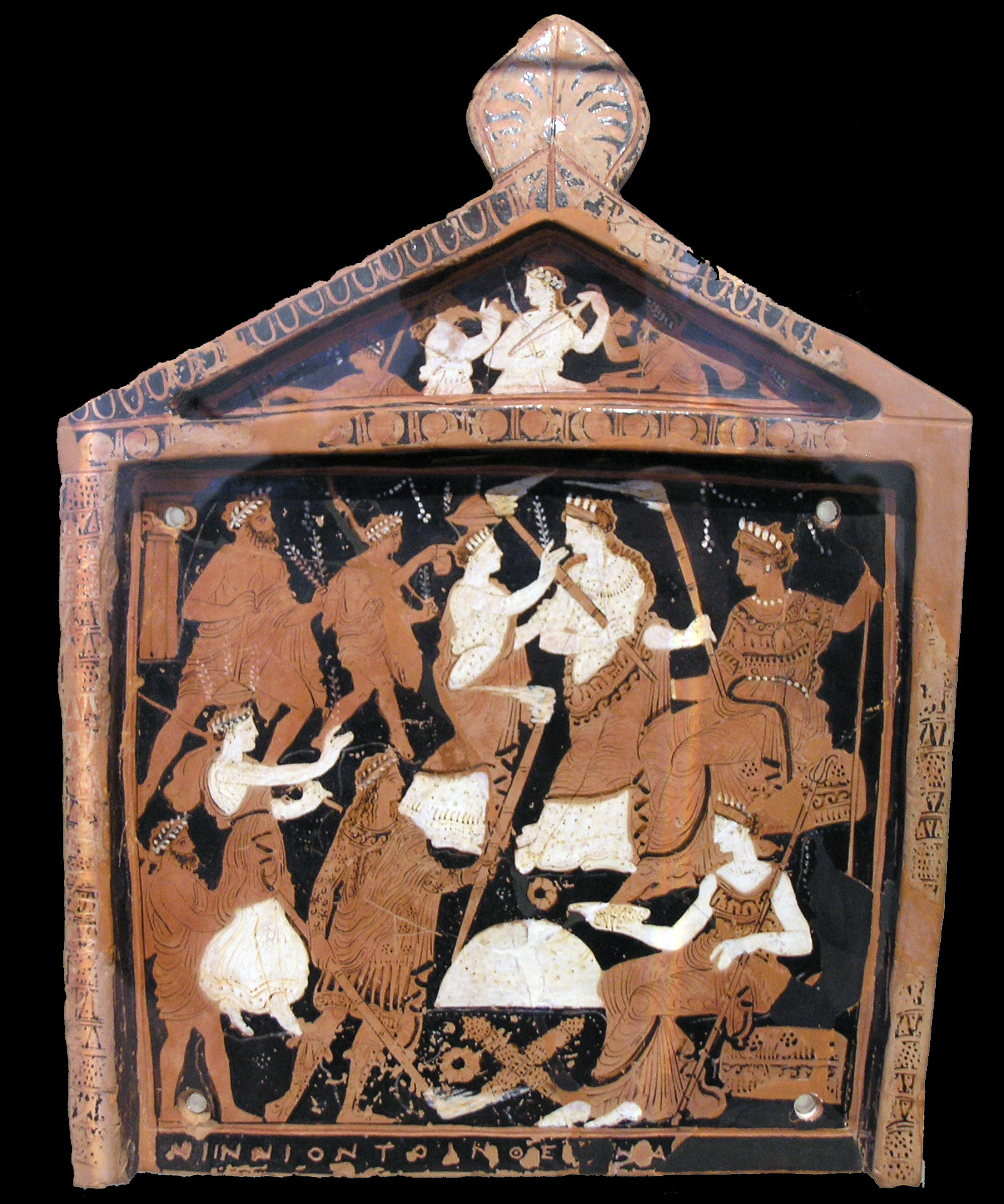
The Ninnion Tablet, dedicated at Eleusis as a votive offering around 370 BC, shows initiates into the Eleusinian Mysteries approaching Persephone and Demeter, boughs in hand.

Virgil's treatment of the Golden Bough merges folkloric, philosophical and literary precedents. However, it has no direct antecedents, and some early critics, such as the mid–first century AD commentator Lucius Annaeus Cornutus, considered the episode to have been entirely Virgil's invention. Raymond J. Clark connects the bough with the caduceus, the golden staff carried by the god Hermes, among whose roles was to escort the souls of the dead to the Underworld. (Note: Clark 1979, p. 217, cited in Horsfall 2013, p. 153.) In the Odyssey and Homeric Hymns, both composed in Ancient Greek around the eighth–seventh centuries BC, Hermes is given the epithet khrusorrhapis (χρυσόρραπις, 'the one with the golden rod'). (Note: Nagy 2018, p. 34 (for the Odyssey and the translation); Romano 2025, p. 84 (for the Homeric Hymns).) Nicholas Horsfall suggests that the Golden Bough may equally echo the golden wand of Circe in the Odyssey, the golden sceptres carried by the shades of Tiresias and Minos in the same poem, or the fig-branch, carved in the shape of a phallus, placed on the tomb of Prosymnus by the god Dionysus. (Note: Horsfall 2013, p. 153. For the story of Dionysus and Prosymnus, see Käppel 2008, col. 61.) Damien Nelis suggests that Virgil's Golden Bough episode echoes the narrative of the Greek hero Jason and the Argonauts; Jason is guided through the Clashing Rocks by a dove, and ultimately obtains the Golden Fleece which, like the bough, is found in an oak grove. (Note: Nelis 2001, pp. 240–241, cited in Bremmer 2009, p. 199.) Adrian Pârvulescu observes that none of these potential antecedents share the essential function of Virgil's Golden Bough, namely, to allow the bearer passage or to demonstrate their moral virtue.

Jan Bremmer suggests that the bough recalls the branches of myrtle carried by prospective initiates into the Eleusinian Mysteries, a mystery religion of ancient Attica centred on the myth of Proserpina and a symbolic descent into the Underworld. (Note: Virgil's patron, the emperor Augustus, was an initiate into the Mysteries, and Bremmer elsewhere writes that Aeneas's journey into the Underworld parallels Augustus's initiation into them.) It may thus also allude to a Descent of Herakles, a lost poem in a tradition of works narrating the journey of the hero Herakles to the Underworld during the last of his twelve labours, since Herakles was first initiated into the Eleusinian Mysteries. Agnes Michels suggests that Virgil may have been inspired by the first-century BC poet Meleager, whose poetic anthology The Garland included a reference to "the ever-golden branch of divine Plato shining all round with virtue". (Note: Michels 1945, pp. 59–63, cited in Bremmer 2009, p. 199.)

Charles Segal connects the bough, via its close association with the death of Misenus, to the folkloric motif of another's death being required for a hero to enter the Underworld, as in the case of that of Elpenor in the Odyssey. Ancient Greek and Roman culture connected gold with the divine, particularly the Olympian gods, and with the world of the dead, particularly via the chthonic deities Persephone (known as Proserpina in Latin) and Demeter (known in Latin as Ceres). It was also associated with immortality.

In the fourth or fifth century AD, the commentator Servius connected the bough to the institution of the rex Nemorensis (or "king of the grove"), a priest of the goddess Diana at Lake Nemi. The title of rex Nemorensis was passed on by the killing of its current holder. To challenge the priest for his office, a contender had to break off a branch from the grove of trees around the sanctuary, an act which was otherwise forbidden. Domizio Calderini and Pietro Crinito, two scholars of the Italian Renaissance, (Note: Crinitio lived from 1474 until 1507.) suggested that the Golden Bough should be identified as mistletoe, with which Virgil compares it in a simile. They therefore saw it as a reference to the ritual use of that plant by druids in ancient Celtic religion. This interpretation was taken up by James Sowerby in his 1805 work English Botany, and through this influenced the anthropologist James George Frazer in choosing the bough for the title of his 1890 volume on comparative religion and ritual.

== Interpretation ==
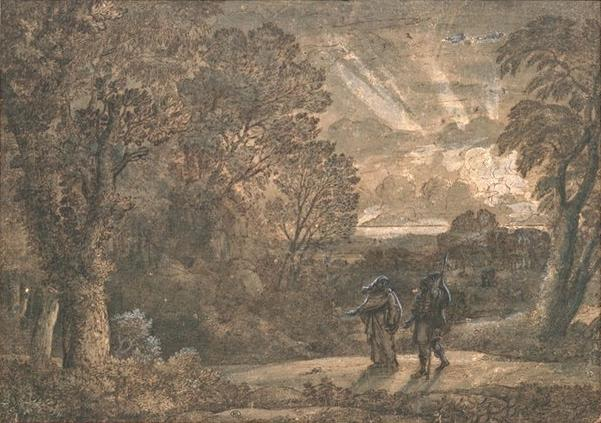
Deiphobe Leading Aeneas in the Underworld, Claude Lorrain, c. 1673

Anthony Ossa-Richardson calls the Golden Bough "the central detail of the central book of what was, from late antiquity to the end of the Renaissance, the most significant and prestigious work of pagan literature in Western Europe". In Horsfall's formulation, it acts as a sort of talisman to grant Aeneas safe passage through the Underworld, perhaps analogous to the diploma carried by Roman travellers on official business, or the moly given to Odysseus by Hermes to protect him from Circe's magic in the Odyssey. (Note: Horsfall 2013, p. 156. On the diploma, see Mitchell 1976, pp. 125–126.) Pârvulescu sees it as a mirror of the suppliant branch or herald's staff, used in Greek and Roman antiquity as a sign of truce and good intentions between emissaries from warring parties. Clifford Weber sees the bough as mirroring the understanding of the soul put forth by the Roman philosopher Lucretius; Lucretius compared the soul and body with mistletoe entwined with a tree, and several phrases and ideas used by Lucretius to refer to the soul echo in Virgil's description of the Golden Bough.

Servius attempted to discredit readings of the Golden Bough's hesitation which suggested that it may imply that Aeneas is not truly favoured or endorsed by the gods. Richard F. Thomas argues that Servius's attempts to suppress this interpretation indicate that it was already current by the time of his commentary. Weber links the bough's hesitation to Lucretian metaphysics, in which the soul is tightly bound to the body and not easily separated from it. He similarly connects the bough with the golden lock of hair emphasised during the death of the Carthaginian queen Dido in Book 4 of the Aeneid: the severing of Dido's lock causes her death, just as Aeneas's breaking of the Golden Bough initiates the symbolic death represented by his journey into the Underworld. The word cunctantem recurs at several points in the poem, including at its climax, when Aeneas hesitates before deciding to kill his defeated enemy Turnus; Anthony J. Boyle interprets this as a recurring motif by which "opposition is overcome by violence, passion, mindlessness and furor". (Note: The Latin word furor referred to madness and irrationality: see Hardie 2016, pp. 4–5.) Joseph Farrell sees the motif as indicating the impossibility of choosing a "third way" between the poem's stark binary ethical choices. In relation to the apparent difficulty of interpreting the bough's hesitation, David West sees Virgil as employing the "Excalibur motif" of a talismanic object that will readily acquiesce to the chosen hero, as in the Sibyl's words to Aeneas. West views Aeneas's display of force in removing the bough as a means of emphasising his strength and boldness. (Note: Fowler 1989, p. 104, citing West 1987, p. 4.)

From the late seventeenth century, scholars began to analyse the Golden Bough as evidence for Virgil's biography, and to conjecture potential motivations for including it in the poem. The Danish scholar Ole Borch, in a 1688 dissertation on the history of chemistry, suggested that the bough's nature implied Virgil's familiarity with the principles of alchemy. In 1724, the English geologist John Beaumont suggested that Virgil had himself visited Cumae and been guided through its subterranean passages by a Sibyl.

=== Allegorical and metaphorical interpretations ===
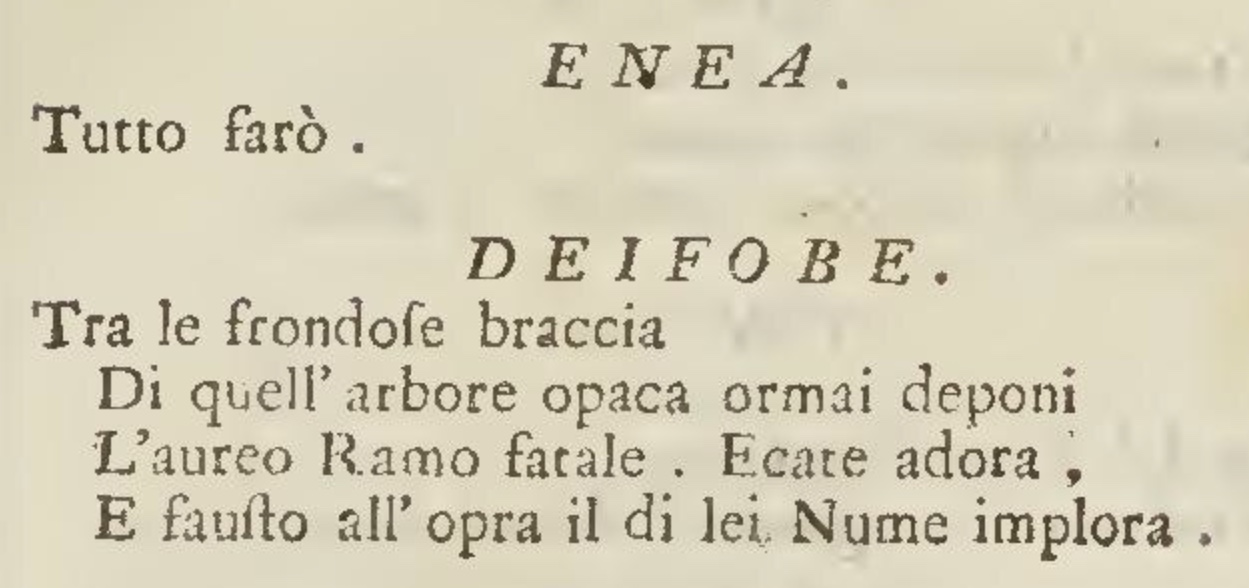
In Pietro Metastasio's operatic libretto Enea negli Elisi, first set to music by Johann Joseph Fux in 1731, Aeneas receives instruction from Deiphobe as to the bough.

Servius interpreted the Golden Bough as an allegory of the Pythagorean view of human life, by which the shape of the branch was intended to recall the Y-shaped path Pythagoras considered open to human beings upon coming of age: the choice between a life of vice and one of virtue. Christian Patristic writers such as Lactantius, who lived during the third and fourth centuries AD, used the Golden Bough in their discussion of the bivium, the "choice of two paths" between virtue and vice. In the Christian commentary of Fulgentius, written around 500 AD, the taking of the Golden Bough is interpreted as an allegory for the acquisition of scholarly and literary knowledge. Fulgentius argues that the bough's golden nature was intended by Virgil to imply "the splendour of eloquence".

Two medieval groups of Neoplatonist Christian scholars followed Servius in writing allegorical interpretations of the Golden Bough aligned with Platonic thought. One group, based in Chartres (or possibly Paris) in France, was active in the mid–twelfth century. It included Bernardus Silvestris, who concurred with Servius's interpretation of the bough as representing human beings' Y-shaped moral choice, and added that the image of a tree echoed that of a human body "shady with the heaviness of the flesh". He extensively allegorised the episode of the bough, arguing that its wood represents sin, that the Y-shaped branch stands for the division of philosophy into its theoretical and practical branches, and that the golden nature of the bough marked that both branches were constitutive of wisdom. Bernardus's approximate contemporary, John of Salisbury, made a similar argument in which the bough stood for the "virtuous effort" necessary to acquire wisdom. The second group, based in fifteenth-century Florence, also treated the bough as symbolic of philosophical wisdom, making little addition to the interpretation put forward by Servius. These scholars included Coluccio Salutati, Cristoforo Landino and Marsilio Ficino; Ficino interpreted the bough as "the light of reason" granted by divine mercy.

Virgil remained popular among Christian readers from late antiquity into the medieval period, and several commentators, such as the second–third-century theologian Tertullian, considered his work Christian in spirit. Other Christian commentators on the Aeneid interpreted the Golden Bough as representing Christian doctrines. An anonymous marginal note in a twelfth-century manuscript of the poem stated that the bough stood for either "the virtues by which men ... are carried to the heavens" or "the riches which cast many men down to hell". (Note: Baswell 1995, p. 107; Haynes 2021, p. 56. The manuscript is known as MS Cambridge, Peterhouse College 158.) The commentary on Virgil attributed to the biblical scholar Anselm of Laon, written in the eleventh or twelfth centuries, followed Servius's interpretation of the bough as representing moral choices; one manuscript of this commentary interprets the bough's many leaves as representing the many forms of lust. In a theological work of 1497, the Carmelite humanist Baptista Mantuanus interpreted Virgil's bough as a prefiguration of the Christian faith needed for entry into Heaven, corresponding to the Roman conception of the Elysian Fields. Similarly, he extended a metaphor common in fifteenth-century humanist scholarship, originating with Poliziano, to argue that the forest in which the bough was found corresponded to unfinished scholarly work, and therefore equated Aeneas's search for the bough with a humanist's search for truth within academic material. By further extension, he presented the bough as an exhortation to fellow Carmelites to find Christian doctrine and wisdom in pre-Christian classical texts. In the early sixteenth century, the theologian Giles of Viterbo argued that the Golden Bough's apparent compatibility with Christian doctrine indicated that Virgil had been familiar with the Old Testament of the Christian Bible, therefore qualifying the Aeneid as a sacred Christian text.

Commentaries made on the Aeneid throughout the sixteenth and seventeenth centuries, including those of Erasmus, Juan Luis de la Cerda, Jacobus Pontanus, Friedrich Taubmann, John Boys and Charles de la Rue, largely followed Servius's approach. An exception was that of Francis Bacon, who saw the taking of the bough as an allegory for the act of harnessing the natural power or life-force Bacon believed to be imprisoned beneath the earth. In Geoffroy Tory's 1529 Champ fleury, a treatise on typography and grammar, a numerological argument is developed by which the Golden Bough has twenty-three leaves (since Virgil describes it in, by Tory's reckoning, twenty-three verses) corresponding to the twenty-three letters of the alphabet. (Note: The Latin alphabet, as used in the classical period and taught in early-modern Latin schools, had twenty-three letters (omitting j and w, and making no distinction between u and v). The critics José Bouman and Frans Janssen point out that "some stretching of the original text" is required to arrive at the figure of twenty-three lines.) Such allegorical readings had largely fallen from favour by the early eighteenth century: Antoine Banier described them as "the fruit of poets' imagination" in 1724. An anonymous pamphlet, published in London in 1697, listed the bough among Virgil's "faults against Probability".

=== Harvard School ===
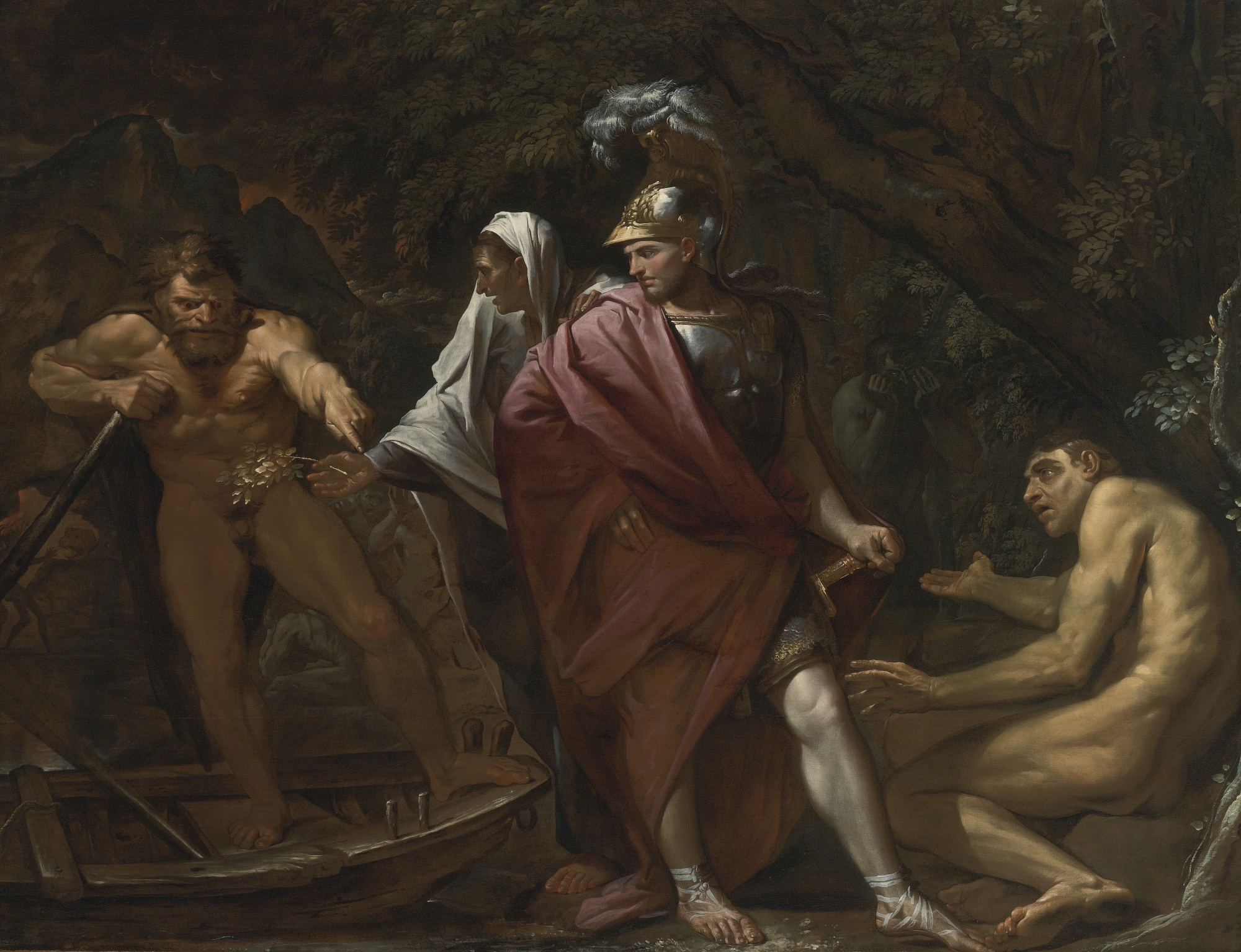
Aeneas on the Bank of the River Styx, painted by Pietro Testa between 1648 and the artist's suicide in 1650

In modern scholarship, ambivalent readings of the Golden Bough episode are characteristic of the Harvard School, a school of thought that attempts to trace pessimistic or anti-Augustan messages in the Aeneid and sees Aeneas as a flawed hero. R. A. Brooks's 1953 article "Discolor aura: Reflections on the Golden Bough", often considered the first work of the school, argued that previous commentators had neglected the symbolic and suggestive aspects of the Golden Bough episode. Brooks considers it to highlight Aeneas's ignorance of the full implications of his destiny, the distorted and ambiguous nature of Virgil's language, and Aeneas's inability to achieve a final state of success. Adam Parry, a prominent member of the Harvard School, describes the bough as "a symbol of splendor and lifelessness".

Charles Segal, another member of the Harvard School, discusses the discrepancy between the Sibyl's instructions to Aeneas – that the bough will "come easily of its own accord", if Aeneas's journey is ordained by fate – and what occurs when he grasps the bough: it momentarily resists him. He argues that the episode's incidental nature to the plot of the Aeneid, as well as the close proximity of the instructions and the bough's resistance, suggests that Virgil intended the discrepancy and that it is significant to the poem. He sees Aeneas's taking of the bough as "a symbolical anticipation of the rude loss of innocence" that awaits the land of Italy, and more generally indicative of the poem's "divided attitude to the destiny of Rome and the cost of empire". Elsewhere, he writes that the bough is closely associated with death, a connection made through its juxtaposition with mentions of the recently dead Misenus, and other references to death and the afterlife. He argues, therefore, that it serves to unite the stories of Misenus, Palinurus (another of Aeneas's comrades killed at sea) and Daedalus as narrated in the Aeneid.

== Reception ==
=== In antiquity ===
Aeneas and the Golden Bough, from an engraving by Samuel Lysons of a mosaic pavement found near Frampton in England

The story of the Golden Bough is retold in the fourteenth book of the Metamorphoses, a long mythological poem composed by Virgil's contemporary Ovid around 8 AD. Ovid compresses the Virgilian account of the story such that the Sibyl presents the bough to Aeneas immediately, rather than having him search for it; (Note: Musgrove 2000, p. 184, commenting on Ovid, Metamorphoses 14.113–115.) Philip Hardie calls his treatment of the scene "an afterthought". The bough is also recalled in Book 11 of the Metamorphoses, where Midas (given the power to turn anything he touches into gold) picks a branch from an oak tree and magically transforms it. Hardie calls this episode a parody of Virgil, whereas Joseph D. Reed sees it as illustrating Midas's status as an initiate, having recently been transformed by being granted miraculous power.

The Roman poet Lucan composed his Bellum civile, an epic on the theme of the civil war of the 40s BC between Julius Caesar and Pompey, under the emperor Nero around the first half of the 60s AD. In Book 6 of the Bellum civile, Sextus Pompey seeks the aid of the Thessalian witch Erichtho; his journey to her cave is likened to one into the Underworld. Lucan's poem combines the two conditions placed upon Aeneas's entry to the Underworld – the search for the Golden Bough and the burial of Misenus's corpse – by having Erichtho search for a corpse with which to carry out a necromantic ritual. Susan H. Braund calls this "a shocking, black, pessimistic version of a stirring, patriotic episode in the Aeneid", and as a sign of Lucan's artistic debt to Virgil, if not of personal antipathy towards his work.

The Roman poet Valerius Flaccus wrote the Argonautica, a Latin poem on the subject of Jason and the Argonauts, probably in the 70s AD. Several references in the poem associate the emperor Vespasian (r. 69 – 79 AD) with the hero Jason, and both figures with Virgil's Aeneas: John Penwill has argued that Valerius's Golden Fleece, acquired physically by Jason and symbolically by Vespasian, can also be understood as an allegory for the Golden Bough, and thereby as part of Valerius's legitimation of the emperor's claim to rule. (Note: The classicist Raymond Marks suggests that, by evoking a passage of Ovid's Epistulae ex Ponto in which the poet compares Jason's voyage with his own exile in Tomis, Valerius associates Ovid's exile with the hero's journey.) The Golden Ass, a novel written in Latin by the Numidian-born author Apuleius in the mid–second century CE, includes an episode where Psyche, as part of trials necessary to regain the trust of her husband Cupid, must collect the wool of a ferocious golden sheep: Apuleius makes several allusions via wordplay to Virgil's narrative of the Golden Bough, as well as to Ovid's account of the Midas myth.

The late antique Christian poet Faltonia Betitia Proba composed the Cento Vergilianus de laudibus Christi, a rearrangement of Virgil's poems to tell the story of the life of Christ, in the fourth century AD. In her reformulation, the verses concerning the Golden Bough are repurposed to refer to the Tree of Knowledge in the Garden of Eden from the Book of Genesis. A mosaic pavement made at a Roman villa near Frampton in the English county of Dorset in the mid–fourth century AD depicts Aeneas taking the Golden Bough. Anthony A. Barrett sees this as a relatively rare indication of detailed knowledge of classical literature in late antique Britain, as well as potential evidence for belief in mystery religions centred on entry to the Underworld.

=== Medieval ===
The anonymous Roman d'Enéas, an Old French romance composed around 1160, retells the episode of Aeneas and the Golden Bough in terms that largely match Virgil's account; echoing the Aeneid, the bough is impervious to steel, will regrow after being broken, and the god Jupiter will allow only select heroes to take it. In this version, Aeneas finds the bough himself, without mention of Venus or her doves. The Roman d'Enéas slightly modifies Virgil's portrayal of the bough, making the Sibyl declare to Aeneas that it is essential to allow him safe return from the Underworld; a similar approach was adopted by the Eneas Romance, an adaptation of the Roman d'Enéas made by Heinrich von Veldeke at the end of the twelfth century. (Note: Groos 1995, p. 151. On the date of Veldeke's Eneas Romance, see Ziolkowski 2004, p. 678.) In the Middle High German romance Parzival, composed by Wolfram von Eschenbach probably in the first quarter of the fourteenth century, the retinue of the Grail King obtain the Golden Bough as one of several protections against a poisoned weapon used by a heathen knight.

Other medieval treatments of the Golden Bough drew more directly on allegorical interpretations made by contemporary theologians. (Note: See § Allegorical and metaphorical interpretations.) In the Anticlaudianus, an allegorical poem probably written around the 1140s, Alain de Lille depicts a golden chariot, driven by Prudence, in terms recalling Virgil's Golden Bough as portrayed in the ancient and medieval allegorical tradition. Its components correspond to the subjects of the trivium and quadrivium, the areas of a medieval liberal education; Justin Haynes argues that Alain therefore develops the longstanding interpretation of the Golden Bough as a symbol of knowledge to associate it specifically with the subjects of the medieval curriculum. In the Architrenius, a satirical poem written around 1184 by John of Hauville, the place of the Golden Bough in the title character's katabasis is taken by the philosophical education he receives from the University of Paris.

In the Inferno, the first part of the fourteenth-century Divine Comedy written by the Florentine poet Dante Alighieri, Dante's eponymous narrator begins his journey into the Christian Hell from a "dark wood" (selva oscura), which recalls the similarly dark wood in which Aeneas discovers the Golden Bough; Virgil himself appears to guide Dante through Hell. Later in the Comedy, before entering Purgatory, Virgil binds Dante's cloak with a reed, which the Dantean scholar John Kleiner considers both to recall Virgil's Golden Bough and to cast the latter as "brittle and gilded" by comparison with its Christian equivalent; Gerhard Burian Ladner calls the reed-as-bough "an integral part of a whole ideology of spiritual renewal" expressed through similar symbols in Dante's work.

=== Early modern ===
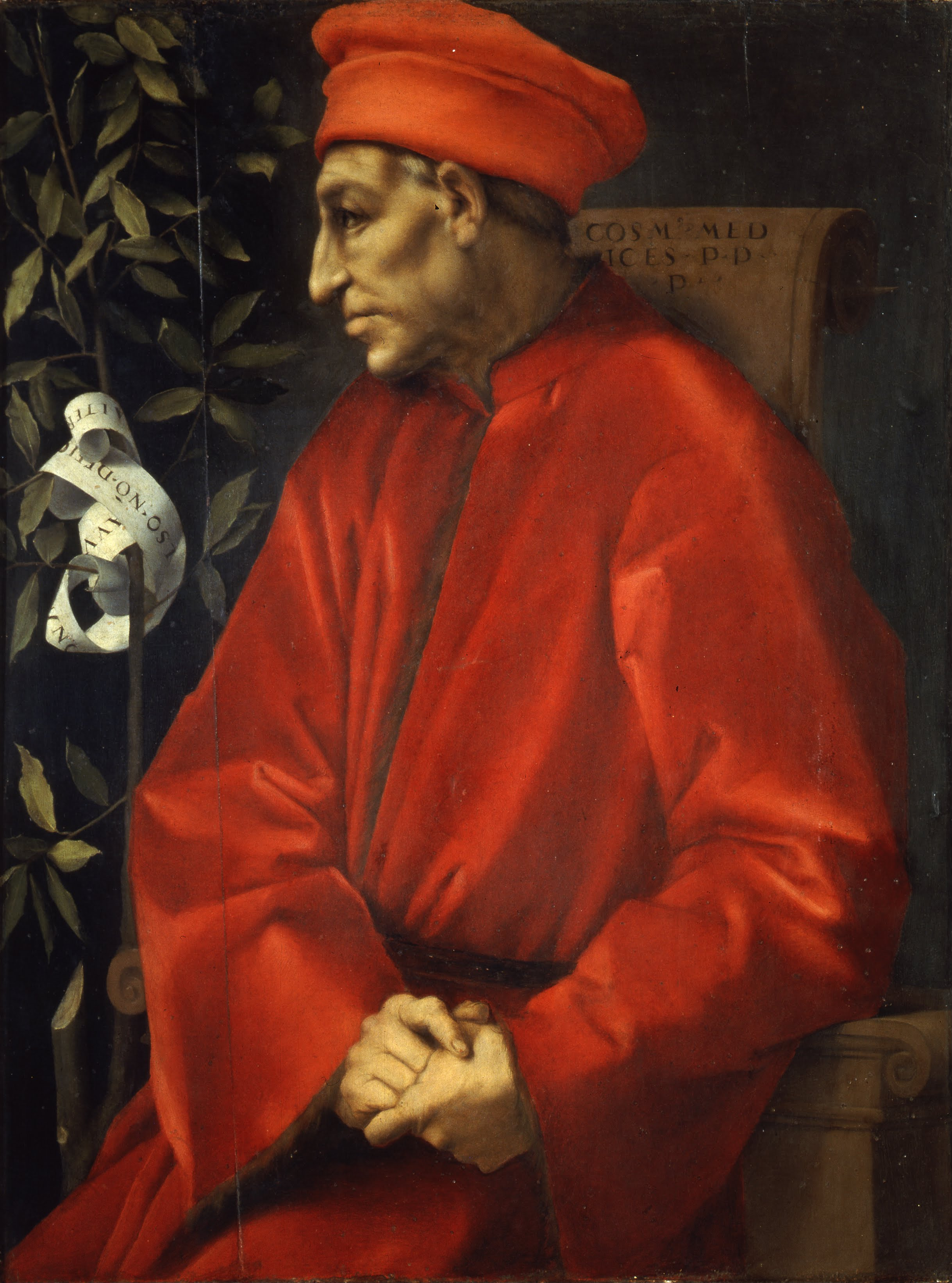
Pontormo's portrait of Cosimo de' Medici, including a Virgilian quotation originally referring to the Golden Bough

Under the name of the broncone ('bough'), the Golden Bough became in the sixteenth century an important heraldic device for the Medici family of early modern Florence. A portrait of the Florentine lord Cosimo de' Medici (Cosimo the Elder), painted by Pontormo in 1518–1519 under the rule of Cosimo's grandson Lorenzo II de' Medici, included a scroll entwined around a laurel branch reading uno avulso non deficit alter ("when one is plucked, another comes forth"), a slight variation of part of the Sibyl's instructions to Aeneas about the Golden Bough. (Note: Hanning 2025, p. 231; Virgil, Aeneid 6.143. The Aeneid quotation begins primo avulso ....) The portrait was commissioned by Pope Leo X, a member of the Medici family, and painted in the house of his relative, Ottaviano de' Medici. The cultural scholar Barbara Russano Hanning interprets its Virgilian quotation as an assertion that there would always be future members of the Medici family ready to succeed to power in Florence. (Note: The art historian Janet Cox-Rearick interprets Cosimo's change from primo ("when the first...") to uno ("when one...") as generalising the motto, to imply that further members of the Medici family would follow indefinitely from Cosimo just as he had succeeded his father, Giovanni di Bicci de' Medici.) After being elected Duke of Florence in 1537, Cosimo I de' Medici chose as the motto for his impresa (heraldic badge) the quotation primo avulso non deficit alter aureus ("as soon as one is plucked, another golden one comes forth"). (Note: Ladner 1983, p. 730; Virgil, Aeneid 6.143–144. For Cosimo's date of accession, see D'Arista 2021, p. 77.) (Note: Cosimo the Elder may have used a similar impresa with an orange tree and a similar Virgilian quotation.) This allusion to the bough signalled continuity with his relative, Alessandro de' Medici, the previous Duke of Florence, whose assassination had sparked Cosimo I's rise to power.

In Alexander Ross's 1638 Virgilii evangelisantis christiados libri XIII, a retelling of the Old Testament and the life of Christ in Virgilian Latin, the Golden Bough is used to stand in for the olive branch given to Noah to indicate the end of the Great Flood. Ross, following the Neoplatonists, also calls the bough "a bough of divine eloquence ... Christ brought us". Other early modern receptions were parodic or obscene. In François Rabelais's 1546 Tiers Livre, the bough is substituted for payment to the under-nourished Sibylle: smoked tongues, wine, a ram's scrotum full of coins, and a golden verge. The word verge usually meant "ring" in sixteenth-century French, but could also mean "bough" or, with phallic connotations, "rod". The French poet Paul Scarron, in his Virgile travesti, a parodic burlesque composed between 1648 and 1649, satirically compared the lustre of the bough with that of the Jacobus or the Louis d'or, respectively English and French gold coins of his era. Another parody appeared in the 1672 Cataplus of Maurice Atkins, in which the glow of the bough was compared with that of glow-worms, frost, and the "frothy trash which sluggish snail / draws along the ground at tail". In Alexander Pope's 1712 mock-heroic poem The Rape of the Lock, the gnome Umbriel, on his own katabasis to the Cave of Spleen, bears "a branch of healing Spleenwort in his hand" as a counterpart to Aeneas's bough. In his 1730 poem A Panegyrick on the Dean, the English satirist Jonathan Swift compared the Golden Bough with a branch soaked by women urinating in the street. (Note: Gilmore 1976, p. 41. For the date of the poem, see Sherbo 1988, p. 244.)

=== Nineteenth century ===
==== By J. M. W. Turner ====
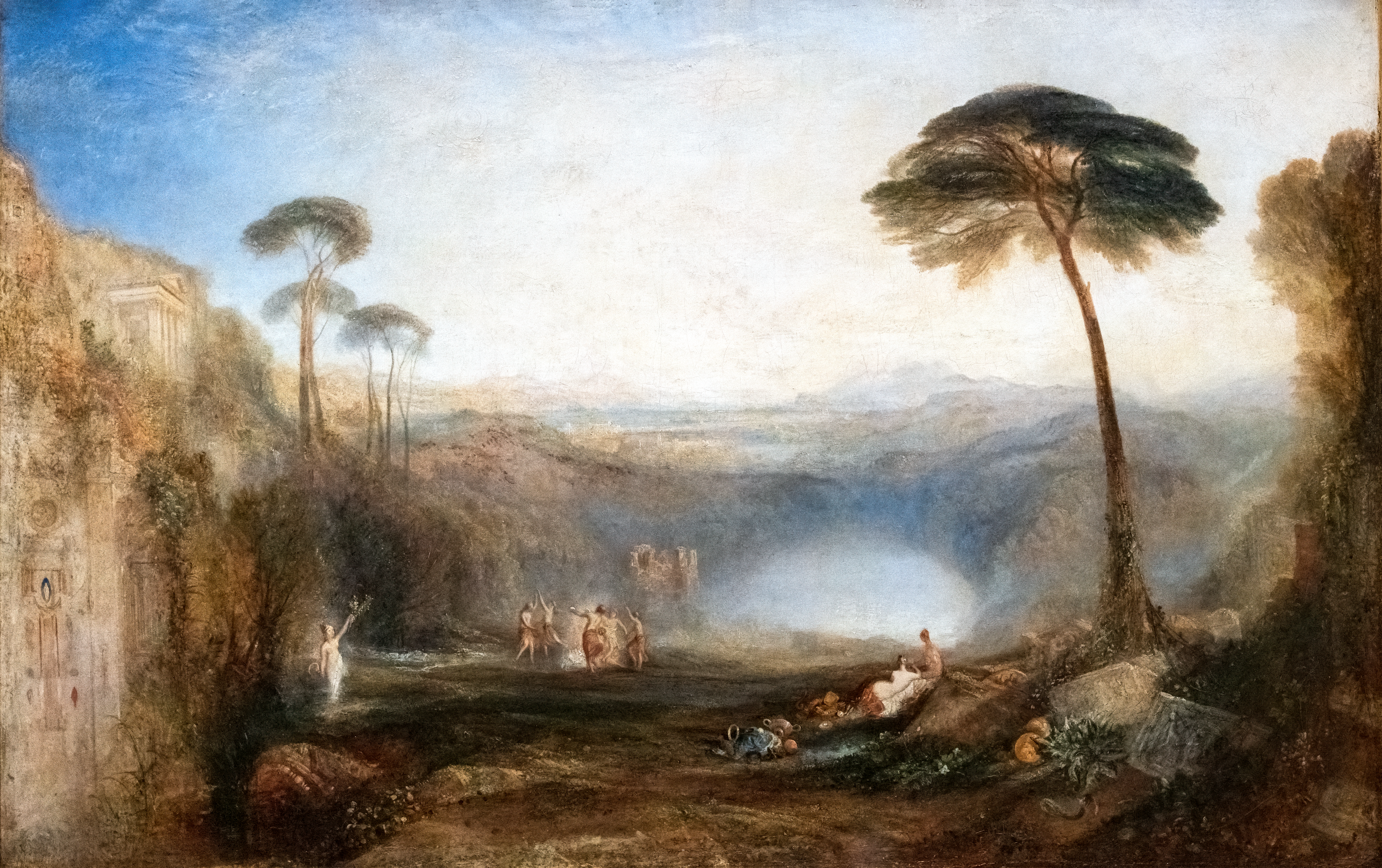
The Golden Bough (1834) by J. M. W. Turner

The English painter J. M. W. Turner painted several scenes based on Virgil's Aeneid, including Lake Avernus: Aeneas and the Cumaean Sibyl of 1814–1815. He painted the Sibyl again in 1823's The Bay of Baiae, to which his 1834 The Golden Bough was described by John Ruskin as a sequel. The Golden Bough was exhibited at the Royal Academy in 1834; its imagery was based on Turner's reading of Christopher Pitt's translation of Virgil. Unlike his previous paintings based on Aeneid 6, which were probably commissioned by the antiquarian Sir Richard Hoare, the decision to depict the Golden Bough seems to have been Turner's own. The art historian Eric Shanes suggests that Turner was inspired by the death of his father in 1829.

Turner's painting diverges from Virgil's narrative on several points: Aeneas is not present, though the Sibyl holds up the Golden Bough, which does not leave Aeneas's possession in the Aeneid after he removes it from the tree until he deposits it in the Underworld. The scene also depicts several half-naked dancers and two women, apparently watching them. They seem to ignore the bough itself; Shanes interprets this as a statement about the indifference of human beings, possibly towards religion or possibly towards art. He further describes the painting as a reflection on the discrepancy between the mortality of an artist and the immortality of art.

==== By James George Frazer ====
The Scottish anthropologist James George Frazer used the Golden Bough as the title for his 1890 work on comparative religion. Frazer took as axiomatic Servius's equation of the Virgilian bough with the branches in the grove of Diana at Nemi, and that the branch itself was of mistletoe. Frazer gave detailed instructions for the appearance of the book, which included a cover embossed with a design of golden mistletoe, commissioned from John Henry Middleton (the director of Cambridge's Fitzwilliam Museum), and Turner's The Golden Bough as the book's frontispiece.

In its first edition, Frazer described The Golden Bough as an effort to explain the rituals surrounding the grove of Nemi – specifically, to explain why the priesthood was passed on by the killing of its holder, and why the challenger had to first break off a branch from a tree. He argued for a parallel between the rex Nemorensis and the Norse god Baldr, whom Frazer considered to represent the spirit of the oak tree. Baldr is killed in mythology by a shaft of mistletoe, and Frazer therefore argued that both killings represent the preservation of the vital force of plant life, achieved by killing a person who embodies it before they can grow old and so cause the life-force to dissipate. These equations were largely invented by Frazer himself, and consist of little more than conjecture. From the third edition onwards, he downplayed the importance of Nemi and the Golden Bough to his work, instead arguing that it was merely a convenient preface to a broader discussion of comparative religion. In the editions printed after 1959, the Turner painting was removed.

=== Twentieth century ===
==== In poetry ====
In the first of The Cantos, his modernist poetic series composed from 1915 onwards, the American poet Ezra Pound refers to "the golden bough of Argicida". Argicida is the Latin rendering of Hermes's epithet Argeïphontes ('slayer of Argus') used by Georgius Dartona in his 1538 translation of the first Homeric Hymn to Aphrodite. (Note: Terrell 1980, pp. 3–4; Faulkner 2011, p.2, n. 3 (on Dartona's translation).) (Note: The Greek goddess Aphrodite was equated with the Roman goddess Venus.) According to Edgar M. Glenn, the triple allusion to Aphrodite, Hermes and the Aeneid reflects "that Pound wanted to convey the dark aspects of Aphrodite ... as well as the positive side", and to evoke Hermes's role as a guide of the dead to the Underworld.

In the Irish poet W. B. Yeats's 1927 "Sailing to Byzantium", the speaker imagines himself as a golden bird "set upon a golden bough to sing / To lords and ladies of Byzantium"; Jack Quin suggests that this may variously allude to Virgil, or to the receptions of his work by Turner and Frazer, or simply stand for a painted twig. (Note: Yeats knew Turner's painting, and spent long periods as a young man looking at it in London's National Gallery. On Turner, see § By J. M. W. Turner; on Frazer, § By James George Frazer.) In his 1930 "Byzantium", written in response to criticisms of that image made by his fellow poet Thomas Sturge Moore, Yeats invokes "the superhuman; / I call it death-in-life and life-in-death. / Miracle, bird or golden handiwork / ... Planted on the starlit golden bough". According to the critics Georg Roppen and Richard Sommer, Yeats draws upon the symbolic use of the Golden Bough in the Aeneid as representing the transition between life and death; they call it, for Yeats, "a threshold symbol – a passport into that purer and more perfect state of being into which the poet's soul will be born".

Yeats's countryman Seamus Heaney, who studied parts of the Aeneid as a child, made frequent use of the motif of the Golden Bough in his own poetry. According to the literary scholar Rachel Falconer, it inspired Heaney's depiction of a hazel divining rod in his early poem "The Diviner", first published in 1965 and included in his 1966 collection Death of a Naturalist. Heaney worked intensely on a translation of Aeneid 6 from at least 1986, following the death of his father. He worked on the Golden Bough episode continually from the mid-1980s, and published several versions of it throughout his life. The first was published in the journal Translation in 1989, and he included an abridged version of it as the first poem of his 1991 collection Seeing Things. Falconer suggests that this translation "underline[s] ... the significance of the golden bough motif at a crucial point in Heaney's career", and that Heaney connected it with the death of his mother in 1984 and that of his father in 1986. Heaney's translation of Aeneid 6 was published posthumously in 2016.

==== By J. R. R. Tolkien ====
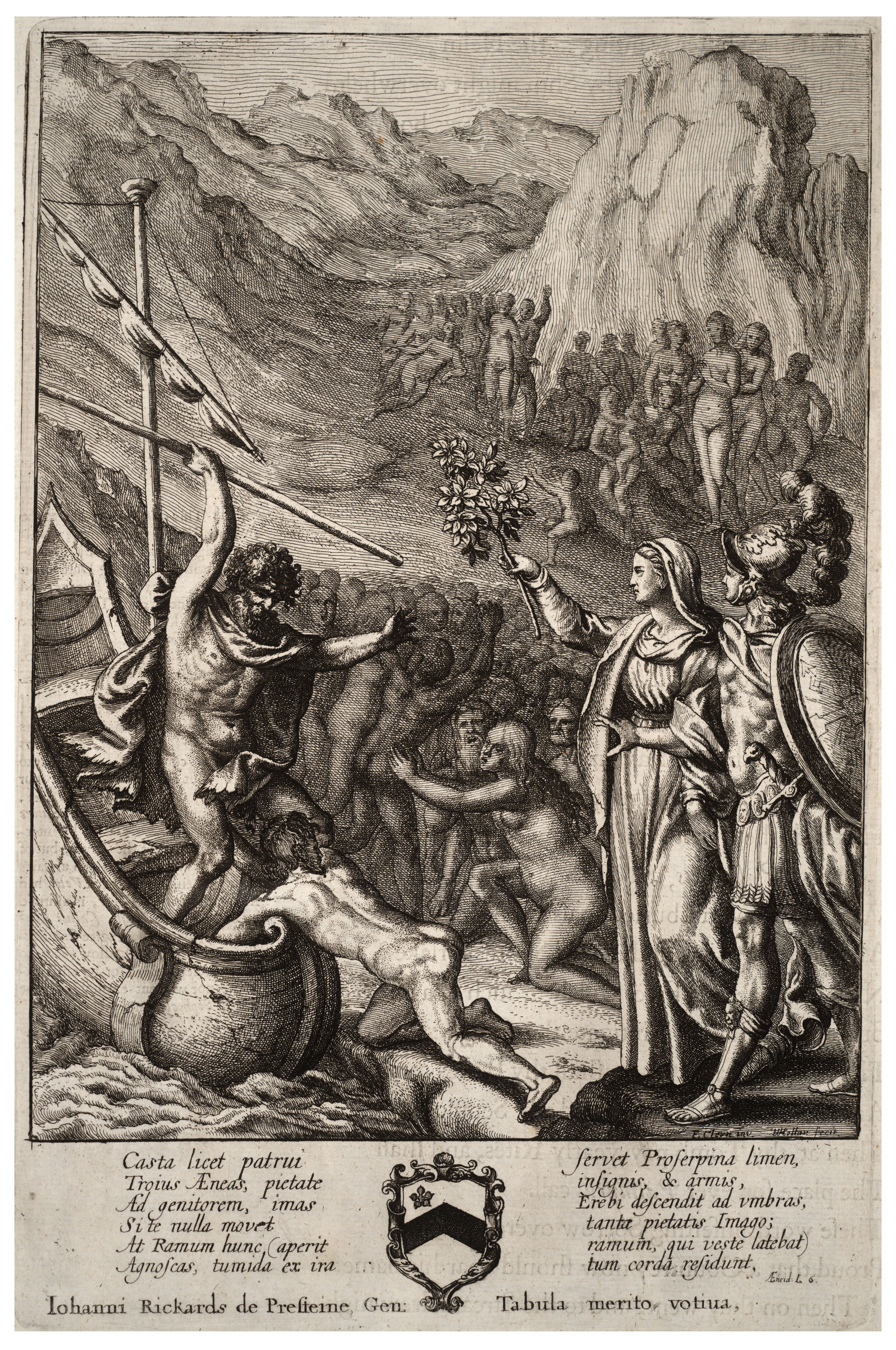
Aeneas and Charon

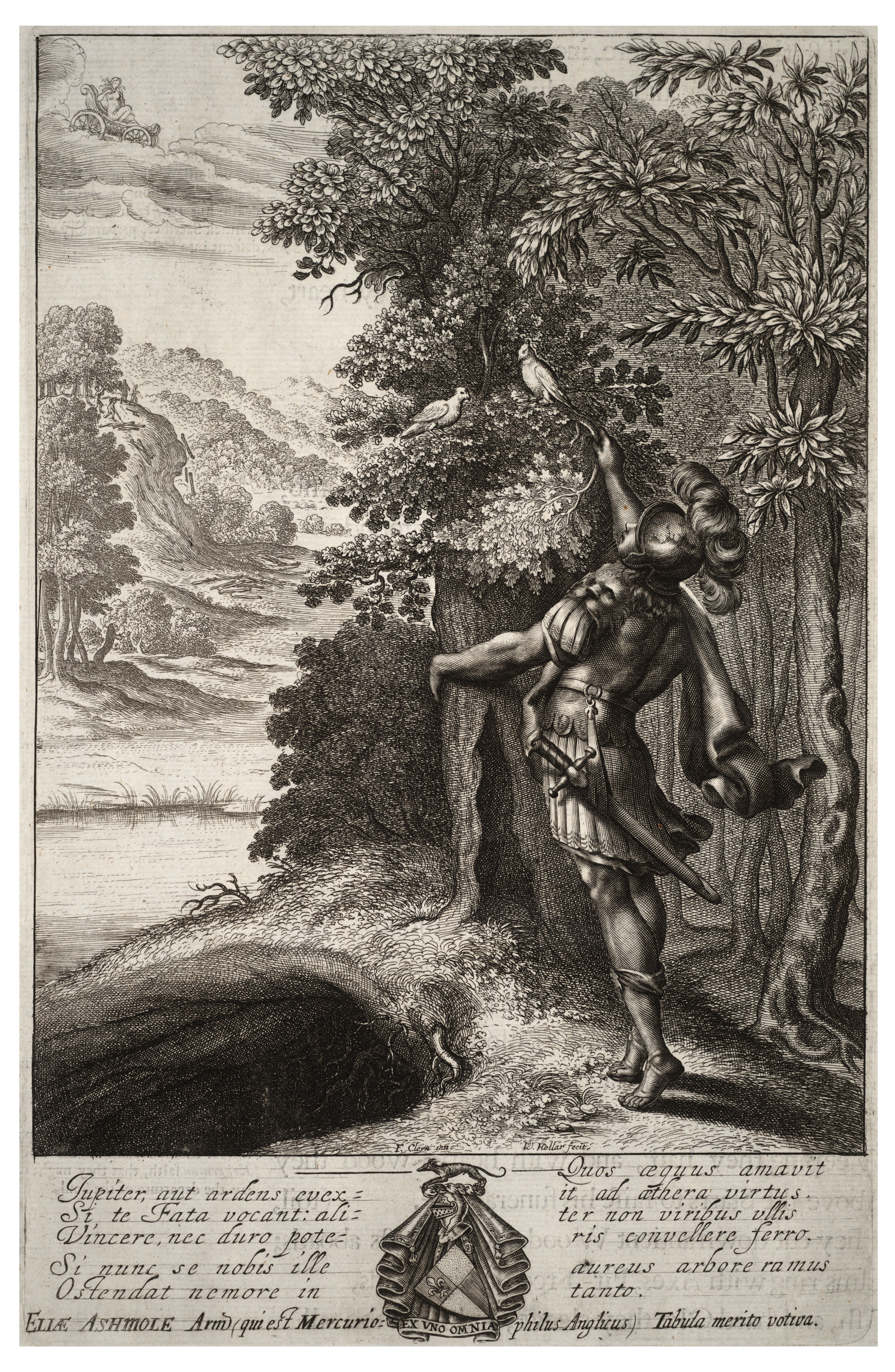
The Golden Bough

Two etchings by the Bohemian artist Wenceslaus Hollar, then resident in London, depicting the Golden Bough. Hollar copied the pieces from earlier drawings made by Francis Cleyn for John Ogilby's 1654 edition of Virgil's works.

Scholars of the works of J. R. R. Tolkien have identified parallels with the Golden Bough in several objects depicted in The Lord of the Rings, his fantasy novel published in three parts between 1954 and 1955. (Note: For the date and publication of The Lord of the Rings, see Bloom 2008, p. 188.) The literary critic Robert E. Morse sees Tolkien's character Aragorn, who is prophesied to restore and inherit the kingdom of Gondor, as an equivalent of Aeneas; he sees the herb athelas, which Aragorn uses to demonstrate his royal lineage to the steward Denethor, as corresponding to Virgil's Golden Bough. Charles A. Huttar sees the journey of the Company of the Ring into the Mines of Moria as an "Avernus of Tolkien's". (Note: Lake Avernus, the place where Virgil's Aeneas enters the Underworld, could also be used metonymically in Latin for the Underworld itself.) He argues that the mines' enchanted door, which requires the Company to utter a secret word in order to pass, offers a close parallel to the role of the Golden Bough in the Aeneid. Reading the same episode, James Obertino sees the light-bringing staff held by the wizard Gandalf and the mithril shirt worn by the protagonist Frodo as echoing the Golden Bough, since both give Frodo the psychological strength necessary for the symbolic katabasis represented by the mines.

In the third part of The Lord of the Rings, The Return of the King, Frodo's companion Sam descends into the caves of Cirith Ungol, the home of the monstrous spider Shelob: this episode has also been interpreted as a symbolic katabasis. The Phial of Galadriel, which Sam uses to ward off Shelob, has accordingly been interpreted as parallel to the Golden Bough. The Virgilian scholar Kenneth J. Reckford sees the destruction of the One Ring at the climax of The Return of the King as echoing Aeneas's plucking of the Golden Bough, on the grounds that both are "in many ways, a kind of death"; he similarly sees the White Tree at the centre of Tolkien's city of Minas Tirith as a parallel to the bough, in that both "[reflect] the old, primitive awareness that victory is bought by human sacrifice, life won through death". Considering Tolkien's earlier novel The Hobbit, published in 1937, the classicist Benjamin Eldon Stevens describes the protagonist Bilbo Baggins's journeys beneath the Misty Mountains and into the lair of the dragon Smaug as symbolic descents into the Underworld. He contrasts Bilbo's discovery of the One Ring in the former episode, which is found in darkness and allows him to become invisible, with Aeneas's discovery of the Golden Bough, which is found outside the Underworld and allows the corporeal Aeneas to go where only incorporeal shades may usually pass. He further compares the opening of Smaug's lair, which opens with a "gleam of light" and to the sound of a thrush's call, with the revelation of the Golden Bough in the Aeneid.

== See also ==
- Totenpass – "Passport of the dead" in some ancient Greco-Roman religions.
- Katabasis – Journey into the underworld in literature.
- Silver Branch – Symbol in Irish mythology and literature.

== Works cited ==
- Baker, Nicholas Scott (2011). "Medicean Metamorphoses: Carnival in Florence, 1513". Renaissance Studies. 25 (4): 491–510. ISSN 0269-1213. JSTOR 24420313.
- Barrett, Anthony A. (1977). "A Virgilian Scene from the Frampton Roman Villa, Dorset". The Antiquaries Journal. 57 (2): 312–314. doi:10.1017/S000358150003122X. ISSN 1758-5309.
- Barrett, Anthony A. (1978). "Knowledge of the Literary Classics in Roman Britain". Britannia. 9: 307–313. ISSN 0068-113X. JSTOR 525945.
- Bartsch, Shadi (1997). Ideology in Cold Blood: A Reading of Lucan's Civil War. Cambridge, Massachusetts: Harvard University Press. ISBN 0-674-44291-1.
- Baswell, Christopher (1995). Virgil in Medieval England: Figuring the Aeneid from the Twelfth Century to Chaucer. Cambridge University Press. ISBN 0-521-46294-0.
- Beard, Mary (1992). "Frazer, Leach, and Virgil: The Popularity (and Unpopularity) of the Golden Bough". Comparative Studies in Society and History. 34 (2): 203–224. ISSN 0010-4175. JSTOR 178943.
- Bischoff, Bernhard (1990). Latin Palaeography: Antiquity and the Middle Ages. Translated by Cróinin, Daibhm O.; Ganz, David. Cambridge University Press. ISBN 0-51-180992-1 – via Internet Archive.
- Bloom, Harold, ed. (2008). The Lord of the Rings. Bloom's Modern Critical Interpretations. New York: Chelsea House Publishers. ISBN 978-1-60413-145-1.
- Bouman, José; Janssen, Frans A. (1996). "Champ fleury Revisited: Some of Tory's Sources Reconsidered". Quaerendo. 26 (1): 37–51. ISSN 0014-9527 – via Academia.edu.
- Boyle, Anthony J. (1999). "Aeneid 8: Images of Rome". In Perkell, Christine (ed.). Reading Virgil's Aeneid: An Interpretative Guide. Norman: University of Oklahoma Press. pp. 148–161. ISBN 0-8061-3139-X.
- Bradford, Curtis (1960). "Yeats's Byzantium Poems: A Study of Their Development". PMLA. 75 (1): 110–125. ISSN 1938-1530. JSTOR 460433.
- Braund, Susan H. (2008). Introduction. Civil War. By Lucan. Oxford World's Classics. Oxford University Press. pp. xiii–l. ISBN 0-19-954068-3.
- Braund, Susanna (2017). Understanding Latin Literature. London and New York: Routledge. ISBN 978-1-317-24027-3.
- Bremmer, Jan (2009). "The Golden Bough: Orphic, Eleusinian and Hellenistic-Jewish Sources of Virgil's Underworld". Kernos. 22: 183–208. doi:10.4000/kernos.1785. ISSN 2034-7871.
- Bremmer, Jan (2014). Initiation into the Mysteries of the Ancient World. Berlin: De Gruyter. ISBN 978-3-11-029955-7.
- Brooks, Robert A. (1953). "Discolor aura: Reflections on the Golden Bough". The American Journal of Philology. 74 (3): 260–280. ISSN 0002-9475. JSTOR 292310.
- Clark, Raymond J. (1979). Catabasis: Vergil and the Wisdom-Tradition. Amsterdam: B. R. Grüner. ISBN 90-6032-104-9 – via Internet Archive.
- Clausen, Wendell (1995). "Appendix". A Companion to the Study of Virgil. By Horsfall, Nicholas. Mnemosyne Supplements. Vol. 151. Leiden: Brill. pp. 313–314. ISBN 90-04-09559-4. ISSN 0169-8958.
- Cormier, Raymond J. (1988). "Qui détient le Rameau d'Or devant Charon? (Enéide, VI.405–407)" [Who Holds the Golden Bough Before Charon? (Aeneid, VI.405–407)]. Rheinisches Museum für Philologie. Neue Folge (in French). 131 (2): 151–156. ISSN 0035-449X. JSTOR 41233674.
- Cox-Rearick, Janet (1984). Dynasty and Destiny in Medici Art: Pontormo, Leo X, and the Two Cosimos. Princeton University Press. ISBN 0-691-04023-0.
- Cropper, Elizabeth (1988). Pietro Testa, 1612–1650: Prints and Drawings. Philadelphia Museum of Art. ISBN 0-87633-077-4.
- Currie, Bruno (2024). "Heracles and Gilgamesh in Early Greek Epic". In Tsagalis, Christos C. (ed.). Heracles in Early Greek Epic. Mnemosyne Supplements. Vol. 482. Leiden: Brill. pp. 13–62. doi:10.1163/9789004696617. ISBN 978-90-04-69619-8. ISSN 0169-8958.
- D'Arista, Carla (2021). "The Pucci of Florence: Trusted Counsellors in Florence, Watchful Eyes in Rome". In Botke, Klazina Dieuwke; Van Ween, Henk (eds.). A Cultural Symbiosis: Patrician Art Patronage and Medicean Cultural Politics in Florence (1530–1610). Leuven University Press. pp. 73–110. ISBN 978-94-6270-296-7.
- Day, David (2019). An Encyclopedia of Tolkien: The History and Mythology that Inspired Tolkien's World. San Diego: Canterbury Classics. ISBN 978-1-64517-009-9.
- Ellmann, Richard (1979). Yeats: The Man and the Masks. Oxford University Press. ISBN 0-19-281259-9 – via Internet Archive.
- Falconer, Rachel (2021). Seamus Heaney, Virgil and the Good of Poetry. Edinburgh University Press. ISBN 978-1-4744-5441-4.
- Fantham, Elaine (2004). Ovid's Metamorphoses. Oxford Approaches to Classical Literature. Oxford University Press. ISBN 0-19-515409-6.
- Farina, William (2009). Perpetua of Carthage: Portrait of a Third-Century Martyr. Jefferson: MacFarland. ISBN 978-0-7864-8263-4.
- Farrell, Joseph (2023). Juno's Aeneid: A Battle for Heroic Identity. Princeton University Press. ISBN 978-0-691-22125-0.
- Faulkner, Andrew (2011). "Introduction: Modern Scholarship on the Homeric Hymns: Foundational Issues". In Faulkner, Andrew (ed.). The Homeric Hymns: Interpretative Essays. Oxford University Press. pp. 1–28. doi:10.1093/acprof:oso/9780199589036.003.0001. ISBN 978-0-19-958903-6.
- Finkelpearl, Ellen (1990). "Psyche, Aeneas and an Ass: Apuleius Metamorphoses 6.10–6.21". Transactions of the American Philological Society. 120: 333–347. ISSN 0360-5949. JSTOR 283995.
- Fowler, Don P. (1989). "Brief Reviews: Roman Literature". Greece & Rome. 36 (1): 100–109. ISSN 0017-3835. JSTOR 643190.
- Fratantuono, Lee (2007). Madness Unchained: A Reading of Virgil's Aeneid. Lanham: Lexington Books. ISBN 978-0-7391-1237-3.
- Gildenhard, Ingo; Gotter, Ulrich; Havener, Wolfgang; Hodgson, Louise (2019). "Introduction: Attending to the Past: On the Politics of Time in Ancient Rome". In Gildenhard, Ingo; Gotter, Ulrich; Havener, Wolfgang; Hodgson, Louise (eds.). Augustus and the Destruction of History: The Politics of the Past in Early Imperial Rome. Cambridge Philological Society. pp. 1–36. ISBN 978-0-9568381-8-6.
- Gilmore, Thomas B., Jr (1976). "The Comedy of Swift's Scatological Poems". PMLA. 91 (1): 33–43. ISSN 1938-1530. JSTOR 461393.
- Glenn, Edgar M. (1998). "Serendipitous Aphrodite in Ezra Pound's Canto I". Paideumena: Modern and Contemporary Poetry and Politics. 27 (2/3): 9–51. ISSN 0090-5674. JSTOR 24726186.
- Godfrey, Richard T. (1994). Wenceslaus Hollar: A Bohemian Artist in England. New Haven and London: Yale University Press. ISBN 0-300-06166-8 – via Internet Archive.
- Green, Carin M. C. (2007). Roman Religion and the Cult of Diana at Aricia. Cambridge University Press. ISBN 978-0-521-85158-9.
- Griffin, Jasper (1984). "Augustus and the Poets: Caesar qui cogere posset". In Millar, Fergus; Segal, Erich (eds.). Caesar Augustus: Seven Aspects. Oxford University Press. pp. 189–218. ISBN 0-19-814851-8.
- Groos, Arthur (1995). Romancing the Grail: Genre, Science and Quest in Wolfram's Parzival. New York: Cornell University Press. ISBN 0-8014-3068-2.
- Hacker, Peter M. S. (1992). "Developmental Hypotheses and Perspicuous Representations: Wittgenstein on Frazer's 'Golden Bough'". Iyyun: The Jerusalem Philosophical Quarterly. 41: 277–299. ISSN 0021-3306. JSTOR 23350691.
- Hanning, Barbara Russano (2025). Studies in Music, Words, and Imagery in Early Modern Europe. Variorum Collected Studies. London and New York: Routledge. ISBN 978-1-032-68768-1.
- Hardie, Philip (2016). "Introduction: Augustan Poetry and the Irrational". In Hardie, Philip (ed.). Augustan Poetry and the Irrational. Oxford University Press. pp. 1–36. ISBN 978-0-19-872472-8.
- Hardie, Philip (2024). A Commentary on Ovid's Metamorphoses. Vol. 3: Books 13–15 and Indices. Cambridge University Press. doi:10.1017/9781139017213. ISBN 978-1-139-01721-3.
- Harrison, Stephen (1990) [1967]. "Some Views of the Aeneid in the Twentieth Century". In Harrison, Stephen (ed.). Oxford Readings in Vergil's Aeneid. Oxford University Press. pp. 1–20. ISBN 0-19-814388-5.
- Harrison, Stephen (1999). "Aeneid". In Hornblower, Simon; Spawforth, Anthony (eds.). The Oxford Classical Dictionary (3rd ed.). Oxford University Press. pp. 22–23. ISBN 0-19-866172-X.
- Harrison, Stephen (2017). "A Voyage Around the "Harvard School"". The Classical World. 111 (1): 76–79. doi:10.1353/clw.2017.0071. ISSN 0009-8418. JSTOR 48553373.
- Haynes, Justin (2021). The Medieval Classic: Twelfth-century Latin Epic and the Virgilian Commentary Tradition. Oxford University Press. ISBN 978-0-19-009136-1.
- Horsfall, Nicholas (2013). Virgil: Aeneid 6: A Commentary. Vol. 2: Commentary and Appendices. Berlin: De Gruyter. doi:10.1515/9783110229912. ISBN 978-3-11-022990-5.
- Huttar, Charles A. (2003) [1974]. "Hell and the City: Tolkien and the Traditions of Western Literature". In Lobdell, Jared (ed.). A Tolkien Compass. Chicago and La Salle: Open Court. pp. 115–140. ISBN 0-87548-303-8.
- Jaeger, C. Stephen (2010). The Origins of Courtliness: Civilizing Trends and the Formation of Courtly Ideals, 939–1210. Philadelphia: University of Pennsylvania Press. ISBN 978-0-8122-0089-8.
- Joly, Jacques (1978). Les Fêtes théâtrales de Métastase à la cour de Vienne: 1731–1767 [Metastasio's Theatrical Celebrations at the Court of Vienna: 1731–1767]. Publications de la Faculté des Lettres de Clermont II (in French). Clermont-Ferrand: Presses Univ. Blaise Pascal. ISBN 2-84516-019-4.
- Käppel, Lutz (2008). "Prosymnus". In Cancik, Hubert; Schneider, Helmuth (eds.). Brill's New Pauly: Antiquity. Vol. 12L Prol–Sar (English ed.). Leiden: Brill. col. 61. ISBN 978-90-04-14217-6 – via Internet Archive.
- Kleiner, John (2000). "On Failing One's Teachers: Dante, Virgil, and the Ironies of Instruction". In Cornish, Alison; Stewart, Dane E. (eds.). Sparks and Seeds: Medieval Literature and Its Aftermath: Essays in Honor of John Freccero. Turnhout: Brepols Publishers. pp. 61–74. ISBN 2-503-50906-1.
- Koorthojian, Michael (2015). "Roman Sarcophagi". In Borg, Barbara E. (ed.). A Companion to Roman Art. Chichester: Wiley–Blackwell. pp. 286–300. ISBN 978-1-4051-9288-0.
- Kress, Berthold (2014). Divine Diagrams: The Manuscripts and Drawings of Paul Lautensack (1477/78–1558). Leiden: Brill. ISBN 978-90-04-26237-9.
- Ladner, Gerhart Burian (1983). Images and Ideas in the Middle Ages: Selected Studies in History and Art. Vol. 2. Rome: Edizioni di storia e letteratura. ISBN 88-8498-898-5.
- Marks, Raymond (2024). Off the Beaten Path: Ovidian Journeys in Valerius Flaccus's Argonautica. Berlin: De Gruyter. doi:10.1515/9783111403649. ISBN 978-3-11-140364-9.
- Masters, Jamie (1992). Poetry and Civil War in Lucan's Bellum Civile. Cambridge Classical Studies. Cambridge University Press. ISBN 0-521-41460-1.
- Michels, Agnes Kirsopp (1945). "The Golden Bough of Plato". The American Journal of Philology. 66 (1): 59–63. ISSN 0002-9475. JSTOR 291410.
- Mitchell, Stephen (1976). "Requisitioned Transport in the Roman Empire: A New Inscription from Pisidia". The Journal of Roman Studies. 66: 106–131. ISSN 0075-4358. JSTOR 299783.
- Morse, Robert E. (1986). Evocation of Virgil in Tolkien's Art: Geritol for the Classics. Louisville: Bolchazy-Carducci Publishers. ISBN 0-86516-175-5.
- Musgrove, Margaret Worsham (2000). The Student's Ovid: Selections from the Metamorphoses. Oklahoma Series in Classical Culture. Norman: University of Oklahoma Press. ISBN 0-8061-3220-5 – via Internet Archive.
- Nagy, Gregory (2018). Greek Mythology and Poetics. New York: Cornell University Press. ISBN 978-1-5017-3202-7.
- Nelis, Damien (2001). Vergil's Aeneid and the Argonautica of Apollonius Rhodius. ARCA: Classical and Medieval Texts, Papers and Monographs. Vol. 39. Cambridge: Francis Cairns. ISBN 0-905205-97-9.
- Nodes, Daniel J. (2005). "The Poems "ex Graeco" by Petrus Crinitus (1474–1507) and the Validation of His Major Themes". International Journal of the Classical Tradition. 11 (4): 524–537. ISSN 1073-0508. JSTOR 30222011.
- Obertino, James (1993). "Moria and Hades: Underworld Journeys in Tolkien and Virgil". Comparative Literature Studies. 30 (2): 153–169. ISSN 1528-4212. JSTOR 40246877.
- Ogden, Daniel (2004). Greek and Roman Necromancy. Princeton University Press. ISBN 0-691-11968-6.
- O'Hara, James J. (2013). "Harvard School". In Thomas, Richard F.; Ziolkowski, Jan M. (eds.). The Virgil Encyclopaedia (Online ed.). Wiley. pp. 588–589. doi:10.1002/9781118351352.wbve0968. ISBN 978-1-118-35135-2.
- Ossa-Richardson, Anthony (2008). "From Servius to Frazer: The Golden Bough and its Transformations". International Journal of the Classical Tradition. 15 (3): 339–368. ISSN 1073-0508. JSTOR 25691242.
- Parry, Adam (1963). "The Two Voices of Virgil's Aeneid". Arion: A Journal of the Humanities and the Classics. 2 (4): 66–80. ISSN 0095-5809. JSTOR 20162871.
- Pârvulescu, Adrian (2005). "The Golden Bough, Aeneas' Piety, and the Suppliant Branch". Latomus. 64 (4): 882–909. ISSN 2294-4427. JSTOR 41543919.
- Penn, Tim (2023). "Experiencing Gloomy Dis: Tombs, Tunnels and the Phenomenology of the Roman Underworld in the Phlegraean Fields" (PDF). Oxford Journal of Archaeology. 42 (3): 221–243. ISSN 1468-0092.
- Penwill, John (2018). "How It All Began: Civil War and Valerius's Argonautica". In Krasne, Darcy Anne; Ginsberg, Lauren Donovan (eds.). After 69 CE: Writing Civil War in Flavian Rome. Berlin: De Gruyter. pp. 69–88. ISBN 978-3-11-058584-1.
- Perring, Dominic (2003). "Deconstructing the Frampton Pavements: Gnostic Dialectic in Roman Britain?" (PDF). In Carr, Gillian; Swift, Ellen; Weekes, Jake (eds.). TRAC 2002: Proceedings of the Twelfth Annual Theoretical Roman Archaeology Conference. Oxford: Oxbow Books. pp. 74–83. ISBN 1-84217-100-3.
- Pickup, Sadie; Smith, Amy C. (2010). "Budding Aphrodite: Into the Future". Brill's Companion to Aphrodite. Leiden: Brill. pp. 17–26. doi:10.1163/9789047444503_003. ISBN 978-90-04-18003-1.
- Pillinger, Emily (2019). Cassandra and the Poetics of Prophecy in Greek and Latin Literature. Cambridge University Press. doi:10.1017/9781108564007. ISBN 978-1-108-56400-7.
- Poletti, Beatrice (2023). Dionysius and the City of Rome: Portraits of Founders in the Roman Antiquities. London: Bloomsbury. ISBN 979-8-8818-8189-4.
- Poo Mu-chou (2009). Rethinking Ghosts in World Religions. Leiden: Brill. ISBN 90-474-2484-0.
- Quin, Jack (2022). W. B. Yeats and the Language of Sculpture. Oxford University Press. ISBN 978-0-19-284315-9.
- Reckford, Kenneth J. (1974). "Some Trees in Virgil and Tolkien". In Galinsky, Karl (ed.). Perspectives of Roman Poetry. Austin: University of Texas Press. pp. 57–92. ISBN 978-0-292-77283-0.
- Reed, Joseph D. (2024). "Commentary on Book 11". A Commentary on Ovid's Metamorphoses. By Reed, Joseph D.; Kenney, E. J. Vol. 2: Books 7–12. Cambridge University Press. pp. 437–542. doi:10.1017/9781139021586. ISBN 978-1-139-02158-6.
- Reynolds, Graham; Brown, David Blayney (2022). Turner. World of Art. London: Thames and Hudson. ISBN 978-0-500-77589-9.
- Rollo, David (2022). Medieval Writings on Sex Between Men: Peter Damian's The Book of Gomorrah and Alain de Lille's The Plaint of Nature. Leiden: Brill. ISBN 978-90-04-50732-6.
- Romano, Carman (2025). "Rape and Revenge in the Homeric Hymn to Aphrodite". Arethusa. 58 (1): 75–100. doi:10.1353/are.2025.a953232. ISSN 1080-6504.
- Roppen, Georg; Sommer, Richard (1964). Strangers and Pilgrims: An Essay on the Metaphor of Journey. Bergen: Norwegian Universities Press. OCLC 1005710.
- Ruskin, John (1857). Notes on the Turner Gallery at Marlborough House. London: Smith, Elder & Co. OCLC 1049965086 – via Internet Archive.
- Segal, Charles (1965). "Aeternum per Saecula Nomen: The Golden Bough and the Tragedy of History, Part 1". Arion: A Journal of Humanities and the Classics. 4 (4): 617–657. ISSN 0095-5809. JSTOR 20162991.
- Segal, Charles (1966). "Aeternum per Saecula Nomen: The Golden Bough and the Tragedy of History, Part 2". Arion: A Journal of Humanities and the Classics. 5 (1): 34–72. ISSN 0095-5809. JSTOR 20163006.
- Segal, Charles (1968). "The Hesitation of the Golden Bough: A Reexamination". Hermes. 96 (1): 74–79. ISSN 0018-0777. JSTOR 4475491.
- Seyrig, Henri (1944). "Le Rameau Mystique" [The Mystic Bough]. American Journal of Archaeology (in French). 48 (1): 20–25. ISSN 0002-9114. JSTOR 499215.
- Shanes, Eric (1990). Turner's Human Landscapes. London: William Heinemann. ISBN 0-434-69502-5.
- Sherbo, Arthur (1988). "Swift's Abuse of Poetic Diction". College Literature. 15 (3): 233–248. ISSN 0093-3139. JSTOR 25111789.
- Simon, Erika; Bauchhenss, Gerhard (1992). "Mercurius". Lexicon Iconographicum Mythologiae Classicae (in German). Vol. 6.1: Kentauroi et Kentaurides – Oiax. Zurich and Munich: Artemis Verlag. pp. 500–554. ISBN 3-7608-8751-1 – via Internet Archive.
- Singleton, Charles S. (1970). The Divine Comedy: Inferno. Vol. 2: Commentary. Princeton University Press. ISBN 0-691-01895-2.
- Slatin, Myles (1963). "A History of Pound's Cantos I–XVI, 1915–1925". American Literature. 35 (2): 183–195. JSTOR 2923422.
- Smith, Jonathan Z. (1973). "When the Bough Breaks". History of Religions. 12 (4): 342–371. JSTOR 1062126.
- Soranzo, Matteo (2020). "Exploring the Forests of Antiquity: the Golden Bough and Early Modern Spirituality". In Gladhill, Bill; Myers, Micah Young (eds.). Walking through Elysium: Vergil's Underworld and the Poetics of Tradition. University of Toronto Press. pp. 77–93. ISBN 978-1-487-50577-6.
- Sterpetti, Lunarita (2023). "Ottaviano de' Medici e la sua collezione: arte e politica tra repubblica e ducato" [Ottaviano de' Medici and His Collection: Art and Politics Between Republic and Duchy]. Mitteilungen des Kunsthistorischen Institutes in Florenz (in Italian). 65 (2/3): 235–270. doi:10.11588/mkhi.2023.2/3.113958. ISSN 0342-1201.
- Stevens, Benjamin Eldon (2017). "Ancient Underworlds in J. R. R. Tolkien's The Hobbit". In Rogers, Brett M.; Stevens, Benjamin Eldon (eds.). Classical Traditions in Modern Fantasy. Oxford University Press. pp. 121–144. doi:10.1093/acprof:oso/9780190610050.001.0001. ISBN 978-0-19-061006-7.
- Stover, Tim (2012). Epic and Empire in Vespasianic Rome: A New Reading of Valerius Flaccus' Argonautica. Oxford University Press. doi:10.1093/acprof:oso/9780199644087.001.0001. ISBN 978-0-19-964408-7.
- Tarrant, Richard J. (1997). "Poetry and Power: Virgil's Poetry in Contemporary Context". In Martindale, Charles (ed.). The Cambridge Companion to Virgil. Cambridge University Press. pp. 169–187. ISBN 0-521-49885-6.
- Taylor, Richard P. (2000). Death and the Afterlife: A Cultural Encyclopedia. London: Bloomsbury Academic. ISBN 0-87436-939-8.
- Terrell, Carol F. (1980). A Companion to The Cantos of Ezra Pound. Oakland: University of California Press. ISBN 0-520-08287-7.
- Thomas, Richard F. (2001). Virgil and the Augustan Reception. Cambridge University Press. doi:10.1017/CBO9780511482403. ISBN 0-511-48240-X.
- Thornton, Agathe (1976). The Living Universe: Gods and Men in Virgil's Aeneid. Mnemosyne Supplements. Vol. 46. Leiden: Brill. ISBN 90-04-04579-1.
- Torrance, Isabelle; O'Rourke, Donncha (2020). "Classics and Irish Politics: Introduction". In Torrance, Isabelle; O'Rourke, Donncha (eds.). Classics and Irish Politics, 1916–2016. Oxford University Press. pp. 1–23. doi:10.1093/oso/9780198864486.001.0001. ISBN 978-0-19-189658-3.
- Trimble, Gail (2026). "Vergilian Roleplay in The Rape of the Lock". In May, Regine; Conybeare, Catherine (eds.). Latin Lineages: A Family Tree from Catullus to Today. Trends in Classics – Pathways of Reception. Berlin: De Gruyter. pp. 283–306. ISBN 978-3-111-70717-4.
- Walsh, John (2007). "Descent". In Drout, Michael D. C. (ed.). J. R. R. Tolkien Encyclopedia: Scholarship and Critical Assessment. London and New York: Routledge. pp. 122–124. ISBN 978-0-415-96942-0.
- Weber, Clifford (1995). "The Allegory of the Golden Bough". Vergilius. 41: 3–34. ISSN 0506-7294. JSTOR 41587127.
- Weinberg, Florence M. (1990). "Written on the Leaves: Rabelais and the Sibylline Tradition". Renaissance Quarterly. 43 (4): 709–730. ISSN 0034-4338. JSTOR 2862786.
- West, David (1987). The Bough and the Gate. Jackson Knight Memorial Lectures. Vol. 17. University of Exeter. ISBN 0-85989-278-6.
- Whitehorne, John E. G. (1975). "Golden Statues in Greek and Latin Literature". Greece & Rome. 22 (2): 109–119. doi:10.1017/S0017383500020829. ISSN 0017-3835. JSTOR 642711.
- Ye Shuxian (2026). The Golden Bough vs the Jade Leaf: A Chinese Perspective of Comparative Mythology. Translated by Jia Hui; Wu Biyu. Shanghai: Fudan University Press. ISBN 978-981-95-2351-1.
- Ziolkowski, Jan (2004). "Latin and Vernacular Literature". In Luscombe, David; Riley-Smith, Jonathan (eds.). The New Cambridge Medieval History. Vol. 4: c. 1024 – c. 1198, Part 1. Cambridge University Press. pp. 658–692. doi:10.1017/CHOL9780521414104.019. ISBN 978-1-139-05402-7.
