= The Golden Bough (disambiguation) =

The Golden Bough is a comparative study of mythology and religion written by the Scottish anthropologist Sir James George Frazer.

The Golden Bough may also refer to:

- Golden Bough (Aeneid), mythical object from the epic Aeneid, book VI, by the Roman poet Virgil
- The Golden Bough (painting), a painting from 1834 by the English painter J. M. W. Turner
