= David West (classical scholar) =

British classicist (1926–2013)

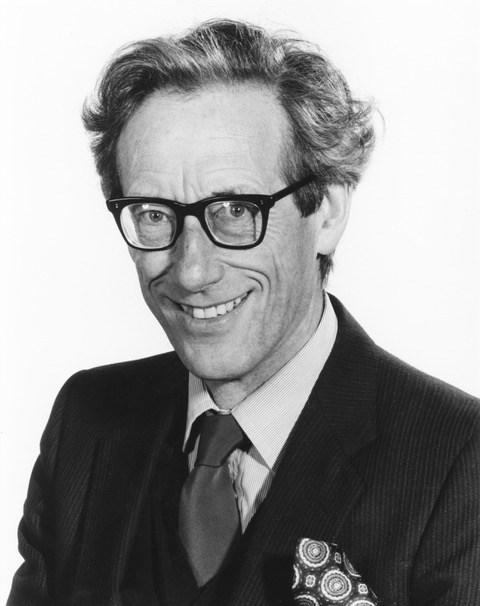
- Official portrait
- Born: David Alexander West; 22 November 1926; Aberdeen, Scotland
- Died: 13 May 2013 (aged 86)
- Spouse: Pamela Murray (m. 1953; died 1995)
- Children: 5

Academic background
- Education: University of Cambridge

Academic work
- Discipline: Classics
- Sub-discipline: Roman poetry
- Institutions: University of Newcastle

David Alexander West (22 November 1926 – 13 May 2013) was a British classical scholar who served as Professor and then emeritus Professor of Latin at Newcastle University from 1969 until his death. Described as "one of the world's leading scholars and teachers of Latin and the Classics", West's outreach and curriculum reforms as Chair corresponded to Newcastle's becoming a "powerhouse of classical learning". He encouraged close reading in class and produced accessible translations of the Aeneid and Horace's Odes. He was also interested in English literature and published a commentary on Shakespeare's sonnets.

== Life and career ==
West was born in Aberdeen, Scotland on 22 November 1926 to a carpenter father. His father had wanted West to join him in the shipbuilding trade, but whereas West could not cut timber straight, he successively won bursaries to Aberdeen Grammar School and Cambridge University. After completing National Service in the Royal Air Force toward the end of the Second World War, he matriculated at Sidney Sussex College.

West achieved a first in the Classical Tripos and in 1951 began research on the manuscript history of The Frogs of Aristophanes, which took him to Italy. Though this ultimately came to nothing, West met at the British School at Rome the wealthy Home Counties woman Pamela Murray, whom he married in 1953; together they had three sons and two daughters and remained together till her death in 1995.

In 1952, West took up a lectureship at Sheffield University, and in 1956 one at Edinburgh University. In this time, his focus shifted to Latin literature, especially poetry, and he published the seminal Reading Horace in 1967.

In 1969, the long-serving and "preternaturally shy" G. B. A. Fletcher retired as the Chair of Latin at Newcastle University. Against expectations, and West's sole book published to date, he was named as Fletcher's replacement. That year, West put out two more noteworthy works, namely, The Image and Poetry of Lucretius (1969) and, for the Journal of Roman Studies, "Multiple-Correspondence Similes in The Aeneid" (1969). Additionally, having tried to bring about a "renaissance" in classics at Edinburgh, following the post-war decline in interest, West aimed to increase interest among current and prospective students. He modernised the syllabus, moving from set texts to authors representative of their genres, even though the reform initially meant removing Horace's Odes. He also spoke at open days and devised a "Latin Alive" Easter reading course, when he taught and played football with sixth-formers whose schools had not axed the language from their curriculum. Conversational and receptive to colleagues and students alike, West served as University Pro-Vice-Chancellor from 1976 to 1980. His efforts bore fruit: according to colleague A. J. Woodman, it was West who made Newcastle a "vibrant, confident and convivial community of scholars".

In the 1970s and '80s, he co-edited with Tony Woodman the essay collections Quality and Pleasure in Latin Literature (1974), Creative Imitation and Latin Literature (1979) and Poetry and Propaganda in the Age of Augustus (1984). Over the course of his career, however, West became gradually detached from and disgusted with modern literary theory, which he said produced "pretentious writing and penitential reading ... numbingly obvious platitudes obscured by jargons to look drastically profound". Instead, West promoted close reading of a poet's original words to get at his true meaning. West practised this during seminars, which were not done during Fletcher's day, and also from 1990 to 1991 in his weekly column in The Times entitled "How It Worked", where he forensically dissected an English-language poem. His 1990 prose translation of the Aeneid for Penguin likewise emphasised clarity over per se "stylishness".

This zeal was witnessed by his peers: as host of the Seminar Boreas—a convention he founded for Northern English classicists—West once heckled a speaker on Virgil: "Must we listen to any more of this?" He also enjoyed poking fun at Newcastle's English department by hosting lunchtime seminars with faculty and picking their theories apart. Still, his reputation was fine, and when in 1992 he retired the Chairmanship and was succeeded by Jonathan Powell, West was commemorated by a Festschrift entitled Author and Audience in Latin Literature (1992). He delivered an exaugural speech to the University on the English poet George Herbert's Greek-inspired "Easter Wings". In 1994, he was elected that year's president of the Classical Association and in his address urged students to "cast out theory, and get down to real work on the texts". West himself remained active till his death, publishing a three-volume commentary on the Odes (1995–2002), complete translations of the Odes and Epodes of Horace (1997) and a five-hundred-page work on Shakespeare's sonnets (2007). At the time of his death, West was serving as Vice President of the Association for Latin Teaching and was nearly finished with a translation of Gavin Douglas's Eneados (1513), a Middle Scots translation of the Aeneid.

West lived in a large house at Hexham, though frequently slept nights on a camp-bed in his office. Athletic, hospitable and with Epicurean loves for gardening and wine, when West was caught up in a flood, rescue workers found him sitting in an upper window, toasting them with a glass of Chianti Classico. He died of a stroke aged 86 on 13 May 2013 and was commemorated by a symposium at Newcastle and a memorial essay collection, Word and Context in Latin Poetry (2017), whose contributors focussed "attention on individual Latin texts by a close examination of the words used and, where appropriate, by a detailed investigation of the literary, social and historical contexts in which the texts were produced."

== Works ==
Authored books:

- Reading Horace (Edinburgh University Press, 1967)
- The Imagery and Poetry of Lucretius (Edinburgh University Press, 1969)
- Virgil: the Aeneid (Penguin, 1990)
- Commentaries on the Odes:
  - Horace: Odes I. Carpe diem (Oxford University Press, 1995)
  - Horace: Odes II. Vatis amici (Oxford University Press, 1998)
  - Horace: Odes III. Dulce periculum (Oxford University Press, 2002)
- Horace: The Complete Odes and Epodes (Oxford World's Classics, 1997)
- Shakespeare's Sonnets: A Commentary (Duckworth Books, 2007)

Books co-edited with Tony Woodman:

- Quality and Pleasure in Latin Poetry (Cambridge University Press, 1974)
- Creative Imitation and Latin Literature (Cambridge University Press, 1979)
- Poetry and Politics in the Age of Augustus (Cambridge University Press, 1984)

A list of West's papers was published as part of the memorial essay collection Word and Context in Latin Poetry (Cambridge Philological Society, 2017).
