= Charles Segal (classicist) =

American classical scholar

- Born: March 19, 1936; Boston, Massachusetts
- Died: January 1, 2002 (aged 65); Boston, Massachusetts

Academic background
- Education: Harvard University
- Influences: Jean-Pierre Vernant; Pierre Vidal-Naquet

Academic work
- Discipline: Classics
- Notable works: Tragedy and Civilization: an Interpretation of Sophocles (1981); Dionysiac Poetics and Euripides' Bacchae' (1982)

Charles Paul Segal (March 19, 1936 — January 1, 2002) was an American classicist renowned for his application of critical theory to ancient texts. Although his work spanned a variety of Latin and Greek genres, he is best known for his work on Greek tragedy. His most influential work is Tragedy and Civilization: an Interpretation of Sophocles (1981), in which he presents a structuralist approach to Greek theatre.

== Career ==
Segal graduated from Harvard University in 1957 and, four years later, was awarded a doctorate from the same institution for a 900-page thesis on the philosopher Democritus. He held academic positions at Brown University, Princeton University and the University of Pennsylvania, before returning to his alma mater in 1990. There, he served as the Walter C. Klein Professor of Classics until his death in 2002.

== Selected publications ==
- Tragedy and Civilization: An Interpretation of Sophocles, University of Oklahoma Press, 1981
- Dionysiac Poetics and Euripides' Bacchae, Princeton University Press, 1982
- Pindar's Mythmaking: The Fourth Pythian Ode, Princeton University Press, 1986
- Language and Desire in Seneca's Phaedra, Princeton University Press, 1986
- Interpreting Greek Tragedy: Myth, Poetry, Text, Cornell University Press, 1986
- Orpheus: the Myth of the Poet, Johns Hopkins University Press, 1989
- Lucretius on Death and Anxiety, Princeton University Press, 1990
- Euripides and the Poetics of Sorrow: Art, Gender, and Commemoration in Alcestis, Hippolytus, and Hecuba, Duke University Press, 1993
- Oedipus Tyrannus: Tragic Heroism and the Limits of Knowledge, Twayne Publishers, 1993
- Singers, Heroes, and Gods in the Odyssey, Cornell University Press, 1994
- Sophocles’ Tragic World: Divinity, Nature, Society, Harvard University Press, 1995
