= Eric Shanes =

English painter and art historian (1944–2017)

Eric Victor Shanes (21 October 1944 – 19 March 2017) was an English painter and art historian who specialised in the art of J. M. W. Turner.

== Selected publications ==
- Young Mr. Turner The First Forty Years, 1775–1815. Yale, New Haven, 2016. ISBN 9780300140651
- Shanes, Eric (2012). The Life and Masterworks of Salvador Dalí. New York: Parkstone International. ISBN 978-1-78042-879-6.

== See also ==
- John Gage
