= Anthony A. Barrett =

British-Canadian Classical scholar and author (born 1941)

Anthony Arthur Barrett
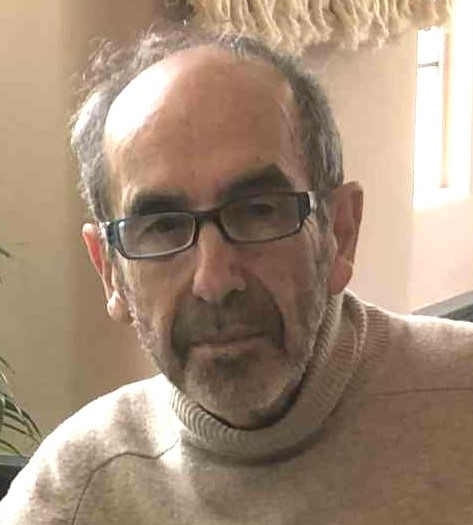
- Barrett in 2022
- Born: July 30, 1941 (age 84); Worthing, England
- Citizenship: British, Canadian
- Education: Hookergate Grammar School; Durham University (King’s College); Oxford University (St. John’s College); Cambridge University (Sidney Sussex College); Toronto University
- Occupation: Classical Scholar

Anthony Arthur Barrett (born July 30, 1941) is a British-Canadian Classical scholar and the author of several books on Roman antiquity.

== Life ==
Barrett attended Hookergate Grammar School, near Rowlands Gill, then the University of Durham (King’s College), where he graduated in Latin in 1963. He subsequently studied Classics as a Commonwealth Scholar at the University of Toronto, and Classical Archaeology at Oxford University (St. John’s College). After retirement, he studied Anglo-Saxon, Norse and Celtic at Cambridge University (Sidney Sussex College).

In 1968, he was appointed assistant professor at the University of British Columbia, Vancouver, in the Department of Classics, now the Department of Ancient Mediterranean and Near Eastern Studies. He was subsequently promoted to associate professor, and became full professor in 1984. He served as department head from 1993 – 1998. He was elected a Fellow of the Royal Society of Canada in 2000. In 2002, he was awarded a two-year Killam Research Fellowship for work on the history of the Roman Empire. In 2004, he received the title of Distinguished University Scholar of the University of British Columbia. He retired in 2007 and currently resides in Heidelberg, Germany, where he has continued his research at Heidelberg University.

His academic research has focussed on Roman history and archeology, with an emphasis on the early Roman Empire. He has written articles on Roman history and monographs on the emperors and the imperial family. He produced a study of Caligula, which was praised as a "remarkable book" by Israeli historian Zvi Yavetz. He published the first detailed scholarly account of the Neronian Great Fire of Rome, which analyzes the historical significance and consequences of the fire as well as the evidence for it in the archaeological record. He argues that although the archaeological evidence suggests that the fire was less extensive than is popularly believed, the economic and political repercussions were enormous and contributed substantially to the demise of Rome’s first ruling dynasty, the Julio-Claudians. His books have been translated into French, German, Italian, Spanish, Russian, Czech, Estonian and Chinese. He has also produced translations and commentaries on Classical and Renaissance authors.

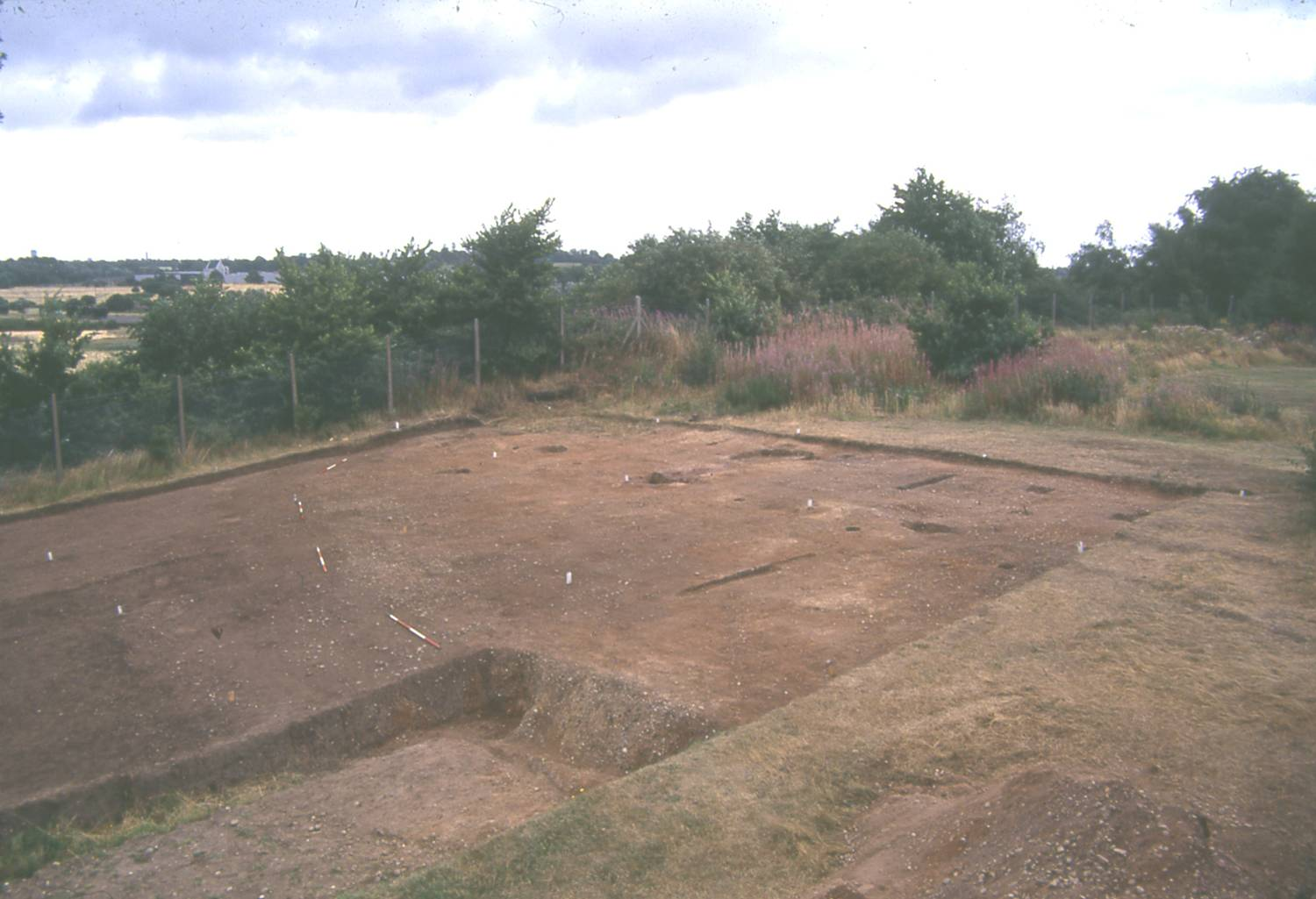
Lunt Roman Fort Western Defences under Excavation

A participant in archaeological excavations in Britain, he has written a number of articles on Roman Britain, and from 1988–2003 he directed the Archaeological Training Excavation at the Lunt Roman Fort near Coventry, England, which exposed the northern section of the western defences of the fort.

While in Vancouver, he was a member of the Royal Astronomical Society of Canada and has written on ancient astronomy. He showed that a supposedly modern standard observation technique, "averted vision," was recorded nearly two and half thousand years ago by Aristotle. He also developed an interest in the architect Francis Rattenbury, designer of some of the major landmarks of British Columbia, and co-authored a major study of his career, as well as a Penguin volume on Rattenbury and the murder trial that followed his death, co-authored with the Attorney General of England and Wales, Sir Michael Havers (Baron Havers). He writes occasional pieces on Art and Archaeology for the Wall Street Journal.

== Books ==
- The Emperor Caligula in the Ancient Sources. Coauthored by John Yardley. Oxford: Oxford University Press, 2023.
- Rome is Burning: Nero and the Fire that Ended a Dynasty. Princeton: Princeton University Press, 2020.
- The Emperor Nero: a Guide to the Ancient Sources. Princeton: Princeton University Press, 2016. coauthored by John Yardley and Elaine Fantham.
- Caligula: the Abuse of Power. London: Routledge, 2015, rev. ed. of Caligula: the Corruption of Power. New Haven: Yale University Press, 1990.
- Velleius Paterculus, Roman History. Indianapolis: Hackett Publishing, 2011. Coauthored by John Yardley.
- Tacitus, Annals (Oxford: Oxford University Press. Oxford World’s Classics, 2008. Coauthored by John Yardley. ISBN 9780191539855.
- Lives of the Caesars (ed.) Oxford: Blackwell, 2008. ISBN 9781405127547.
- Livia, First Lady of Imperial Rome. New Haven: Yale University Press, 2002.
- Agrippina: Sex, Power and Politics in the Early Empire. New Haven: Yale University Press, 1996.
- Janus Pannonius. Epigrammata. Budapest: Corvina, 1985.
- The Rattenbury Case. London: Penguin Books, 1989. Coauthored by Sir Michael Havers and P. Shankland.
- Francis Rattenbury and British Columbia. Vancouver: University of British Columbia Press, 1983. Coauthored by R. Liscombe.
