= Janet Cox-Rearick =

American art historian (1930–2018)

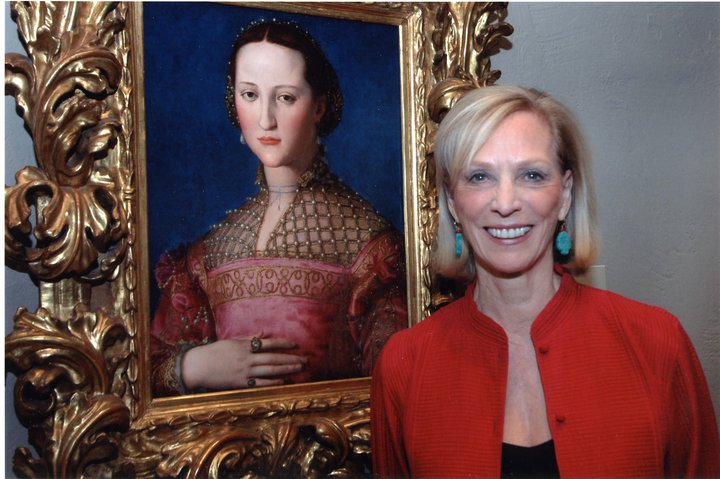
- Cox-Rearick with a portrait of Duchess Eleonora di Toledo by Agnolo Bronzino.
- Born: Janet Pearson Cox; June 28, 1930; Bronxville, New York, U.S.
- Died: November 27, 2018 (aged 88)
- Other names: Janet Cox, Janet Cox-Rearick Hitchcock, Janet Cox-Rearick Waldman
- Occupation: Art historian

Janet Cox-Rearick (June 28, 1930 – November 27, 2018) was an American art historian, Distinguished Professor of Art History at the City University of New York.

== Early life and education ==
Born Janet Pearson Cox in Bronxville, New York to Vernon Cox, a schoolmaster at St. Bernard's School in Manhattan, and Mary Bostwick Cox, a Wellesley College graduate in Art History. She attended Bronxville High School (graduating in 1948) and Wellesley College (class of 1952). Though she was working as a model and preparing for a career in fashion merchandising, her encounter with Sydney J. Freedberg, her professor at Wellesley, convinced her to follow a career in art history. She followed Freedberg to Harvard, where she did her MA and PhD under his supervision. She won a two-year Fulbright Fellowship in 1954, which led to her meeting with a young opera student, Anna Moffo, who became her lifelong friend.

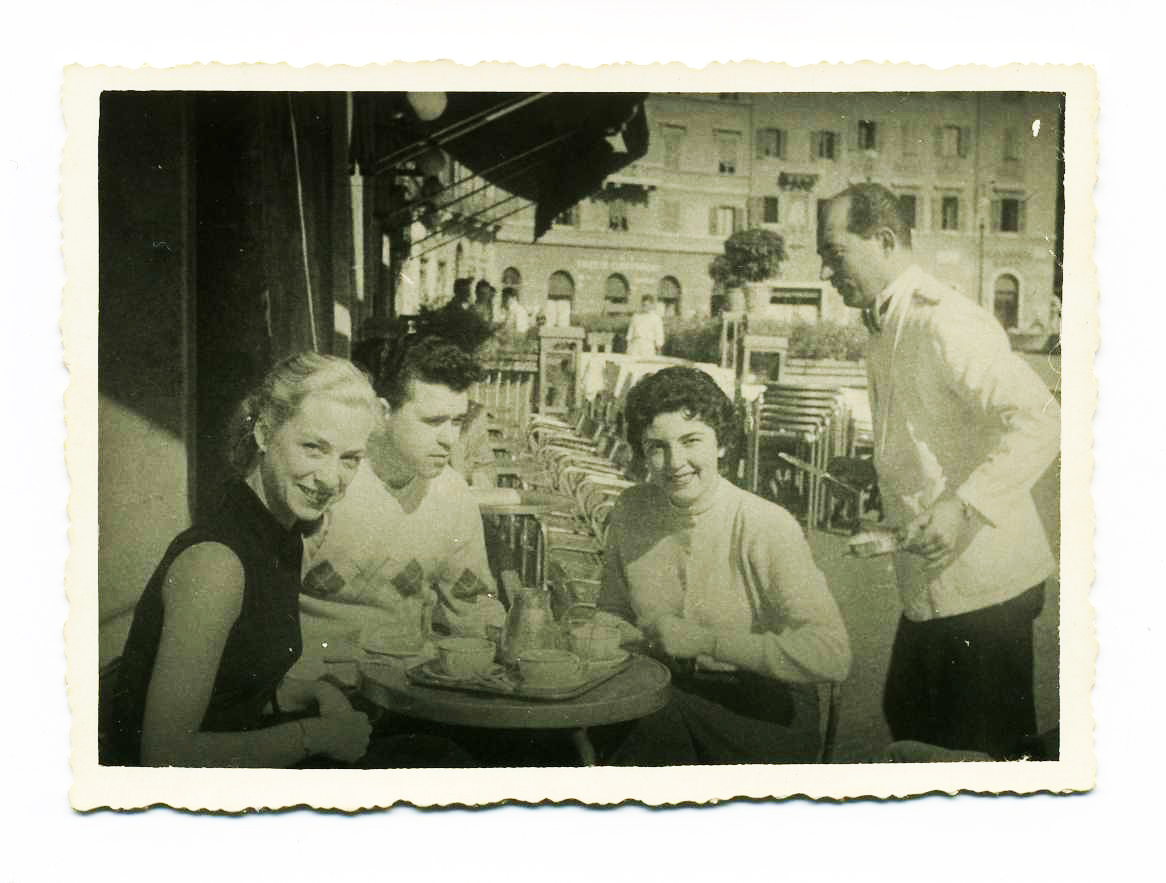
Janet Cox-Rearick with Anna Moffo in 1954 in Rome, when both were Fulbright Fellows.

In 1961–63 she was a member of the first class of Fellows to Villa I Tatti, The Harvard Center for Italian Renaissance Studies. (The other Fellows appointed in that year were Eric Cochrane, Curtis Shell, John Freccero, and David Herlihy.) She held appointments at I Tatti again in 1975–76 and 1990–91.

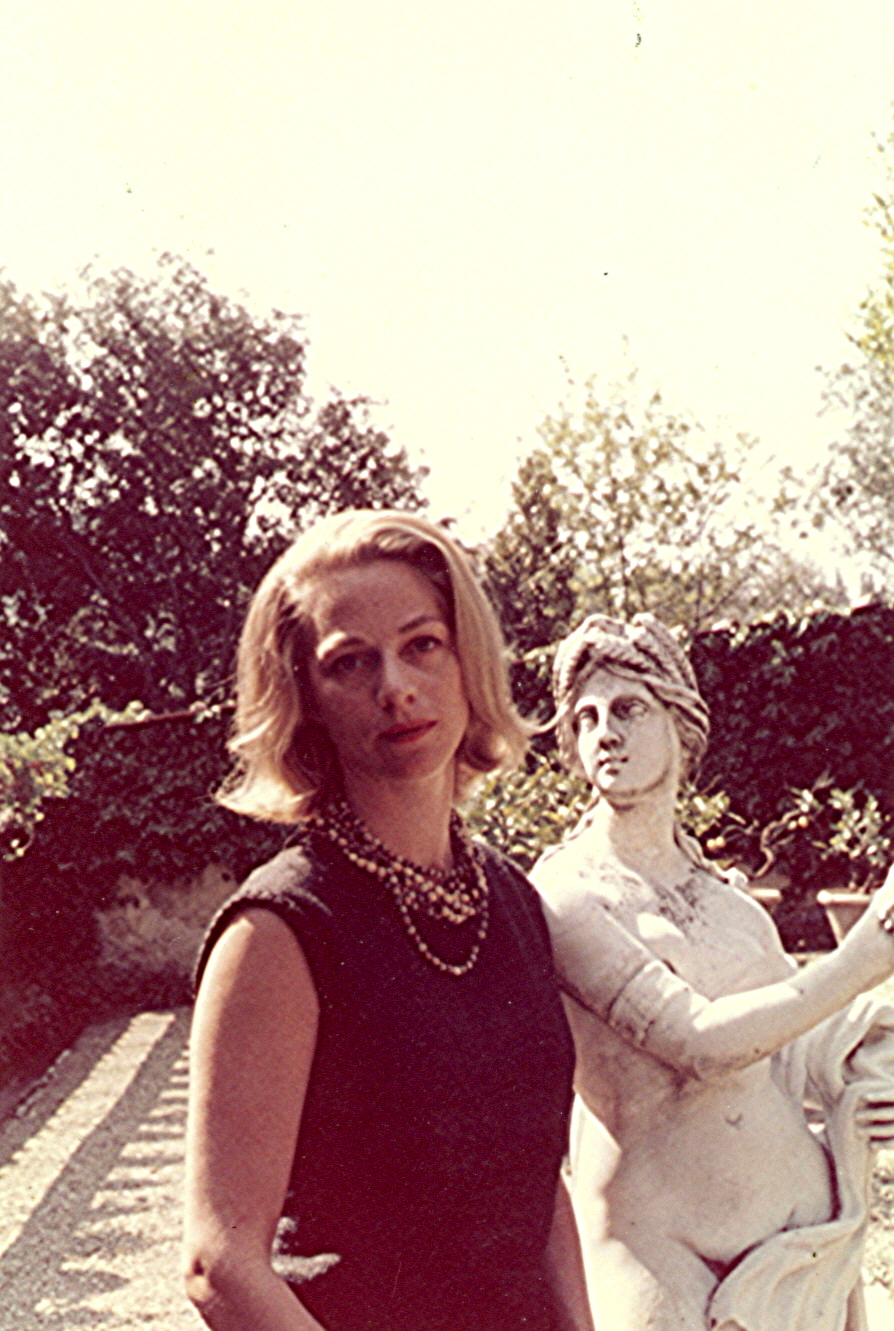
Among the first class of Fellows at Villa I Tatti. Photo taken at the Villa in May 1963.

== Scholarly work ==
Her dissertation, The Drawings of Pontormo, was published as a book (2 volumes) in 1963.

Her later books include: Dynasty and Destiny in Medici Art; Bronzino's Chapel of Eleonora in the Palazzo Vecchio; The Collections of Francois I: Royal Treasures; and Giulio Romano. She co-curated the 1999 exhibition The Drawings of Bronzino at the Metropolitan Museum of Art.

She taught at Wellesley College, then soon after graduation worked as a curator in the Department of Prints and Drawings of the Art Institute of Chicago. She then became a lecturer at the Frick Collection before being hired, on the recommendation of Leo Steinberg, to teach Italian Renaissance art at Hunter College. She remained at Hunter College for over forty years, and later taught at the Graduate Center of the City University of New York.

She received the title of Distinguished Professor from the City University of New York. For her work on Francois I, the French government awarded her a knighthood, naming her a Chevalier des Arts et des Lettres.

== Personal life ==
She married three times, first to the art historian William Roger Rearick. Her second husband was H. Wiley Hitchcock, a scholar of American music.

== Bibliography ==
- Bambach, Carmen, Janet Cox-Rearick, and George R. Goldner. The Drawings of Bronzino. New York: Metropolitan Museum of Art, 2010. ISBN 9781588393548
- Janet Cox-Rearick, and Richard Aste. Giulio Romano, Master Designer: An Exhibition of Drawings in Celebration of the Five Hundredth Anniversary of His Birth. New York: Bertha and Karl Leubsdorf Art Gallery, Hunter College of the City University of New York, 1999. ISBN 9781885998217
- Cox-Rearick, Janet,The Collection of Francis I: Royal Treasures. New York: Harry N. Abrams, 1996. ISBN 9780810940383
- Cox-Rearick, Janet. Bronzino's Chapel of Eleonora in the Palazzo Vecchio. Berkeley: University of California Press, 1993.ISBN 9780520074804 According to WorldCat, the book is held in 622 libraries
- Cox-Rearick, Janet. Dynasty and Destiny in Medici Art: Pontormo, Leo X, and the Two Cosimos. Princeton, N.J.: Princeton University Press, 1984.ISBN 9780691040233 According to WorldCat, the book is held in 484 libraries
- Cox-Rearick, Janet,The Drawings of Pontormo: A Catalogue Raisonné with Notes on the Paintings. New York: Hacker Art Books, 1981. ISBN 9780878172726
