= The Golden Bough (painting) =

1834 painting by J. M. W. Turner

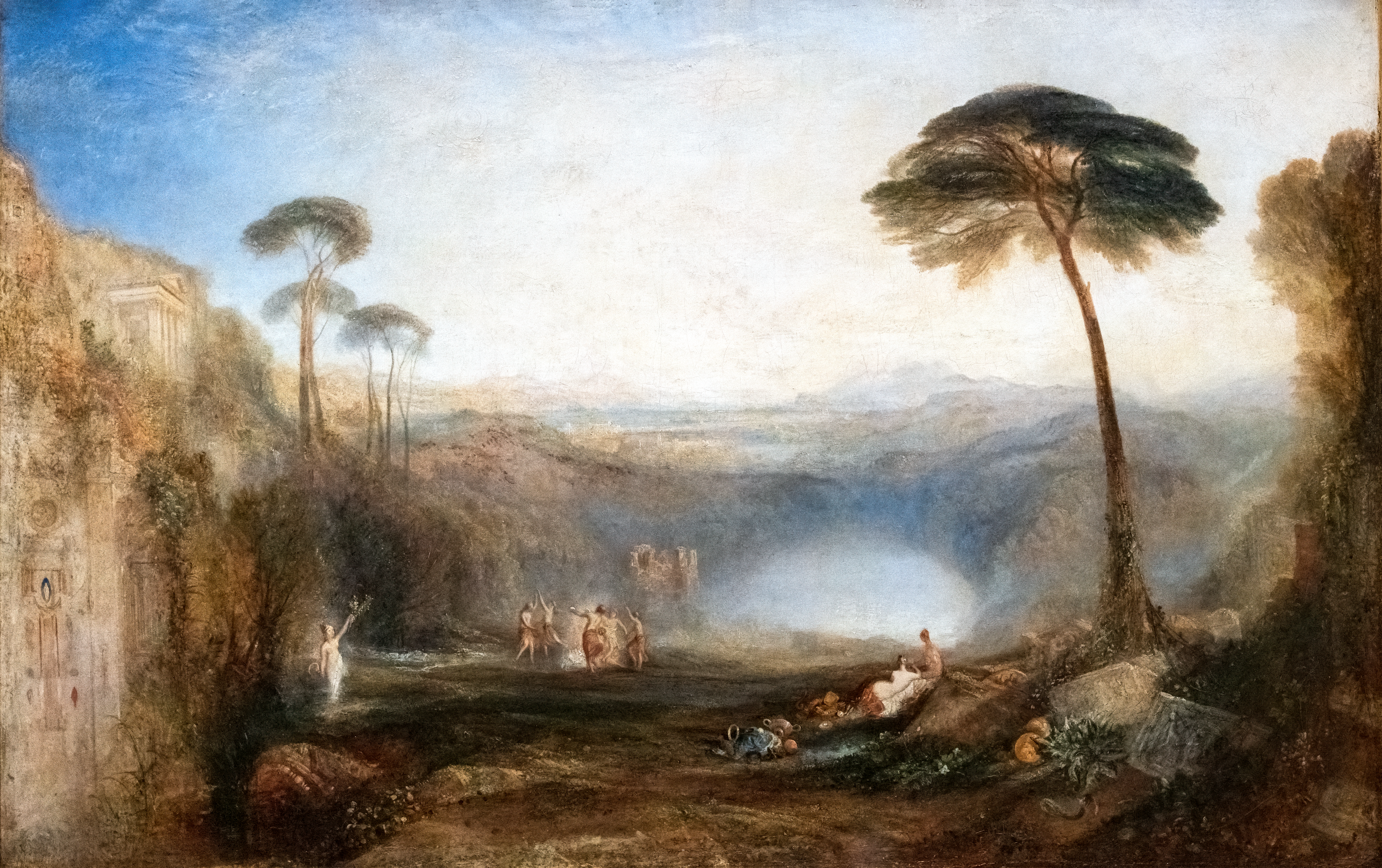
- Artist: J. M. W. Turner
- Year: 1834
- Medium: Oil on canvas
- Dimensions: 104.1 cm × 163.8 cm (41.0 in × 64.5 in)
- Location: Tate Gallery, London
- Accession: N00371
- Website: tate.org.uk/...n00371

The Golden Bough is a painting from 1834 by the English painter J. M. W. Turner. It depicts the episode of the golden bough from the Aeneid by Virgil. It is in the collection of the Tate galleries.

== Background ==
The English painter J. M. W. Turner painted several scenes based on Virgil's Aeneid, including Lake Avernus: Aeneas and the Cumaean Sibyl of 1814–1815. This painting relates to the myth of the Cumaean Sibyl, a prophetic priestess of Apollo who lived at Cumae. He painted the Sibyl again in 1823's The Bay of Baiae. to which his The Golden Bough was described by John Ruskin as a sequel.

The Golden Bough was exhibited at the Royal Academy in 1834; its imagery was based on Turner's reading of Christopher Pitt's translation of Virgil. Unlike his previous paintings based on Aeneid 6, which were probably commissioned by Sir Richard Hoare, the decision to depict the Golden Bough seems to have been Turner's own. Eric Shanes suggests that Turner was inspired by the death of his father in 1829.

== Description ==
The painting depicts a scene from book VI of the ancient Roman epic Aeneid by Virgil. Turner has used Christopher Pitt's English translation. The hero Aeneas wants to enter the Underworld to consult his dead father. The Sibyl of Cumae tells him that he needs to offer a golden bough from a sacred tree to Proserpine in order to enter. The painting shows the landscape around the lake Avernus, which is the entrance to the Underworld. The Sibyl stands to the left and holds a sickle and the cut bough. Dancing Fates in the background and a snake in the foreground forebode the mysteries of the Underworld.

Turner's painting diverges from Virgil's narrative on several points: Aeneas is not present, though the Sibyl holds up the Golden Bough, which does not leave Aeneas's possession in the Aeneid after he removes it from the tree until he deposits it in the underworld. The scene also depicts several half-dancers and two women, apparently watching them. They seem to ignore the bough itself; Shanes interprets this as a statement about the indifference of human beings, possibly towards religion or possibly towards art. He further describes the painting as a reflection on the discrepancy between the mortality of an artist and the immortality of art.

== Provenance ==
The collector Robert Vernon bought the painting before it had been exhibited publicly. It was shown at the Royal Academy of Arts in 1834. Vernon gave it to the National Gallery in 1847 as part of the Vernon Gift, and in 1929 it was transferred to the Tate Gallery. It remains in the collection of the Tate galleries, but as of 2020 was not on display.

== Legacy ==
James George Frazer evokes the painting in his book The Golden Bough (1890), which speculatively reconstructs a mental image which according to Frazer connects many myths and religious practices. Frazer placed Turner's painting as the first edition's frontispiece and discusses it in the opening paragraph:

Who does not know Turner's picture of the Golden Bough? The scene, suffused with the golden glow of imagination in which the divine mind of Turner steeped and transfigured even the fairest natural landscape, is a dream-like vision of the little woodland lake of Nemi, "Diana's Mirror", as it was called by the ancients. No one who has seen that calm water, lapped in a green hollow of the Alban hills, can ever forget it. The two characteristic Italian villages which slumber on its banks, and the equally Italian palazzo whose terraced gardens descend steeply to the lake, hardly break the stillness and even the solitariness of the scene. Dian herself might still linger by this lonely shore, still haunt these woodlands wild.

Frazer misidentified the lake depicted by Turner, which is Lake Avernus, as Lake Nemi, the site of the sanctuary of Diana Nemorensis discussed at length in his work and connected to Virgil's Golden Bough by the late antique commentator Servius. The priest at Nemi obtained his position by killing his predecessor. To challenge the priest (known as the Rex Nemorensis, or "king of the grove") for his office, a contender had to break off a branch from the grove of trees around the sanctuary, an act which was otherwise forbidden. The frontispiece was dropped from the editions of The Golden Bough printed from 1959 onwards.

As a young man, the Irish poet W. B. Yeats admired the painting, and spent long periods looking at it in the National Gallery. The Golden Bough is a prominent symbol in two of Yeats's poems, Sailing to Byzantium (1927) and Byzantium (1930), and his use of the image may allude to either or several of Turner, Frazer and Virgil.

== See also ==
- List of paintings by J. M. W. Turner
