= Jonathan Powell (classicist) =

British professor

Jonathan Powell is emeritus professor of Latin at Royal Holloway, University of London.

== Selected publications ==
- From Antiphon to Autocue: Aspects of Speechwriting Ancient and Modern, Powell, J. G. F., Rubinstein, L. & Kremmydas, C. 2016 Stuttgart: Franz Steiner Verlag.
- Profession and Performance: Aspects of Oratory in the Greco-Roman World, Kremmydas, C. (ed.), Rubinstein, L. (ed.) & Powell, J. (ed.) 11 Oct 2013 London: Institute of Classical Studies.
- "Horace, Scythia, and the East", Powell, J. 2010 in : Proceedings of the Langford Latin Seminar. 14, pp. 137–190.
- M. Tulli Ciceronis De Re Publica, De Legibus, Cato Maior de Senectute, Laelius de Amicitia: Recognovit brevique adnotatione critica instruxit, Powell, J. (Ed.) 2006 Oxford: Oxford University Press. (Oxford Classical Texts)
