= Poo Mu-chou =

Taiwanese Egyptologist (born 1952)

Mu-chou Poo (Chinese: 蒲慕州; pinyin: Pú Mùzhōu; born 1952) is a Taiwanese Egyptologist and scholar in Comparative Antiquity. Poo was born in Taiwan and obtained his undergraduate degree from National Taiwan University (1975). After receiving his PhD from Johns Hopkins University (1984), he became a research fellow at the Institute of History and Philology at Academia Sinica (1983–2009). Currently, Poo teaches at the Chinese University of Hong Kong as a professor of history.

== Bibliography ==
Poo has published works in Chinese and English. Major works include:

Books in English:

- Wine and Wine Offering in the Religion of Ancient Egypt (London: Kegan Paul International, Egyptological Series, 1995).
- In Search of Personal Welfare: A View of Ancient Chinese Religion (Albany: State University of New York Press, 1998).
- Enemies of Civilization: Attitudes toward Foreigners in Ancient Mesopotamia, Egypt and China (Albany: State University of New York Press, 2005).
- (Ed.) Rethinking Ghosts in World Religions (Leiden: Brill, 2009).

Books in Chinese:

- 世界文化史 A History of World Civilizations, 2 vols., (A textbook for the Senior High School in the Republic of China) (Taipei: National Bureau of Publication, 1986).
- 西洋文明發展史 A History of Western Civilization, Chapters 1–18, co-authored with Tuan Ch'ang-kuo, Wu Chun-i & Chuang Shang-wu, (Taipei: National Open University, 1990).
- 墓葬與生死 — 中國古代宗教之省思 Burial Styles and Ideas of Life and Death—Reflections on the Religion of Ancient China, (Taipei: Lianjing, 1993; 2nd ed., Beijing: Zhonghua shuju, 2008).
- 尼羅河畔的文采 — 古埃及文選 Literature by the Nile: An Anthology of Ancient Egyptian Literature (Taipei: Yuanliu, 1993).
- 追尋一己之福 — 中國古代的信仰世界 In Search of Personal Welfare: The World of Beliefs in Ancient China (Taipei: Yunchen, 1995; 2nd edition, Taipei: Maitian Chubanshe, 2004; Shanghai: Guji Chubanshe, 2007).
- 中國文化史 A History of Chinese Culture (co-authored with Ping-chen. Hsiung) (Taipei: Donghua, 1997).
- 法老的國度 — 古埃及文化史 The Land of the Pharaohs: A Cultural History of Ancient Egypt (Taipei: Maitian, 2001; Guilin: Guanxi Normal University Press: 2003).
- 古代宗教與信仰 Ancient Religion and Society (Taipei: National Taiwan University, 2003).
- 鬼魅神魔 — 中國通俗文化側寫 （編） (Ed.) Ghosts, Demons, Deities and Mara: A View of Chinese Common Culture (Taipei: Maitian, 2005)
- 生活與文化（編） (Ed.) Life and Culture (Beijing: Zhongguo dabaike quanshu chubanshe, 2005).
- 西洋上古史 A History of the Ancient West (Taipei: Sanmin Publishing, 2009).

== Works cited ==
- http://www.thotweb.com/pro/poo.htm
- http://www.history.cuhk.edu.hk/mcpoo.html
- von Falkenhausen, Lothar (1 January 1999). "Review of In Search of Personal Welfare: A View of Ancient Chinese Religion". Harvard Journal of Asiatic Studies. 59 (2): 598–613. doi:10.2307/2652725. JSTOR 2652725.
- Brindley, Erica (2003). "In Search of Personal Welfare: A View of Ancient Chinese Religion (review)". China Review International. 10: 233–239. doi:10.1353/cri.2004.0010.
- http://www.h-net.org/reviews/showrev.php?id=31115
- Lagerwey, John (17 September 2004). Religion and Chinese Society. Chinese University Press. ISBN 9789629961237.
- Olberding, Amy (2 January 2012). Mortality in Traditional Chinese Thought. SUNY Press. ISBN 978-1-4384-3564-0.
