= Limnaeus =

Limnaeus, Limnaios, Limnaea, Limnaee, Limnetes, or Limnagenes, meaning in Greek "inhabiting or born in a lake or marsh".

== Greek Mythology ==
It is an ancient Greek surname of several divinities who were believed either to have sprung from a lake or had their temples near a lake. Instances are, Dionysus at Athens, and Artemis at Sicyon, near Epidaurus, on the frontiers between Laconia and Messenia, near Calamae, Patrae; it is also used as a surname of nymphs that dwell in lakes or marshes.

Limnaee was the Naiad-nymph of a lake in India and daughter of the river Ganges. She had a son named Athis.

== Cities/Towns ==
- Limnaea (Λιμναία), an ancient town of Thessaly.
- Limnaea (Acarnania), a city in ancient Acarnania.

== Names ==
Limnaeus or Limnaios is also used as a name:

- Limnaeus, a general of Alexander the Great, in the battle of Malli (see Habreas)
- Limnaios son of Harpalos, a land-owner; he was given estates in Chalcidice by king Lysimachus
- Limnaios and Lysanias helped Rhodes after 226 BC earthquake
- Limnaeus, an ambassador of Philip V of Macedon (see Cycliadas)
- Saint Limnaeus, disciple of Saint Thalassius, an hermit in Syria (5th century). Theodoret records that Limnaeus had been living in this way for thirty-eight years.
- Johannes Limnaeus (Johann Wirn) (1592–1663) German professor who wrote a work entitled "Jus publicum Imperii Romano-Germanici"
- Georg Limnaeus (1554–1611) German professor of mathematics in Jena
- Toula Limnaios, a Greek choreographer

== Zoology ==
- Limnaeus is also a surname of species in zoology (i.e. Austrofundulus limnaeus, a fish, Gammarus limnaeus, an amphipod ).
