= Erichtho =

Witch in Roman literature

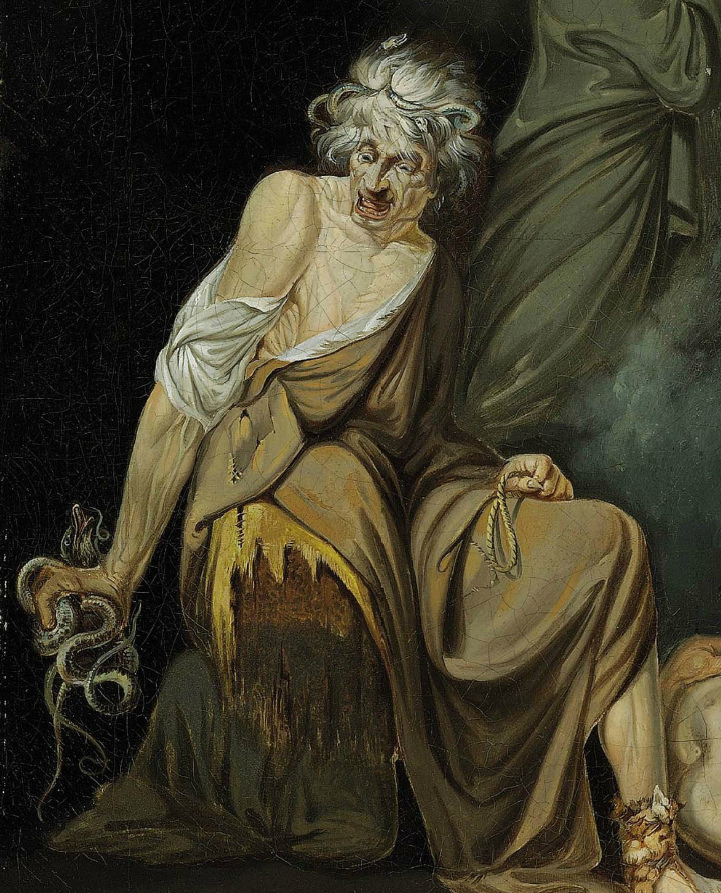
Erichtho by John Hamilton Mortimer

In Roman literature, Erichtho (from Ancient Greek: Ἐριχθώ) is a legendary Thessalian witch who appears in several literary works. She is noted for her horrifying appearance and her impious ways. Her first major role was in the Roman poet Lucan's epic Pharsalia, which details Caesar's Civil War. In the work, Pompey the Great's son, Sextus Pompeius, seeks her, hoping that she will be able to reveal the future concerning the imminent Battle of Pharsalus. In a gruesome scene, she finds a dead body, fills it with potions, and raises it from the dead. The corpse describes a civil war that is plaguing the underworld and delivers a prophecy about what fate lies in store for Pompey and his kin.

Erichtho's role in Pharsalia has often been discussed by classicists and literary scholars, with many arguing that she serves as an antithesis and counterpart to Virgil's Cumaean Sibyl, a pious prophetess who appears in his work the Aeneid. In the 14th century, the Italian poet Dante Alighieri referenced her in his Divine Comedy (wherein it is revealed that she, using magic, forced Virgil to fetch a soul from Hell's ninth circle). She also makes appearances in both Johann Wolfgang von Goethe's 19th-century play Faust, as well as John Marston's Jacobean play The Tragedy of Sophonisba.

== In literature ==
=== Origin ===
The character Erichtho may have been created by the poet Ovid, as she is mentioned in his poem Heroides XV. (Note: There is some debate as to where Erichtho first appeared. Heroides XV by Ovid features a reference to furialis Erictho. In 1848, Karl Lachmann argued that the poem itself was crafted after the publication of Lucan's Pharsalia by an unknown author in the style of Ovid. He contended that Erichtho was thus an invention of Lucan's alone. Lachmann's argument was highly influential, although S. G. De Vries eventually pointed out that Lucan could have easily lifted the name from Ovid, or that both might have taken the name from a now-lost source. De Vries's argument and A. Palmer's subsequent work on the poem suggest it is indeed the product of Ovid.) It is likely that the character was inspired by the legends of Thessalian witches developed during the Classical Greek period. According to many sources, Thessaly was notorious for being a haven for witches, and "folklore about the region has persisted with tales of witches, drugs, poisons and magical spells ever since the Roman period." However, Erichtho's popularity came several decades later, thanks to the poet Lucan, who featured her prominently in his epic poem Pharsalia, which details Caesar's Civil War.

=== Lucan's Pharsalia ===
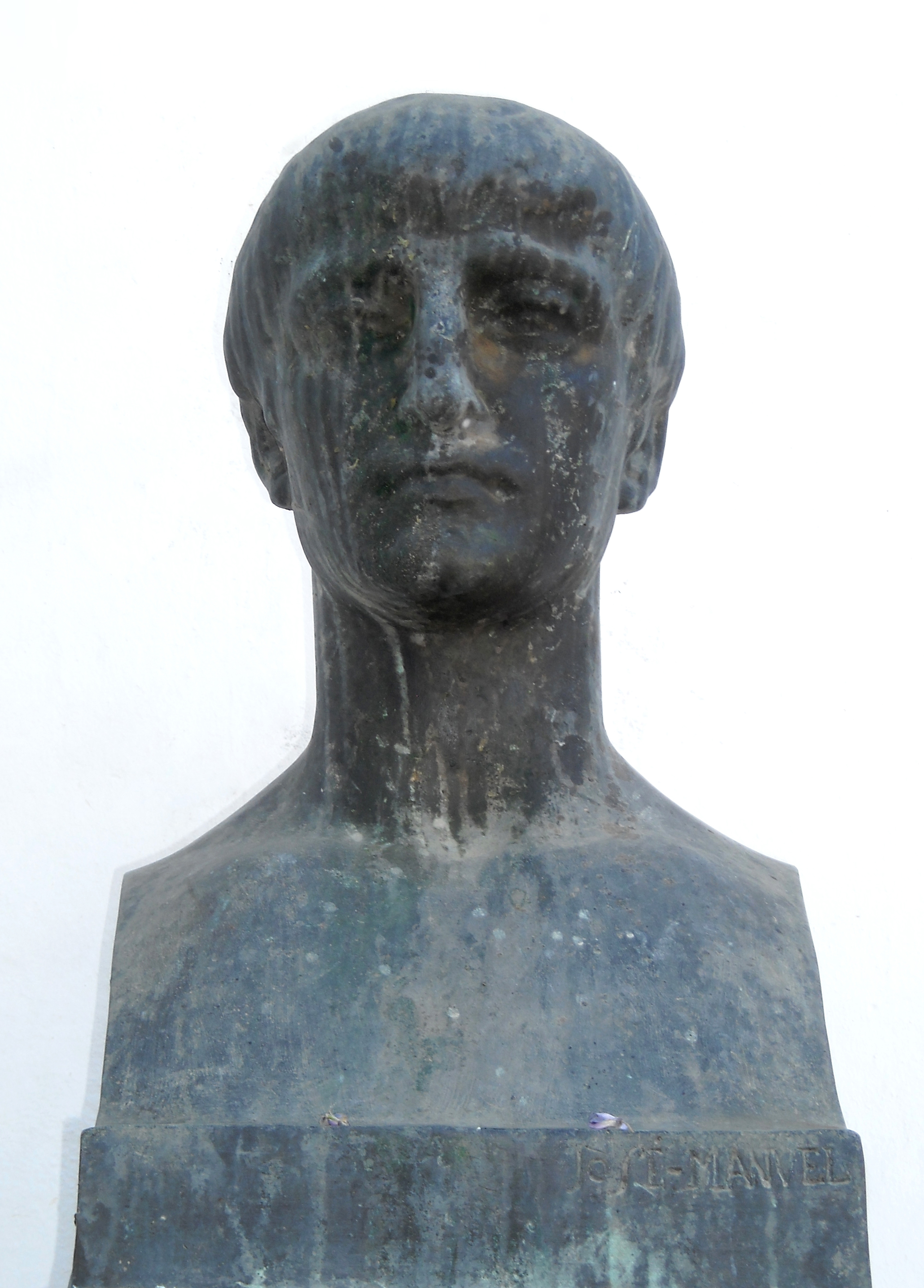
Erichtho was popularized by the Roman poet Lucan in his epic poem Pharsalia.

In Lucan's Pharsalia, Erichtho is repugnant (for instance, she is described as having a "dry cloud" hang over her head and that her breath "poisons otherwise non-lethal air"), and wicked to the point of sacrilege (e.g. "She never beseeches the gods, nor does she call the divine with a suppliant hymn"). She lives on the outskirts of society and makes her home near "graveyards, gibbets, and the battlefields copiously supplied by civil war"; she uses the body parts from these locations in her magic spells. Indeed, she delights in otherwise heinous and macabre acts involving corpses (for instance, "when the dead are confined in a sarcophagus […] then she eagerly rages every limb. She plunges her hand into the eyes, delights at digging out the congealed eyeballs, and gnaws the pallid nails on a desiccated hand.").

She is a powerful necromancer; while she is surveying dead bodies in a battlefield it is noted that "If she had tried to raise up the entire army on the field to return to war, the laws of Erebus would have yielded, and a host—pulled from the Stygian Avernus by her terrible power—would have gone to war." It is for this reason that she is sought by Pompey the Great's son, Sextus Pompeius. He wants her to perform a necromantic rite so that he might be able to learn the outcome of the Battle of Pharsalus. Erichtho complies and wanders amidst a battlefield (Note: What this battlefield is a vestige of is never made clear in the poem. Dolores O'Higgins, however, contends that it is the aftermath of the Battle of Pharsalia, and that Erichtho is effectively jumping into the future. O'Higgins argues that this bending of time is "a conscious display of the vates' power.") to seek out a cadaver with "uninjured tissues of a stiffened lung". She cleans the corpse's organs, and fills the body with a potion (consisting of, among other things, a mixture of warm blood, "lunar poison", and "everything that nature wickedly bears") so as to bring the dead body back to life. The spirit is summoned, but, at first, refuses to return to its old body. She then promptly threatens the entire universe by promising to summon "that god at whose dread name earth trembles". (Note: According to Andrew Zissos: "The identity of the deity mentioned obliquely by Erictho here has been the source of much scholarly debate. Suggestions have included the mysterious deity Demiurgus (Haskins 1887 ad loc., Pichon 1912: 192), Ahriman (Rose 1913: li–lii); Hermes Trismegistus (Bourgery 1928: 312), and Yahweh (Baldini-Moscadi 1976: 182–3). All of these identifications are plausible, but none conclusive—a point which is in itself suggestive: Lucan may have wished to avoid picking one ultimate nether deity over another, particularly given that it was acceptable practice in magical rituals not to offer a precise designation. Since aporia in divine matters is one of the conceptual pillars upon which Lucan's epic is built is, it likely that the poet is exploiting the conventional obfuscation of magical formulae for his own artistic program.") Immediately following this outburst, the corpse is reanimated and offers a bleak description of a civil war in the underworld, as well as a rather ambiguous (at least, to Sextus Pompeius) prophecy about the fate that lies in store for Pompey and his kin.

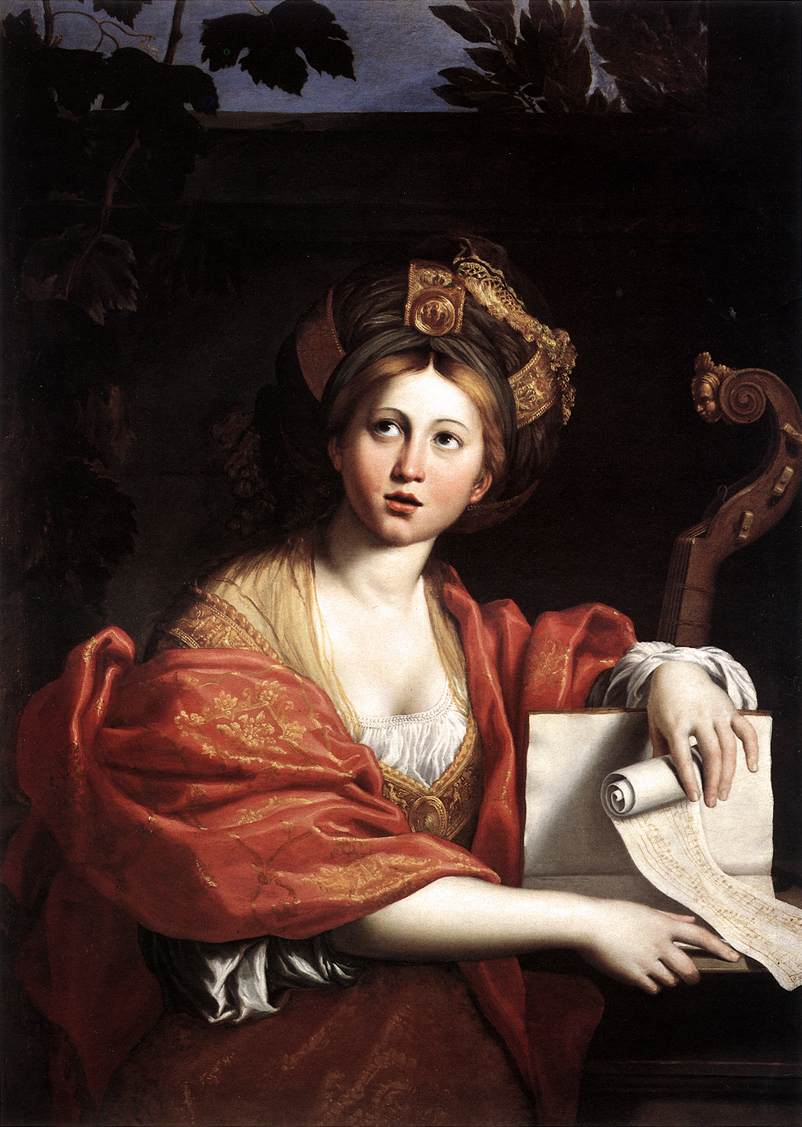
Erichtho has often been seen as antithetical counterpart to the Sibyl of Cumae, a character prominently featured in Virgil's Aeneid.

Because the sixth book of Pharsalia is seen by many scholars as being a reworking of the sixth book from Virgil's Aeneid, Erichtho is often viewed as the "antithetical counterpart to Virgil's Cumaean Sibyl. Indeed, both fulfill the role of helping a human gain information from the underworld; however, while the Sibyl is pious, Erichtho is wicked. Andrew Zissos notes:

The vast moral chasm between Erictho and the Sibyl is nicely brought out by Lucan's account of their respective preparations. While the Sibyl piously insists that the unburied corpse of Misenus (exanimum corpus, Aen. 6.149) must be properly buried before Aeneas embarks on his underworld journey, Erictho specifically requires an unburied corpse (described similarly as exanimes artus, 720) for her undertaking. As [Jamie] Masters points out, there is a clear connection between Erictho's cadaver and Virgil's Misenus. This facilitates one further inversion: whereas the Sibyl's rites begin within a burial, Erictho's conclude with a burial.

Masters, as Zissos points out, argues that the Sibyl's commands to bury Misenus and find the Golden Bough are inverted and compacted in Lucan: Erichtho needs a body—not buried—but rather retrieved. Many other parallels and inversions abound, including: the difference of opinions about the ease of getting what is sought from the underworld (the Sibyl says only the initial descent to the underworld will be easy, whereas Erichtho says necromancy is simple), the opposing manner in which those seeking information from the underworld are described (the Sibyl urges Aeneas to be courageous, whereas Erichtho criticizes Sextus Pompeius for being cowardly), and the inverted manner in which the supernatural rites proceed (the Sibyl sends Aeneas underground to gain knowledge, whereas Erichtho conjures a spirit up out of the ground to learn the future).

=== Dante's Inferno ===
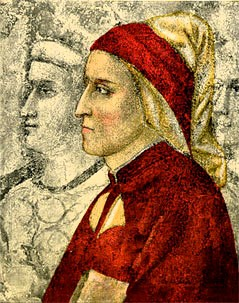
Erichtho is mentioned by name in Dante Alighieri's work Inferno.

Erichtho is also mentioned by name in the first book of Dante Alighieri's Divine Comedy, Inferno: in Canto IX, Dante and Virgil are initially denied access to the gates of Dis, and so Dante, doubting his guide and hoping for confirmation, asks Virgil if he has ever travelled to the depths of Hell before. Virgil responds in the affirmative, explaining that at one point he had journeyed to the lowest circle of Hell on behest of Erichtho in order to retrieve a soul for one of her necromantic rites. Simon A. Gilson notes that such a story is "without precedent in medieval sources, and highly problematic".

Explanations for this passage have abounded, some of which argue that the passage is either a mere "hermeneutic contrivance", a purposeful tactic on the part of Dante to undermine the reader's sense of Virgil's authority, an allusion to a medieval legend about Virgil, a reworking of medieval concepts about necromancy, a literary parallel to Christ's Harrowing of Hell, simply an echo of Virgil's supposed knowledge of Hell (based on his description of the underworld in the Aeneid, 6.562–565), or merely a reference to the aforementioned episode from Lucan. Gilson contends that the reference to Erichtho reinforces the fact "that Dante's own journey through Hell is divinely willed," although "this is achieved at the expense of the earlier necromantically inspired journey undertaken by Virgil." Similarly, Rachel Jacoff argues:

Dante's rewriting of the Lucanian scene 'recuperates' the witch Erichtho by making her necessary to the Dantean Virgil's status as guide: she thus functions in accord with the Christian providence that controls the advancement of the Commedia's plot line. At the same time, the Lucanian Erichtho is both marginalized and subordinated to a higher power. In this sense, Dante's rewriting of Erichtho also undoes Lucan's subversion of the original Virgilian model.

Although it was a literary anachronism to associate Lucan's Erichtho (who summoned a shade to foretell the Battle of Pharsalus in 48 BC) with the shade of Virgil (who would not die until 19 BC), this connection successfully plays upon the popular medieval belief that Virgil himself was a magician and prophet.

=== Other ===
Erichtho is also a character in Johann Wolfgang von Goethe's 19th-century play Faust. She appears in Part 2, Act 2, as the first character to speak in the Classical Walpurgisnacht scene. Erichtho's speech takes the form of a soliloquy, in which she references the Battle of Pharsalia, Julius Caesar, and Pompey. She also alludes to Lucan, claiming that she is "not so abominable as the wretched poets [i.e. Lucan and Ovid] painted me." This scene immediately precedes the entrance of Mephistopheles, Faust, and Homunculus to the rites that result in Faust's Dream Life Sequence as a knight living in a castle with Helen of Troy—until the death of their child shatters the fantasy and Faust returns to the physical world for the conclusion of the play.

In John Marston's Jacobean play The Tragedy of Sophonisba, which is set during the Second Punic War, the prince of Libya, Syphax, summons Erictho [sic] from Hell, and he asks her to make Sophonisba, a Carthaginian princess, love him. Erichto, via the "power of sound", casts a spell that causes her to take on the likeness of Sophonisba; she subsequently has sexual intercourse with Syphax before he is able to realize her identity. Many critics, according to Harry Harvey Wood, "have dismissed [this scene] as revolting."

== Bibliography ==
- Clark, Brian (November 28, 2011), The Witches of Thessaly (PDF), History of the Ancient World, archived from the original (PDF) on March 7, 2016
- Alighieri, Dante (1961). The Divine Comedy 1: Inferno. Translated by Sinclair, John. Oxford, UK: Oxford University Press. ISBN 9780195004120.
- Alighieri, Dante (1995). Dante's Inferno: The Indiana Critical Edition. Translated by Musa, Mark. Bloomington, IN: Indiana University Press. ISBN 9780253209306.
- Gilson, Simon (2001). "Medieval Magical Lore and Dante's 'Commedia': Divination and Demonic Agency". Dante Studies (119): 27–66. JSTOR 40166612. (subscription required)
- Goethe, Johann (1912). Goethe's Faust: Parts I and II. Translated by Latham, Albert George. London, UK: J. M. Dent & Sons.
- Goethe, Johann (1897). Goethes Faust, Part 2. Translated by Thomas, Calvin. Boston, MA: D. C. Heath & Company.
- Kyriakidēs, Stratēs; De Martino, Francesco (2004). "Middles in Latin Poetry". Le Rane. 38. Levante.
- Jacoff, Rachel (1993). The Cambridge Companion to Dante. Cambridge, UK: Cambridge University Press. ISBN 9780521427425.
- Love, Genevieve (2003). "'As from the Waste of Sophonisba'; or, What's Sexy about Stage Directions". Renaissance Drama. 23: 3–31. doi:10.1086/rd.32.41917374. JSTOR 41917374. S2CID 192962038. (subscription required)
- Masters, Jamie (1992). Poetry and Civil War in Lucan's Bellum Civile. Cambridge, UK: Cambridge University Press. ISBN 9780521414609.
- O'Higgins, Dolores (October 1988). "Lucan as 'Vates'". Classical Antiquity. 7 (2): 208–226. doi:10.2307/25010888. JSTOR 25010888. (subscription required)
- Solomon, Jon (March 2012). "Boccaccio and the Ineffable, Aniconic God Demogorgon". International Journal of the Classical Tradition. 19 (1): 31–62. doi:10.1007/s12138-012-0307-2. JSTOR 23352461. S2CID 170394501. (subscription required)
- Thorsen, Thea (2014). Ovid's Early Poetry: From his Single Heroides to his Remedia Amoris. Cambridge, UK: Cambridge University Press. ISBN 9781107040410.
- Wiggins, Martin (2015). British Drama (1533-1642): A Catalogue. Oxford, UK: Oxford University Press. ISBN 9780198719236.
- Wood, Harry Harvey (1938). The Plays of John Marston, Volume 2. Edinburgh, UK: Oliver and Boyd.
