= Capo Miseno Lighthouse =

Lighthouse in Campania, Italy

Capo Miseno
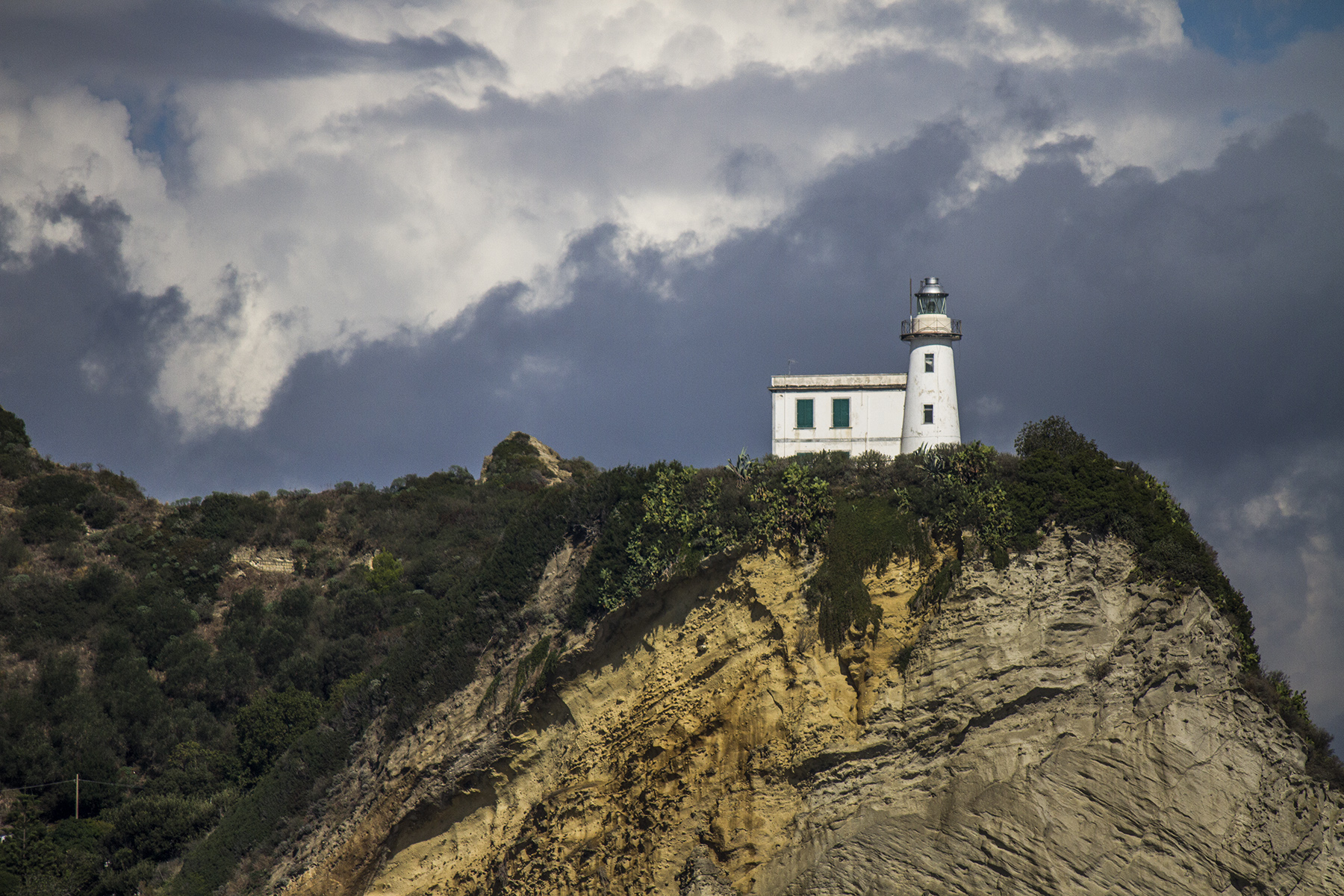
- Capo Miseno Lighthouse
- Location: Capo Miseno; Bacoli; Campania; Italy
- Coordinates: 40°46′42″N 14°05′21″E

Tower
- Constructed: 1856 (first)
- Construction: masonry tower
- Height: 12 metres (39 ft)
- Shape: cylindrical tower with balcony and lantern attached to the seaward corner of a 2-storey keeper’s house
- Markings: white tower
- Operator: Marina Militare

Light
- First lit: 1954 (current)
- Focal height: 80 metres (260 ft)
- Lens: Type OF; Focal length: 250mm
- Intensity: AL 1000 W
- Range: main: 16 nautical miles (30 km; 18 mi) reserve: 12 nautical miles (22 km; 14 mi)
- Characteristic: Fl (2) W 10s.
- Italy no.: 2402 E.F.

Capo Miseno Lighthouse (Italian: Faro di Capo Miseno) is an active lighthouse located at the end of the promontory, with the same name, that marks the north-western limit of the Gulf of Naples as well as the Gulf of Pozzuoli toward the Tyrrhenian Sea in the province of Naples.

== Description ==
The first lighthouse was built in 1869, than rebuilt in 1953. It consists of a white cylindrical tower, 12 feet (3.7 m) high, with balcony and lantern, attached to the seaward corner of a 2-storey white keeper's house. The lantern, painted in grey metallic, is positioned at 80 metres (260 ft) above sea level and emits two white flashes in a 10 seconds period, visible up to a distance of 16 nautical miles (30 km; 18 mi). The lighthouse is completely automated, powered by a solar unit and is operated by the Marina Militare with the identification code number 2402 E.F.

== See also ==
- List of lighthouses in Italy
- Capo Miseno
