= Cape Miseno =

Headland in southern Italy

Capo Miseno
- Headland
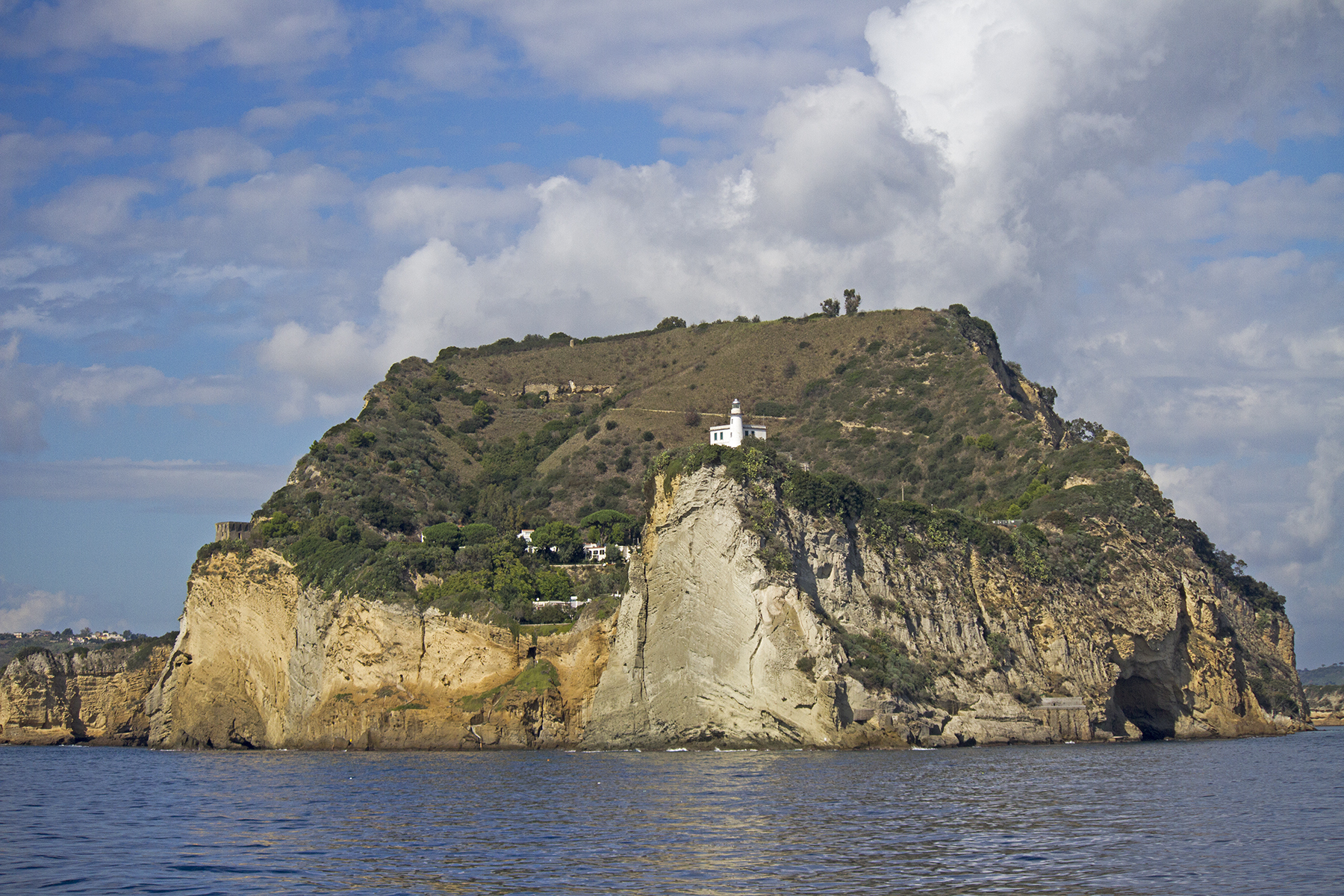
- View of Capo Miseno

- Location in Campania Capo Miseno (Italy)
- Coordinates: 40.77771°N 14.08941°E
- Location: Campania, Italy
- Water bodies: Gulf of Naples, Bay of Pozzuoli

Cape Miseno (Italian: Capo Miseno, Latin: Misenum, Ancient Greek: Μισήνον) is the headland that marks the northwestern limit of the Gulf of Naples as well as the Bay of Pozzuoli in southern Italy. The town of Miseno is located on the north side of the cape. It is the location of the Capo Miseno Lighthouse.

The cape is directly across from the island of Procida and is named for Misenus, a character in Virgil's Aeneid.

== History ==
Historically, the cape was important to the Romans since it was a natural shelter for passage into the inner harbour of Portus Julius, the temporary home port for the Roman western imperial fleet from 33 BC. It was more important when Misenum became the new home for the fleet where it remained.

Mythologically, important sections of the Aeneid play out in the Gulf of Naples: This is where Aeneas' comrade, Misenus, master of the sea-horn (the conch-shell) made "the waves ring" with his music and challenged the sea-god Triton to musical battle. He was dashed into the sea and killed by "jealous Triton". Then:

"...Pious Aeneas
sets up a mighty tomb above Misenus
bearing his arms, a trumpet, and an oar;
it stands beneath a lofty promontory,
now known as Cape Misenus after him:
it keeps a name that lasts through all the ages."

(trans. Allen Mandelbaum. The Aeneid. Bantam. 1981)
