= Pharsalia =

Roman epic poem by Lucan about Caesar's Civil War

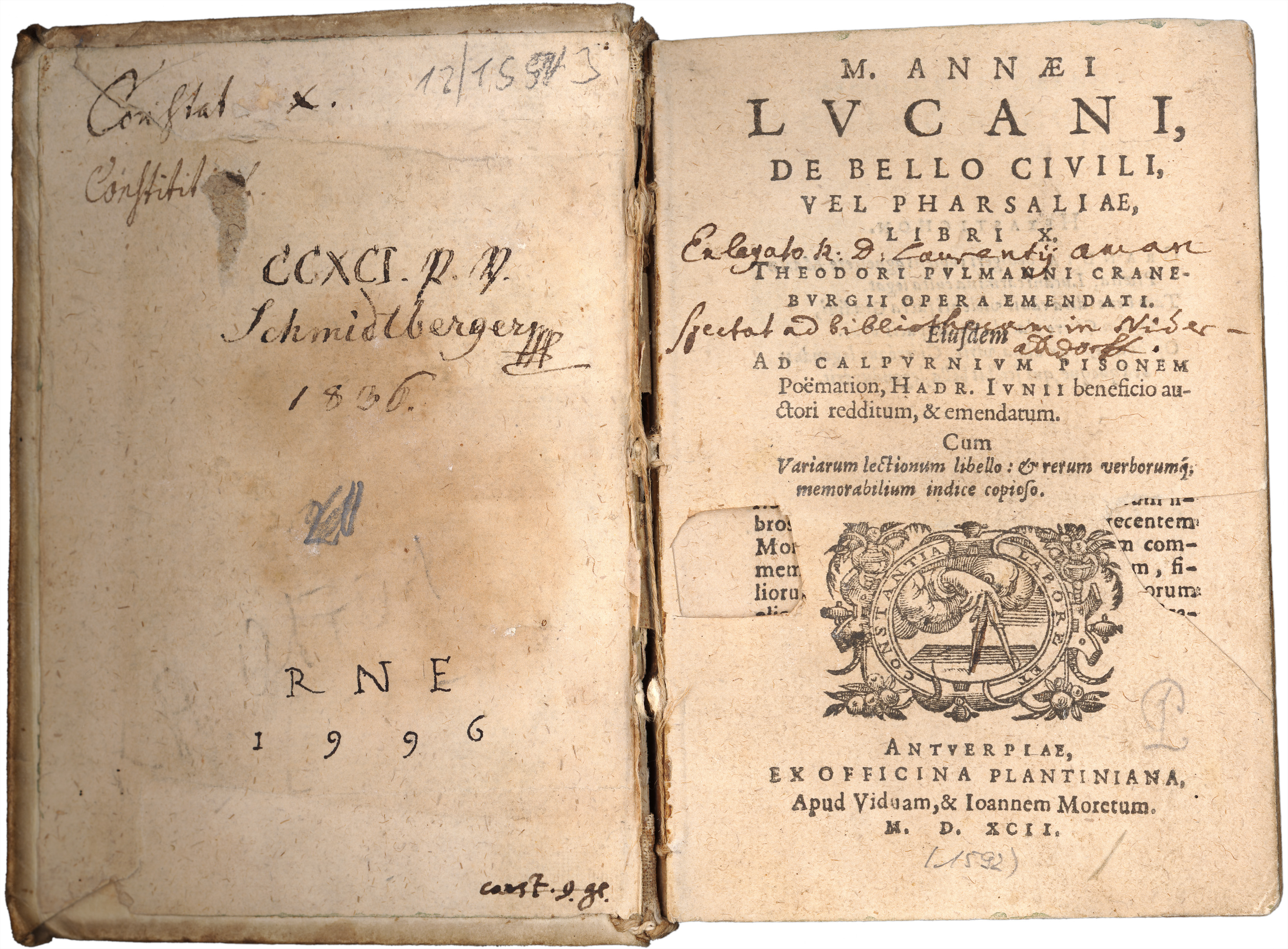
The Pharsalia was especially popular in times of civil wars and similar troubles; for example the editor of this 1592 edition, Theodor Pulmann, explains Lucan's relevance by the French Wars of Religion (1562–98).

De Bello Civili (Latin pronunciation: [deː ˈbɛlloː kiːˈwiːliː]; On the Civil War), more commonly referred to as the Pharsalia (Latin: [pʰarˈsaːlia], feminine singular (Note: Pharsalia nostra / vīvet et ā nūllō tenebrīs damnābimur aevō 9.880-6)), is a Roman epic poem written by the poet Lucan, detailing the civil war between Julius Caesar and the forces of the Roman Senate led by Pompey the Great. The poem's title is a reference to the Battle of Pharsalus, which occurred in 48 BC near Pharsalus, Thessaly, in Northern Greece. Caesar decisively defeated Pompey in this battle, which occupies all of the epic's seventh book. In the early twentieth century, translator J. D. Duff, while arguing that "no reasonable judgment can rank Lucan among the world's great epic poets", notes that the work is notable for Lucan's decision to eschew divine intervention and downplay supernatural occurrences in the events of the story. Scholarly estimation of Lucan's poem and poetry has since changed, as explained by commentator Philip Hardie in 2013: "In recent decades, it has undergone a thorough critical re-evaluation, to re-emerge as a major expression of Neronian politics and aesthetics, a poem whose studied artifice enacts a complex relationship between poetic fantasy and historical reality."

== Origins ==
The poem was begun around AD 61 and several books were in circulation before the Emperor Nero and Lucan had a bitter falling out. Lucan continued to work on the epic – despite Nero's prohibition against any publication of Lucan's poetry – and it was left unfinished when Lucan was compelled to suicide as part of the Pisonian conspiracy in AD 65. In total, ten books were written and all survive; the tenth book breaks off abruptly with Caesar in Egypt.

== Contents ==
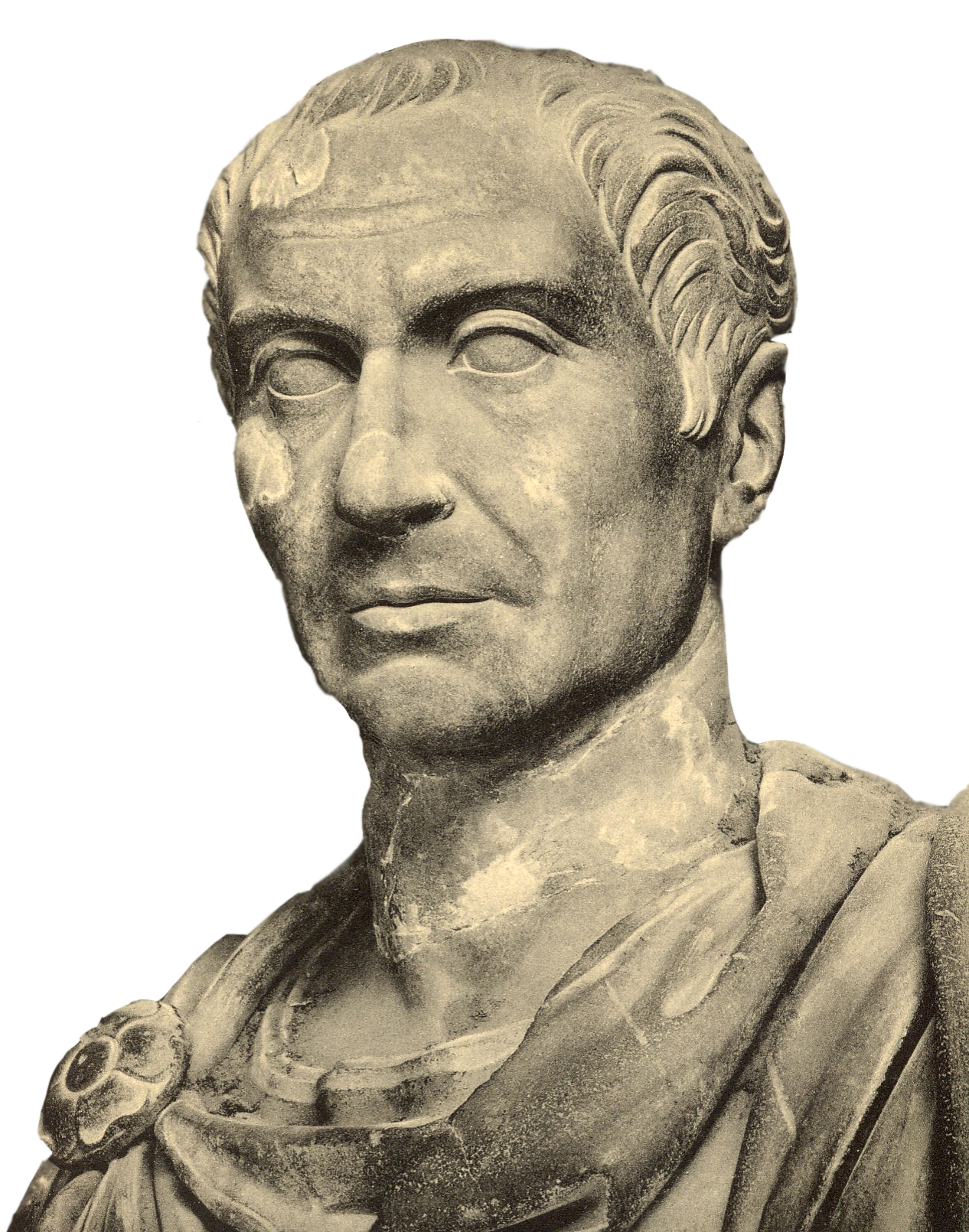
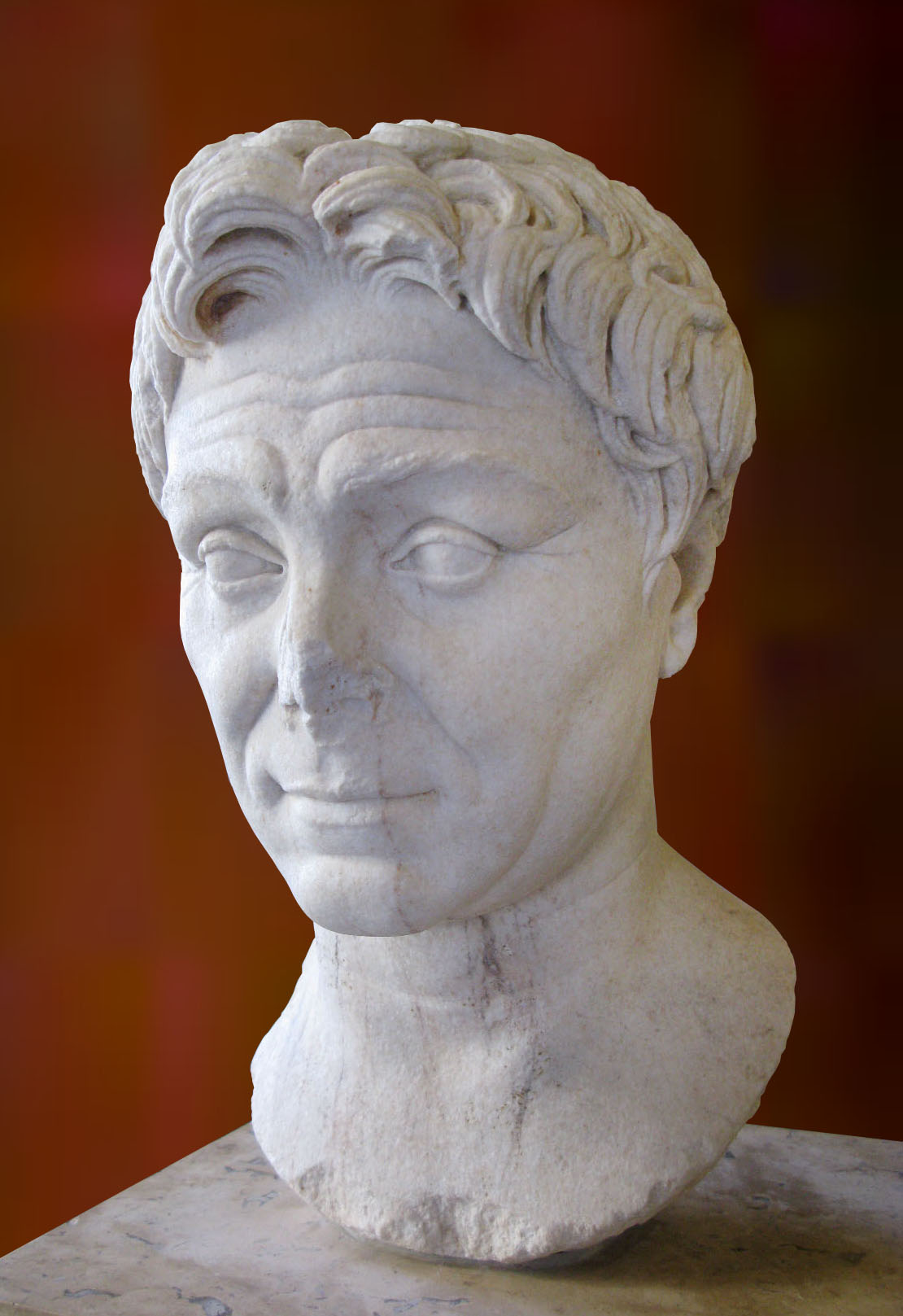
The Pharsalia details the civil war between Julius Caesar (left) and Pompey the Great (right).

=== Overview ===
Book 1: After a brief introduction lamenting the idea of Romans fighting Romans and an ostensibly flattering dedication to Nero, the narrative summarizes background material leading up to the present war and introduces Caesar in northern Italy. Despite an urgent plea from the Spirit of Rome to lay down his arms, Caesar crosses the Rubicon, rallies his troops and marches south to Rome, joined by Curio along the way. The book closes with panic in the city, terrible portents and visions of the disaster to come.

Book 2: In a city overcome by despair, an old veteran presents a lengthy interlude regarding the previous civil war that pitted Marius against Sulla. Cato the Younger is introduced as a heroic man of principle; as abhorrent as civil war is, he argues to Brutus that it is better to fight than do nothing. After siding with Pompey—the lesser of two evils—he remarries his ex-wife, Marcia, and heads to the field. Caesar continues south through Italy and is delayed by Domitius' brave resistance. He attempts a blockade of Pompey at Brundisium, but the general makes a narrow escape to Greece.

Book 3: As his ships sail, Pompey is visited in a dream by Julia, his dead wife and Caesar's daughter. Caesar returns to Rome and plunders the city, while Pompey reviews potential foreign allies. Caesar then heads for Spain, but his troops are detained at the lengthy siege of Massilia (Marseille). The city ultimately falls in a bloody naval battle.

Book 4: The first half of this book is occupied with Caesar's victorious campaign in Spain against Afranius and Petreius. Switching scenes to Pompey, his forces intercept a raft carrying Caesarians, who prefer to kill each other rather than be taken prisoner. The book concludes with Curio launching an African campaign on Caesar's behalf, where he is defeated and slain by the African King Juba.

Book 5: The Senate in exile confirms Pompey the true leader of Rome. Appius consults the Delphic Oracle to learn of his fate in the war, and leaves with a misleading prophecy. In Italy, after defusing a mutiny, Caesar marches to Brundisium and sails across the Adriatic to meet Pompey's army. Only a portion of Caesar's troops complete the crossing when a storm prevents further transit; he tries to personally send a message back but is himself nearly drowned. Finally, the storm subsides, and the armies face each other at full strength. With battle at hand, Pompey sends his wife to the island of Lesbos.

Book 6: Pompey's troops force Caesar's armies – featuring the heroic centurion Scaeva – to fall back to Thessaly. Lucan describes the wild Thessalian terrain as the armies wait for battle the next day. The remainder of the book follows Pompey's son Sextus, who wishes to know the future. He finds the most powerful witch in Thessaly, Erichtho, and she reanimates the corpse of a dead soldier in a terrifying ceremony. The soldier predicts Pompey's defeat and Caesar's eventual assassination.

Book 7: The soldiers are pressing for battle, but Pompey is reluctant until Cicero convinces him to attack. The Caesarians are victorious, and Lucan laments the loss of liberty. Caesar is especially cruel as he mocks the dying Domitius and forbids cremation of the dead Pompeians. The scene is punctuated by a description of wild animals gnawing at the corpses, and a lament from Lucan for Thessalia, infelix – ill-fated Thessaly.

Book 8: Pompey himself escapes to Lesbos, reunites with his wife, then goes to Cilicia to consider his options. He decides to enlist aid from Egypt, but King Ptolemy is fearful of retribution from Caesar and plots to murder Pompey when he lands. Pompey suspects treachery; he consoles his wife and rows alone to the shore, meeting his fate with Stoic poise. His headless body is flung into the ocean, but washes up on shore and receives a humble burial from Cordus.

Book 9: Pompey's wife mourns her husband as Cato takes up leadership of the Senate's cause. He plans to regroup and heroically marches the army across Africa to join forces with King Juba, a trek that occupies most of the middle section of the book. On the way, he passes an oracle but refuses to consult it, citing Stoic principles. Caesar visits Troy and pays respects to his ancestral gods. A short time later he arrives in Egypt; when Ptolemy's messenger presents him with the head of Pompey, Caesar feigns grief to hide his joy at Pompey's death.

Book 10: Caesar arrives in Egypt, where he is beguiled by Ptolemy's sister, Cleopatra. A banquet is held; Pothinus, Ptolemy's cynical and bloodthirsty chief minister, plots an assassination of Caesar, but is killed in his surprise attack on the palace. A second attack comes from Ganymede, an Egyptian noble, and the poem breaks off abruptly as Caesar is fighting for his life.

=== Completeness ===
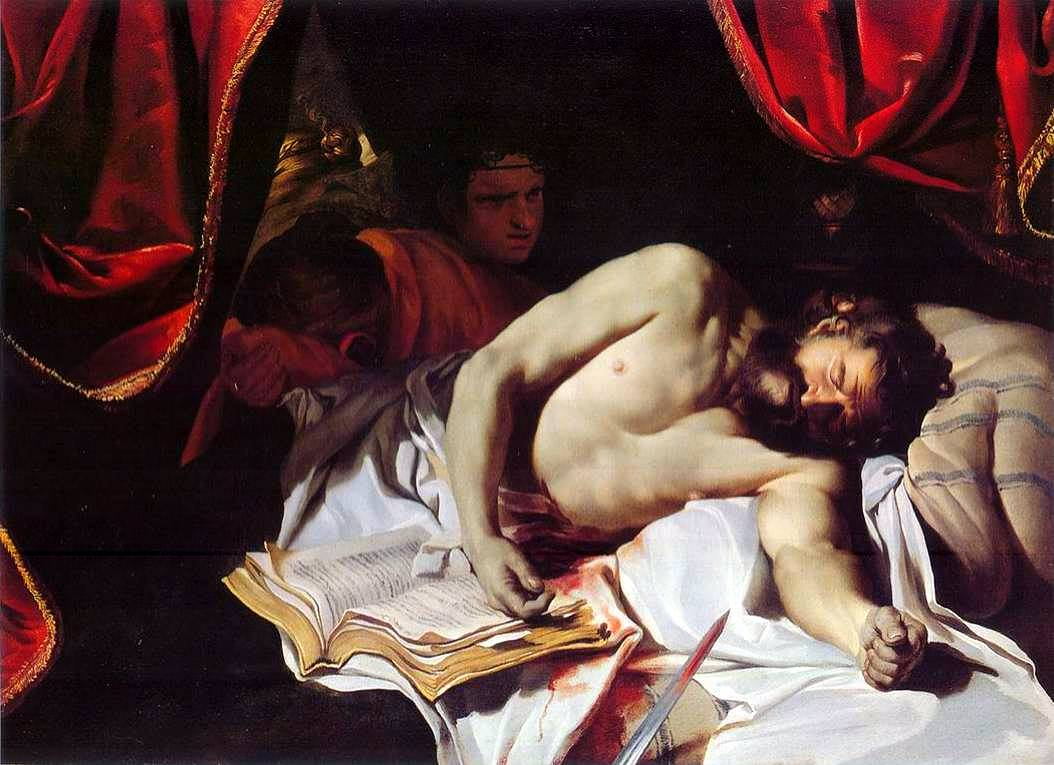
Susanna Braund argues that, were the poem to have been finished, it would have ended with Cato's death.

Almost all scholars agree that the Pharsalia as we now have it is unfinished. Some debate exists, however, as to whether the poem was unfinished at the time of Lucan's death, or if the final few books of the work were lost at some point. Susanna Braund notes that little evidence has been found one way or the other, and that this question must "remain a matter of speculation". Some argue that Lucan intended to end his poem with the Battle of Philippi (42 BC) or the Battle of Actium (31 BC). Both these hypotheses seem unlikely, as they would have required Lucan to pen a work many times larger than what is extant: for instance, the ten-book poem we have today covers a total time of twenty months; were the poet to have continued this pace, his work would cover a time span of six to seventeen years, which scholars consider unlikely. An alternative considered "more attractive" by Braund is that Lucan intended for his poem to be sixteen books long and to end with the assassination of Caesar. This theory, too, has its problems, namely that Lucan would have been required to introduce and rapidly develop characters to replace Pompey and Cato. It also might have given the work a "happy ending", which seems inconsistent, tonally, with the poem as a whole. Ultimately, Braund argues that the best hypothesis is that Lucan's original intent was a twelve-book poem, mirroring the length of the Aeneid. The best internal argument for this is that in his sixth book Lucan features a necromantic ritual that parallels and inverts many of the motifs found in Virgil's sixth book (which details Aeneas' consultation with the Sibyl and his subsequent descent into the underworld). Had the book been extended to twelve books, Braund contends that it would have ended with the death of Cato, and his subsequent apotheosis as a Stoic hero.

Conversely, the Latinist Jamie Masters argues the opposite, that the finale of Book 10 is indeed the ending to the work as Lucan intended. Masters devotes an entire chapter to this hypothesis in his book Poetry and Civil War in Lucan's Bellum Civile (1992), arguing that by being open-ended and ambiguous, the poem's conclusion avoids "any kind of resolution, but [still] preserves the unconventional premises of its subject-matter: evil without alternative, contradiction without compromise, civil war without end".

=== Title ===
The poem is popularly known as the Pharsalia, largely due to lines 985–986 in Book 9, which read, Pharsalia nostra / Vivet ("Our Pharsalia shall live on"). However, many scholars, such as J. D. Duff and Braund, note that this is a recent name given to the work, and that the earliest manuscripts of the poem refer to it as De Bello Civili (Concerning the Civil War). Braund further argues that calling the poem Pharsalia "excessively ... privilege[s] ... an episode which occupies only one book and occurs in the centre of the poem, rather than at its climax."

=== Style ===
Lucan is heavily influenced by Latin poetic tradition, most notably Ovid's Metamorphoses and of course Virgil's Aeneid, the work to which the Pharsalia is most naturally compared. Lucan frequently appropriates ideas from Virgil's epic and "inverts" them to undermine their original, heroic purpose. Sextus' visit to the Thracian witch Erichtho provides an example; the scene and language clearly reference Aeneas' descent into the underworld (also in Book VI), but while Virgil's description highlights optimism toward the future glories of Rome under Augustan rule, Lucan uses the scene to present a bitter and gory pessimism concerning the loss of liberty under the coming empire.

Like all Silver Age poets, Lucan received the rhetorical training common to upper-class young men of the period. The suasoria – a school exercise where students wrote speeches advising an historical figure on a course of action – no doubt inspired Lucan to compose some of the speeches found in the text. Lucan also follows the Silver Age custom of punctuating his verse with short, pithy lines or slogans known as sententiae, a rhetorical tactic used to grab the attention of a crowd interested in oratory as a form of public entertainment. Quintilian singles out Lucan as a writer clarissimus sententiis – "most famous for his sententiae", and for this reason magis oratoribus quam poetis imitandus – "(he is) to be imitated more by orators than poets". His style makes him unusually difficult to read.

Finally, in another break with Golden Age literary techniques, Lucan is fond of discontinuity. He presents his narrative as a series of discrete episodes often without any transitional or scene-changing lines, much like the sketches of myth strung together in Ovid's Metamorphoses. The poem is more naturally organized on principles such as aesthetic balance or correspondence of scenes between books rather than the need to follow a story from a single narrative point of view. Lucan was considered among the ranks of Homer and Virgil.

== Themes ==
=== Horrors of civil war ===
Lucan emphasizes the despair of his topic in the poem's first seven lines (the same length as the opening to Virgil's Aeneid): (Note: A controversy has erupted about whether the first seven lines of the poem were written by Lucan, or if they were added after his death by someone close to him. Suetonius contended that either Seneca the Younger or Lucan's brother was the one who added the lines, so that the poem did not begin abruptly with the exclamation Quis furor ("What horror"). Others have suggested that the lines were written to replace the encomium to Nero after the poet had cooled to the emperor. Gian Biagio Conte, however, repudiates these ideas, echoing the arguments of the classicist E. Malcovati that the poem was intended to recall the openings to both the Aeneid and the Iliad. Conte further argues that Lucan's first seven lines and the line beginning Quis furor (i.e. line 8) form one "compositional thrust".)

Bella per Emathios plus quam civilia campos
iusque datum sceleri canimus, populumque potentem
in sua victrici conversum viscera dextra
cognatasque acies, et rupto foedere regni
certatum totis concussi viribus orbis
in commune nefas, infestisque obvia signis
signa, pares aquilas et pila minantia pilis.

Translation:

Wars worse than civil on Emathian plains,
and crime let loose we sing; how Rome's high race
plunged in her vitals her victorious sword;
armies akin embattled, with the force
of all the shaken earth bent on the fray;
and burst asunder, to the common guilt,
a kingdom's compact; eagle with eagle met,
standard to standard, spear opposed to spear.

— from the 1896 Sir Edward Ridley translation

Events throughout the poem are described in terms of insanity and sacrilege. Far from glorious, the battle scenes are portraits of bloody horror, where nature is ravaged to build terrible siege engines and wild animals tear mercilessly at the flesh of the dead.

=== Flawed characters ===
Most of the main characters featured in the Pharsalia are terribly flawed and unattractive. Caesar, for instance, is presented as a successful military leader, but he strikes fear into the hearts of people and is extremely destructive. Lucan conveys this by using a simile (Book 1, lines 151–7) that compares Caesar to a thunderbolt:

qualiter expressum uentis per nubila fulmen
aetheris inpulsi sonitu mundique fragore
emicuit rupitque diem populosque pauentes
terruit obliqua praestringens lumina flamma:
in sua templa furit, nullaque exire uetante
materia magnamque cadens magnamque reuertens
dat stragem late sparsosque recolligit ignes.

Translation:

Just so flashes out the thunderbolt shot forth by the winds through clouds,
accompanied by the crashing of the heavens and sound of shattered ether;
it splits the sky and terrifies the panicked
people, searing eyes with slanting flame;
against its own precincts it rages, and, with nothing solid stopping
its course, both as it falls and then returns great is the devastation
dealt far and wide before it gathers again its scattered fires.

— From Susanna Braund's 1992 translation

Throughout the Pharsalia, this simile holds, and Caesar is continuously depicted as an active force, who strikes with great power.

Pompey, on the other hand, is old and past his prime, and years of peacetime have turned him soft. Susanna Braund argues that Lucan "has taken the weaker, essentially human, elements of Aeneas' character—Aeneas doubting his mission, Aeneas as husband and lover—and bestowed them upon Pompey." And while this portrays the leader as indecisive, slow to action, and ultimately ineffective, it does make him the only main character shown to have any sort of "emotional life." What is more, Lucan at times explicitly roots for Pompey. But nevertheless, the leader is doomed in the end. Lucan compares Pompey to a large oak-tree (Book 1, lines 136–43), which is still quite magnificent due to its size but on the verge of tipping over:

qualis frugifero quercus sublimis in agro
exuuias ueteris populi sacrataque gestans
dona ducum nec iam ualidis radicibus haerens
pondere fixa suo est, nudosque per aera ramos
effundens trunco, non frondibus, efficit umbram,
et quamuis primo nutet casura sub Euro,
tot circum siluae firmo se robore tollant,
sola tamen colitur.

Translation:

Like in a fruitful field, a lofty oak,
bearing the people's spoils of old and generals'
hallowed dedications; clinging with roots no longer strong,
by its own weight it stands firm, and spreading naked branches
through the air, it makes shade with trunk, not foliage;
and though it totters, ready to fall beneath the first Eurus,
though all around so many trees upraise themselves with sturdy trunks,
yet it alone is venerated.

— From Susanna Braund's 1992 translation

By comparing Caesar to a bolt of lightning, and Pompey to a large tree on the verge of death, Lucan poetically implies early on in the Pharsalia that Caesar will strike and fell Pompey.

The grand exception to this generally bleak depiction of characters is Cato, who stands as a Stoic ideal in the face of a world gone mad (he alone, for example, refuses to consult oracles to know the future). Pompey also seems transformed after Pharsalus, becoming a kind of stoic martyr; calm in the face of certain death upon arrival in Egypt, he receives virtual canonization from Lucan at the start of book IX. This elevation of Stoic and Republican principles is in sharp contrast to the ambitious and imperial Caesar, who becomes an even greater monster after the decisive battle. Even though Caesar wins in the end, Lucan makes his sentiments known in the famous line Victrix causa deis placuit sed Victa Catoni – "The victorious cause pleased the gods, but the vanquished [cause] pleased Cato."

=== Anti-imperialism ===
Given Lucan's clear anti-imperialism, the flattering Book I dedication to Nero – which includes lines like multum Roma tamen debet ciuilibus armis | quod tibi res acta est – "But Rome is greater by these civil wars, because it resulted in you" – is somewhat puzzling. Some scholars have tried to read these lines ironically, but most see it as a traditional dedication written at a time before the (supposed) true depravity of Lucan's patron was revealed. The extant "Lives" of the poet support this interpretation, stating that a portion of the Pharsalia was in circulation before Lucan and Nero had their falling out.

Furthermore, according to Braund, Lucan's negative portrayal of Caesar in the early portion of the poem was not likely meant as criticism of Nero, and it may have been Lucan's way of warning the new emperor about the issues of the past.

=== Treatment of the supernatural ===
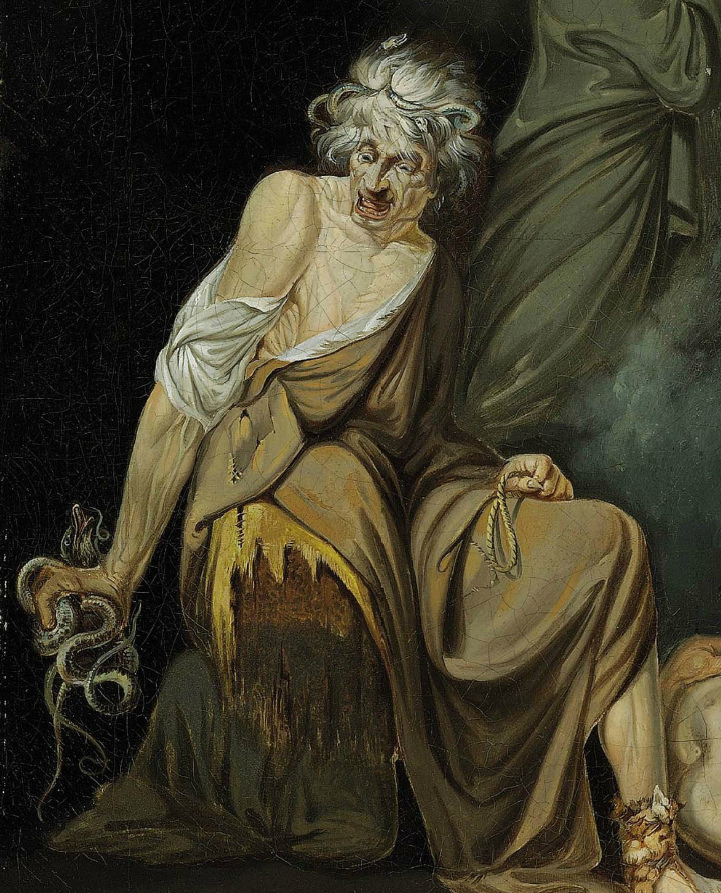
In book six, Erichtho (pictured) performs a necromantic rite, which many contend is one of the Pharsalia's best-known sequences.

Lucan breaks from epic tradition by minimizing, and in certain cases, completely ignoring (and some argue, denying) the existence of the traditional Roman deities. This is in marked contrast to his predecessors, Virgil and Ovid, who used anthropomorphized gods and goddesses as major players in their works. According to Susanna Braund, by choosing to not focus on the gods, Lucan emphasizes and underscores the human role in the atrocities of the Roman civil war. James Duff, on the other hand, argues that "[Lucan] was dealing with Roman history and with fairly recent events; and the introduction of the gods as actors must have been grotesque".

This, however, is not to say that the Pharsalia is devoid of any supernatural phenomenon; in fact, quite the opposite is true, and Braund argues that "the supernatural in all its manifestations played a highly significant part in the structuring of the epic". Braund sees the supernatural as falling into two categories: "dreams and visions" and "portents, prophecies, and consultations of supernatural powers". In regards to the first category, the poem features four explicit and important dream and vision sequences: Caesar's vision of Roma as he is about to cross the Rubicon, the ghost of Julia appearing to Pompey, Pompey's dream of his happy past, and Caesar and his troops' dream of battle and destruction. All four of these dream-visions are placed strategically throughout the poem, "to provide balance and contrast". In regards to the second category, Lucan describes a number of portents, two oracular episodes, and Erichtho's necromantic rite. This manifestation of the supernatural is more public, and serves many purposes, including to reflect "Rome's turmoil on the supernatural plane", as well as simply to "contribute to the atmosphere of sinster foreboding" by describing disturbing rituals.

=== The poem as civil war ===
According to Jamie Masters, Lucan's Pharsalia is not just a poem about a civil war, but rather in a metaphorical way is a civil war. In other words, he argues that Lucan embraces the metaphor of internal discord and allows it to determine the way the story is told by weaving it into the fabric of the poem itself. Masters proposes that Lucan's work is both "Pompeian" (in the sense that it celebrates the memory of Pompey, revels in delay, and decries the horrors of civil war) and "Caesarian" (in the sense that it still recounts Pompey's death, eventually overcomes delay, and describes the horrors of war in careful detail). Because Lucan is on both of the characters' sides whilst also supporting neither, the poem is inherently at war with itself. Furthermore, because Lucan seems to place numerous obstacles before Caesar, he can be seen as opposing Caesar's actions. However, since Lucan still chooses to record them in song, he—being the poet and thus the one who has the final say on what goes into his work—is in some ways waging the war himself. Ultimately, Masters refers to the binary opposition that he sees throughout the entire poem as Lucan's "schizophrenic poetic persona".

=== Poetic representation of history ===
Though the Pharsalia is an historical epic, it would be wrong to think Lucan is only interested in the details of history itself. As one commentator has pointed out, Lucan is more concerned "with the significance of events rather than the events themselves".

=== Barbaric nature of the Celts ===
==== Triad of Gaulish deities ====
..."And those who pacify with blood accursed
Savage Teutates, Esus' horrid shrines,
And Taranis' altars, cruel as were those
Loved by Diana, (Note: Perseus – Pharsalia, book 1, line 447...."This Diana was worshipped by the Tauri, a people who dwelt in the Crimea; and, according to legend, was propitiated by human sacrifices.) goddess of the north;

— Pharsalia, book 1, lines 444–447. (Note: English translation by Sir Edward Ridley, 1905.)

Lucan alludes to the barbaric nature of the Celts, while describing the call-out of troops from Gaul, at the beginning of Caesar's civil war. (Note: ..."When Caesar saw them welcome thus the war And Fortune leading on, and favouring fates, He seized the moment, called his troops from Gaul, And breaking up his camp set on for Rome. – Pharsalia, book 1, lines 392–395.)

..."Et quibus immitis placatur sanguine diro
Teutates, horrensque feris altaribus Hesus,
Et Taranis Scythicae non mitior ara Dianae.
– Lucan, Pharsalia, book 1, lines 444–446. (Note: Carolus Hermannus Weise, 1835.)

The Celts were accused of the propitiation of their gods by acts of human sacrifice:

1. Teutates favoured death by drowning. (Note: MacKillop – Dictionary of Celtic Mythology Teutates ..."As Lucan reports, each divinity was propitiated with human sacrifice; and a 9th-century commentary on Lucan claims that Teutates favoured drowning, especially on 1st November (Samhain) ...)
2. Hesus favoured death by hanging. (Note: MacKillop – Dictionary of Celtic Mythology Esus, Hesus ..."Human sacrifices are suspended from trees and ritually wounded ...)
3. Taranis favoured death by burning. (Note: MacKillop – Dictionary of Celtic Mythology Taranis..."While each of the deities was propitiated with human sacrifice, according to Lucan, the cult of Taranis was crueler than that of the Scythian Diana; victims could be burned alive in wooden vessels ...)

===== List of deities =====
List of deities mentioned in book 1:

Name	Other names	Associations	Etymology
Teutates	Toutatis, Tūtatus.	God of the tribe.	PIE *tewtéh₂ ("tribe"). Proto-Celtic *toutā ("tribe"). Old Irish túath ("tribe").
Hesus	Esus, Æsus, Aisus.	God of the river.	PIE *eis ("energy, passion"). Old Irish ess ("cataract, rapid"); Proto-Celtic *is ("river"). (Note: The upper part of the Thames was previously known as the Isa or Ise.) (Note: The Danube was previously known as the Ister or Istros.)
Taranis	Tanarus, Taramus.	God of thunder. God of the wheel.	Proto-Celtic *toranos ("thunder"). Old Irish torann ("thunder"). Welsh taran; Breton taran. Gaulish taram ("thunder").
Dianae (Note: The Scythian Diana was presumably worshipped in the Scythian kingdom, to the north and west of the Black Sea, including the lower Danube basin.)	Diana, goddess of the north. (Note: The 1905 English translation, by Sir Edward Ridley, considered the Scythian Diana to be the same goddess as the one worshipped by the Celts who lived north of the Alps. The Romans believed those Celts to be uncivilized barbarians.) (Note: Alice Roberts – The Celts......"It's been all too easy to buy that classical propaganda and distinguish between the civilized Mediterranean societies to the south and the barbarians north of the Alps ...)	Mother goddess of the Celts, from whom the river Danube derives its name. (Note: See also: Danube: Names and etymology; Association with deities.)	PIE deywós ("sky god"). Old Irish dé ("god"). Celtic anawes ("wealth, abundance"). Old Irish anai ("wealth, riches").

===== Lucan's sources =====
The source of Lucan's information is not known – Pharsalia was written about 100 years after the Battle of Pharsalus (9 August 48 BC). It is possible that oral traditions about the pagan practices of the Celts were well known in Roman society before Lucan wrote Pharsalia, and that variants arose that were a mix of fact and fiction, designed to entertain and thrill an audience. (Note: Alice Roberts – The Celts......"It's the Roman literature in particular which perhaps gives us the best insight into Celtic beliefs and practices ...telling a good tale about barbarians and their bizarre beliefs might have been more important to the writer than objectivity ...) (Note: Alice Roberts – The Celts......"The Roman accounts of gruesome practices among their barbarian neighbours north of the Alps may well have been deliberate anti-Celtic propaganda...The accounts of human sacrifices, in particular, could be malicious fictions ...)

Some historians consider the possibility that Roman commentators exaggerated the barbaric nature of the Celts, perhaps in order to justify the Roman annexation of their lands, and attempts to subjugate and Romanise them. (Note: Alice Roberts – The Celts......"classical historians may not have been entirely objective when they described the practices of the barbarians living beyond the frontiers of their civilised world. They had a vested interest in portraying the Celts as uncivilised ...)

===== Votive offerings =====
Although it is true that the Celts did practice human sacrifice, it is unlikely that it was as barbaric as Lucan suggested; it is more likely to have taken the form of a votive offering to the Celtic gods – possibly in response to a natural or man-made disaster, such as a famine or war. During the Iron Age, votive offerings became increasingly more precious and labour-intensive, for example the Battersea Shield found at an ancient crossing point of the Thames, (Note: Neil Oliver – Wisdom of the Ancients Battersea Shield..."It shows no signs of having being used in any fight and was, in all likelihood, made only as a votive offering by a warlord intent on giving thanks, or else asking for help...perhaps soon after some or other triumph, or in the face of disaster ...) or the Gundestrup cauldron, found in Denmark.

The druids had extraordinary power and influence, and were able to arrange the most ultimate votive offering – the sacrifice of a person of importance –, for example, a tribal leader. (Note: Alice Roberts – The Celts......"It's a world shrouded in mystery, where watery places held sacred significance – where swords and shields were thrown into rivers, huge cauldrons thrown into lakes, and the bodies of kings, slain as sacrifices, were consigned to bogs ...)

===== Gundestrup cauldron =====
The Gundestrup cauldron, found in Denmark, is an outstanding example of Iron Age art and craftsmanship. Experts consider the possibility that the cauldron was made in the lower Danube basin, due to its Thracian style of metalworking. (Note: Alice Roberts – The Celts... Gundestrup cauldron ..."experts have looked further south for its origin, suggesting the lower Danube Valley, where Celtic and Thracian tribes came into contact ...) (Note: See also: Thracian treasure.)

The internal plates C and E possibly depict the Gaulish deities Taranis and Teutates:

Interior plate A – The horned god Cernunnos is known primarily from Pillar of the Boatmen, which also includes a dedication to the Gaulish deity Esus, god of the river. (Note: Alice Roberts – The Celts......"One of the internal plates of the cauldron shows a god with antlers, perhaps the horned god Cernunnos, or Hern the Hunter. He sits cross-legged, and wears a torc around his neck ...)

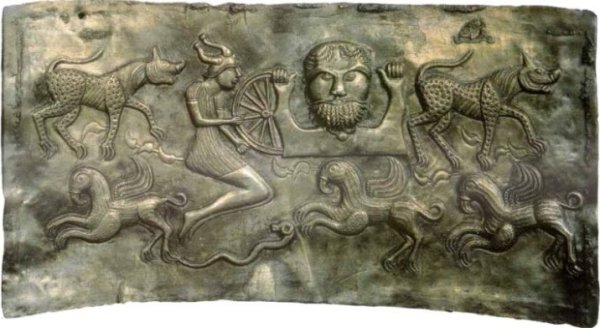
Interior plate C.

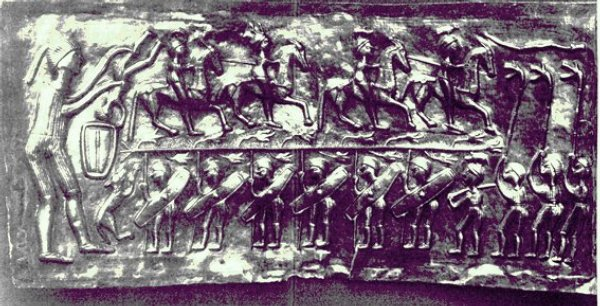
Interior plate E.

Interior plate C – The bust of a bearded man, holding a wheel, is possibly Taranis, god of the wheel. (Note: See also: Gundestrup cauldron: Celtic archaeology ..."The figure holding the broken wheel...thought to be Taranis...) The feminine figure beside him is possibly "Diana, goddess of the north".

..."Et Taranis Scythicae non mitior ara Dianae.
– Lucan, Pharsalia, book 1, line 446.

A more literal translation might be:
..."And Taranis' Scythian non-placid altar Diana.

Interior plate E – It has been conjectured that the giant figure on the left might be the Gaulish deity Teutates. (Note: MacKillop – Dictionary of Celtic Mythology Gundestrup cauldron ..."A tall divine figure holding a man over a vat of water is thought to be Teutates accepting human sacrifice ...) The iconography was possibly influenced by the same sources that Lucan used for Pharsalia.

== Influence ==
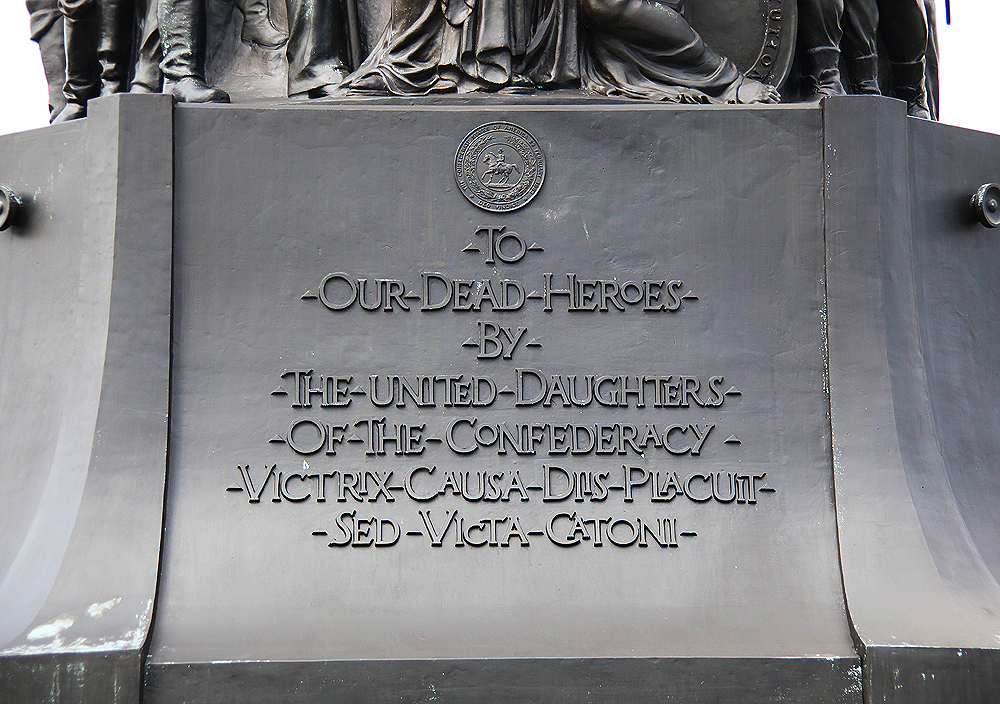
The base of the Confederate Memorial at Arlington National Cemetery in the United States, which is inscribed with Lucan's line, Victrix causa deis placuit sed victa Catoni.

Lucan's work was popular in his own day and remained a school text in late antiquity and during the Middle Ages. Over 400 manuscripts survive; its interest to the court of Charlemagne is evidenced by the existence of five complete manuscripts from the 9th century. Dante includes Lucan among other classical poets in the first circle of the Inferno, and draws on the Pharsalia in the scene with Antaeus (a giant depicted in a story from Lucan's book IV).

Christopher Marlowe published a translation of Book I, while Thomas May followed with a complete translation into heroic couplets in 1626. May later translated the remaining books and wrote a continuation of Lucan's incomplete poem. The seven books of May's effort take the story through to Caesar's assassination.

It probably inspired at least two of the best known lines – "Musick has Charms to soothe a savage Breast, / To soften Rocks, or bend a knotted Oak" – from William Congreve's 1697 play The Mourning Bride.

The line Victrix causa deis placuit sed victa Catoni has been a favorite for supporters of "lost" causes over the centuries; it can be translated as "the winning cause pleased the gods, but the lost cause pleased Cato". One American example comes from the Confederate Memorial at Arlington National Cemetery, which has these words in Latin inscribed on its base. An English example is found in the speech of Viscount Radcliffe in the House of Lords adjudicating on a tax appeal.

The English poet and classicist A. E. Housman published a landmark critical edition of the poem in 1926.

== Bibliography ==
- Bartsch, Shadi (1997). Ideology in Cold Blood: A Reading of Lucan's 'Civil War'. Cambridge, Massachusetts: Harvard University Press. ISBN 0674442911.
- Braund, Susanna, ed. (1992). "Introduction". Lucan: Civil War. Oxford World's Classics. Oxford, UK: Oxford University Press. pp. xiii–l. ISBN 9780191505836.
- Braund, Susanna (2009). A Lucan Reader: Selections from Civil War. Mundelein, IL: Bolchazy-Carducci Publishers.
- Conte, Gian Biagio (2010). "The Poem of the Pharsalia". In Charles Tesoriero (ed.). Lucan. Oxford Readings in Classical Studies. Oxford, UK: Oxford University Press. pp. 46–58. ISBN 9780199277230.
- Davis, Martha (1993). "Jamie Masters, Poetry and civil war in Lucan's Bellum Civile. Cambridge: Cambridge University Press, 1992. Pp. xiv + 271. ISBN 0-521-41460-1". Bryn Mawr Classical Review. 4 (3). Archived from the original on April 11, 2018.
- Duff, J. D., ed. (1928). "Introduction". Lucan: The Civil War. Loeb Classical Library. Vol. 220. Cambridge, MA: Harvard University Press.
- Gill, Roma (1973). "Marlowe, Lucan, and Sulpitius". The Review of English Studies. 24 (96): 401–413. doi:10.1093/res/XXIV.93.401. ISSN 0034-6551. JSTOR 513749. (subscription required)
- Grimal, Pierre (2010). "Is the Eulogy of Nero at the Beginning of the Pharsalia Ironic?". In Charles Tesoriero (ed.). Lucan. Oxford Readings in Classical Studies. Oxford, UK: Oxford University Press. pp. 59–68. ISBN 9780199277230.
- Hardie, Philip (2013). "Lucan's Bellum Civile". In Emma Buckley; Martin Dinter (eds.). Companion to the Neronian Age. Blackwell Companions to the Ancient World. Hoboken, New Jersey: Wiley-Blackwell. pp. 225–240. ISBN 9781118316535.
- Henderson, John (2010). "Lucan/The World at War". In Charles Tesoriero (ed.). Lucan. Oxford Readings in Classical Studies. Oxford, UK: Oxford University Press. pp. 433–492. ISBN 9780199277230.
- Hirst, Gertrude (1927). "Review of M. Annaei Lucani Belli Civilis Libri Decem". The Classical Weekly. 21 (7): 54–56. doi:10.2307/4389046. ISSN 1940-641X. JSTOR 4389046. (subscription required)
- Koch, John T. (2006). Celtic Culture: A Historical Encyclopedia [5 volumes]. ABC-Clio. ISBN 978-1851094400.
- Lapidge, Michael (2010). "Lucan's Imagery of Cosmic Dissolution". In Charles Tesoriero (ed.). Lucan. Oxford Readings in Classical Studies. Oxford, UK: Oxford University Press. pp. 289–323. ISBN 9780199277230.
- Leigh, Matthew (1997). Lucan: Spectacle and Engagement. Oxford, UK: Clarendon Press. ISBN 9780198150671.
- Lintott, A. W. (2010). "Lucan and the History of the Civil War". In Charles Tesoriero (ed.). Lucan. Oxford Readings in Classical Studies. Oxford, UK: Oxford University Press. pp. 239–268. ISBN 9780199277230.
- Lowndes, William Thomas (1834). The Bibliographer's Manual of English Literature. William Pickering.
- Lucan (1928). J. D. Duff (ed.). Lucan: The Civil War. Loeb Classical Library. Vol. 220. Cambridge, MA: Harvard University Press.
- Lucan; May, Thomas (1631). Lucan's Pharsalia: Englished by Thomas May (A Continuation of the Subject of Lucan's Historical Poem, Till the Death of Julius Cæsar). London, UK–79: Peter Parker.
- MacKillop, James (2004). Oxford Dictionary of Celtic Mythology. Oxford University Press. ISBN 978-0198609674.
- Martindale, C. (1976). "Paradox, Hyperbole and Literary Novelty in Lucan's De Bello Civili". Bulletin of the Institute of Classical Studies. 23. University of London: 45–54. doi:10.1111/j.2041-5370.1976.tb00349.x.
- Masters, Jamie (1992). Poetry and Civil War in Lucan's Bellum Civile. Cambridge Classical Studies. Cambridge, UK: Cambridge University Press. ISBN 0521414601.
- Morford, Mark P. O. (1967). The Poet Lucan: Studies in Rhetorical Epic. Oxford, UK: Blackwell.
- Oliver, Neil (2020). Wisdom of the Ancients: Life lessons from our distant past. Bantam Press. ISBN 978-1787633094.
- Roberts, Alice (2015). The Celts: Search for a Civilisation. Heron Books. ISBN 978-1784293321.
- Rosner-Siegel, Judith (2010). "The Oak and the Lightning: Bellum Civile 1.135–157". In Charles Tesoriero (ed.). Lucan. Oxford Readings in Classical Studies. Oxford, UK: Oxford University Press. pp. 184–200. ISBN 9780199277230.
- Smith, Cabell (1920). "Inscriptions on Arlington Confederate Monument". Confederate Veteran. Vol. 20. United Confederate Veterans.
- Watt, Robert (1824). Bibliotheca Britannica. Vol. 2. Edinburgh, Scotland: Archibald Constable and Company.
