= Corynaeus =

Name of one or more characters in Virgil's Aeneid

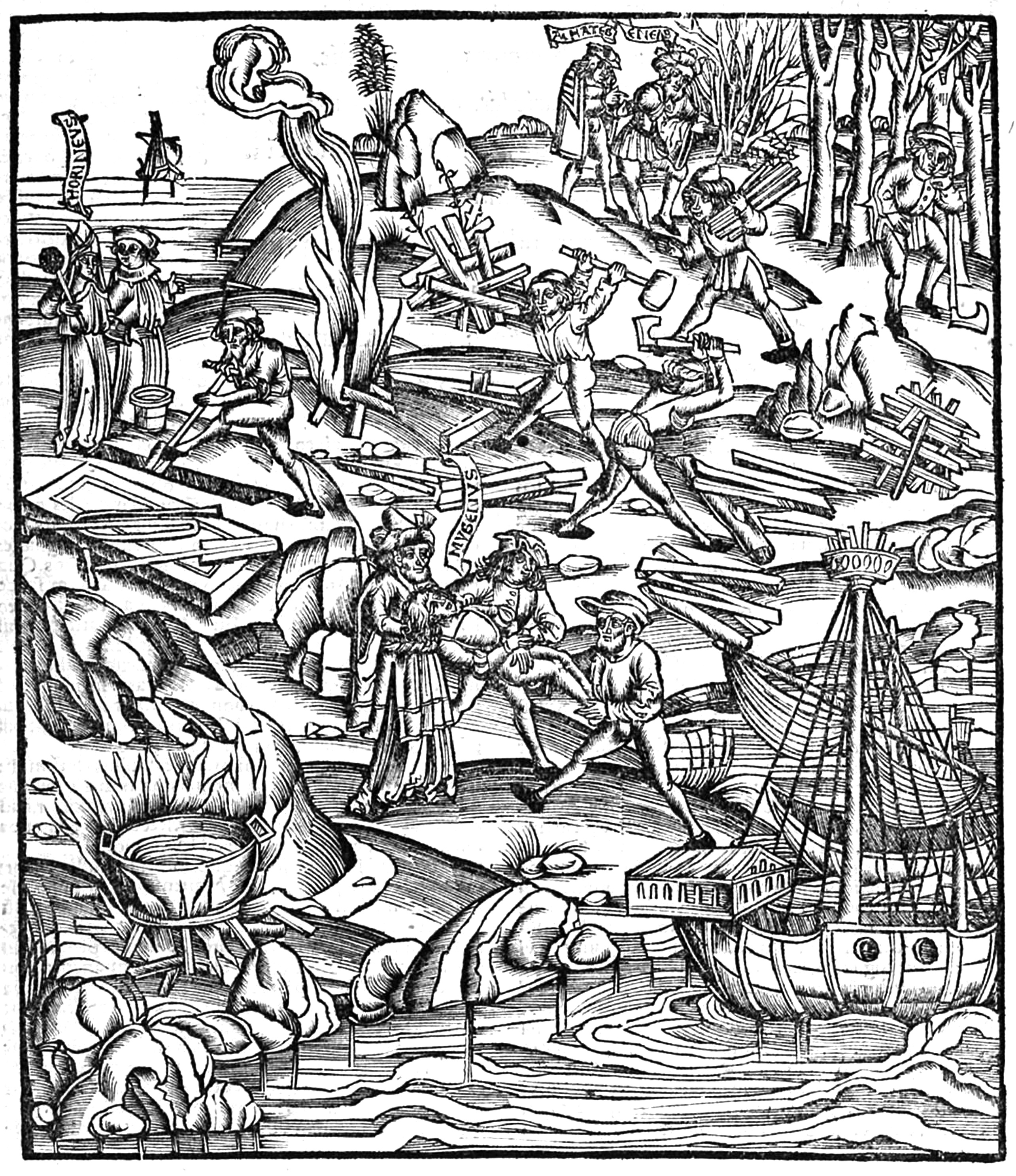
Corynaeus (top left) overseeing the funerary rites of Misenus in a 1502 woodcut

Corynaeus is the name of one or more characters in Virgil's Aeneid (29–19 BCE). The first mention of Corynaeus in the poem is as a follower of Aeneas, who performs funerary rites for Misenus. Characters of the same name are then specified both as being killed by an archer, and later fighting in the final battle. This apparent contradiction is often explained by defining them as two separate characters.

== Narrative ==
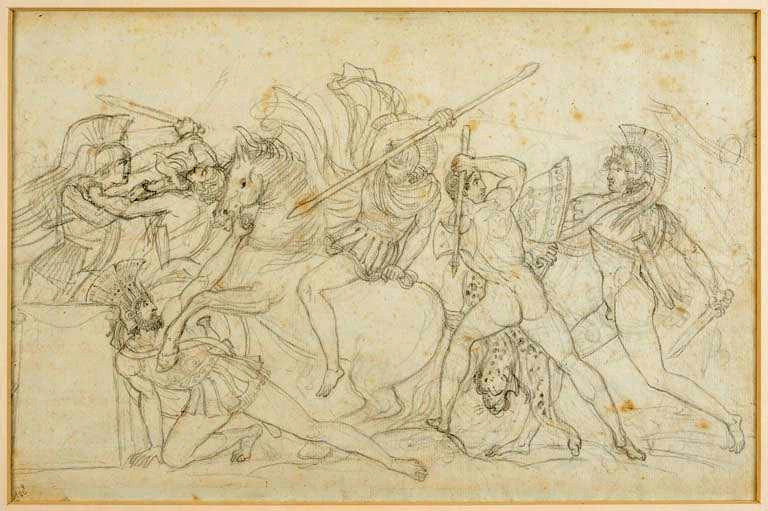
Corynaeus (left) fighting Ebysus in a drawing by Anne-Louis Girodet de Roussy-Trioson

In book six of the Aeneid, Corynaeus is mentioned as performing part of the burial ritual for the musician Misenus that will allow Aeneas to descend into the underworld. Corynaeus then performs the lustration ritual that follows, to purify the Trojans from contact with the dead body, by walking around them three times while sprinkling dew from an olive branch, and saying words of farewell. Christian Gottlob Heyne and John Conington agree that Corynaeus is specified here merely for the sake of specifying a character.

In book nine, Corynaeus is killed by the archer Asilas during Turnus' raid on the Trojan camp. This is during a battle scene, with several alternating Trojan and Latin deaths seemingly designed to indicate that the state of the battle is even at this point.

In book twelve, during the final battle against Turnus at Laurentum, Corynaeus is described as a bold warrior. He takes a burning firebrand from an altar, throws it into the face of the warrior Ebysus, then grabs him and forces him to the ground with one knee before stabbing him in the side. J. G. Cooper suggests that Corynaeus had been offering sacrifices at the altar when the battle began, calling him a Trojan priest, which recalls his role in book six.

== Characters ==
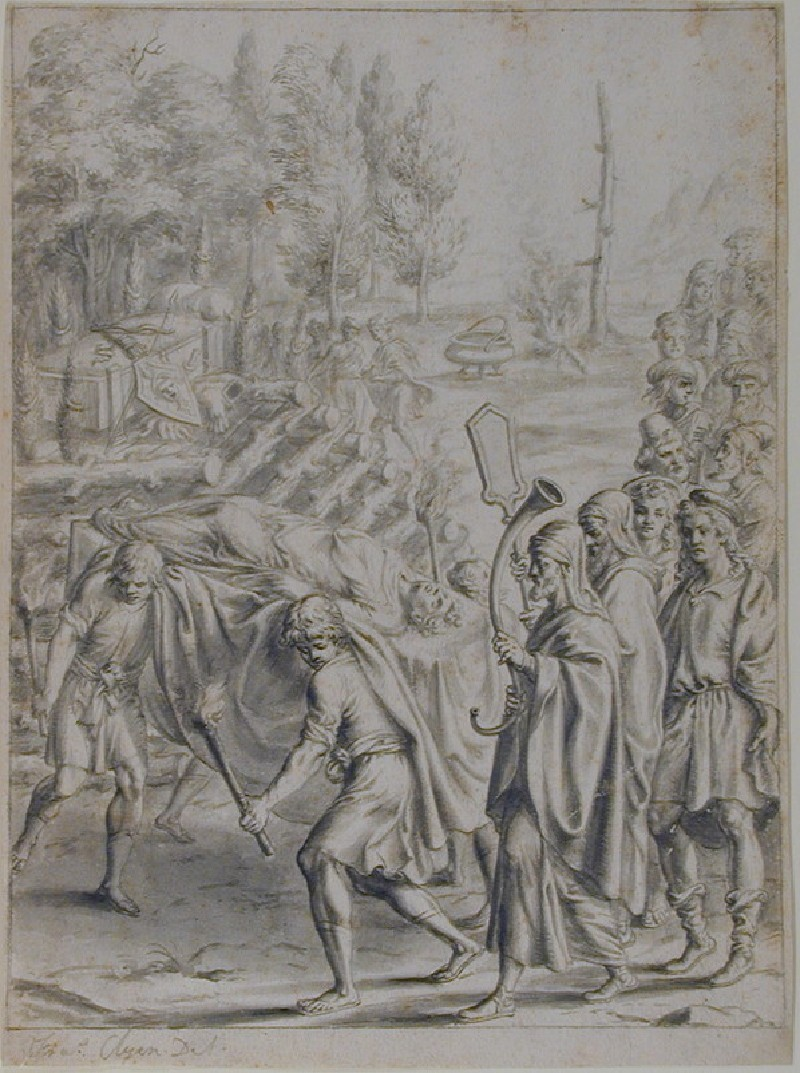
The Funeral of Misenus (c. 1653) by Francis Cleyn

The apparent contradiction—Corynaeus being present at the final battle despite a character of the same name being killed earlier in the story—is part of what academic Ettore Paratore describes as an "incredible confusion" of the text. Macrobius pointed this out in his Saturnalia, saying Virgil "often becomes careless and confused" about his characters, giving Corynaeus as an example. According to tradition Virgil considered the Aeneid a draft that he was in the process of revising at the time of his death, and it is known to contain several similar minor contradictions.

Scholars often explain the apparent contradiction by suggesting that there are two separate characters named Corynaeus. Conington says that both are most likely Trojan companions of Aeneas, and that the first mention in book six may refer to either of the other two. Philologist Hugo Merguet and the Enciclopedia Virgilian agree that all mentions of Corynaeus refer to Trojans, though they also refer to his opponent Asilas as Trojan. Frederick Ahl, Henry Simmons Frieze, and John Bell connect the Corynaeus of books six and twelve, calling the mention in book nine a separate character. Academics Catherine Saunders and Jacob Hammer instead group the first two mentions together, describing the character as a Trojan priest, while calling the character of book twelve a Latin (Saunders) or a Rutulian (Hammer). Gavin Douglas called Corynaeus "a stowt Troiane" in book twelve, while the character in book nine is on the opposing side to Asilas, who he calls a Phrygian. Francis Gouldman defined the Corynaeus of book nine as a Rutulian, and called him a "skilful darter", following Charles Estienne's interpretation that the archer mentioned in book nine referred to Corynaeus, not Asilas. Benjamin Hall Kennedy has both Asilas and Ebysus as Trojans, while listing Corynaeus with the soldiers of Turnus, and only assigning the Corynaeus of book six to the Trojans. Charles Anthon suggests that Ebysus' beard was in the Etrurian fashion, making him one of Mezentius' Etruscan warriors, and as a result says the Corynaeus of book twelve must be a Trojan. Ahl notes that many characters on both sides of the conflict have the same names, which enhances the sense that it is describing a civil war.

== Name ==
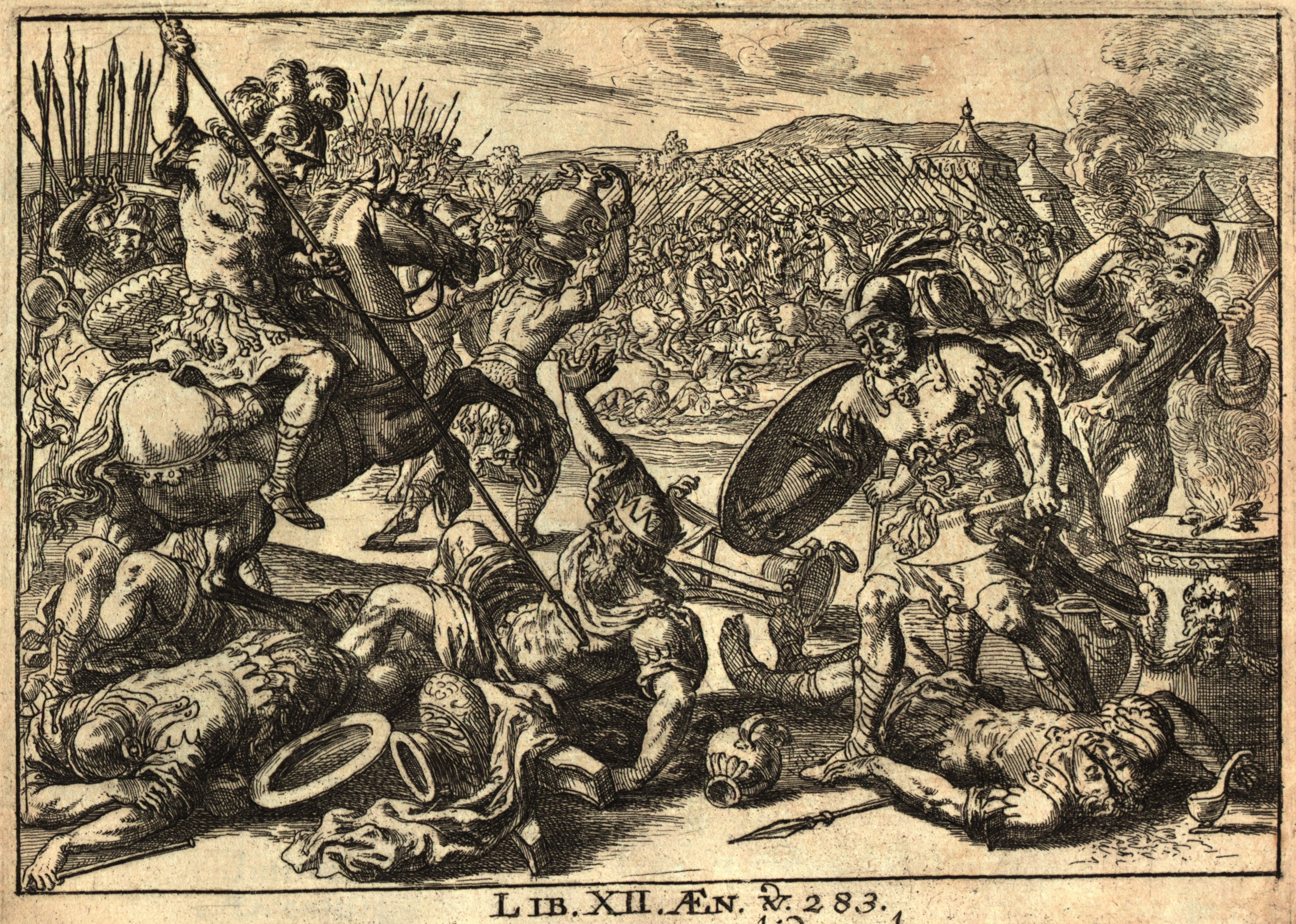
Corynaeus setting Ebysus' beard alight (right) in a 1688 engraving

There are various spellings of the name in the surviving manuscripts of the Aeneid. Christian Gottlob Heyne extrapolated that the Greek form of the name would be Κορυναῖος (Korynaios) from Κορύνη (Korynē) meaning 'club' (often iron shod) or 'mace'. Saunders agreed with this etymology for the name of Corynaeus of book twelve, as suggested by his throwing of a club (the burning firebrand) at Ebysus, but put forward an alternative etymology for the Corynaeus of books six and nine, who she described as one of several Trojan characters who may have their names derived from places: in this instance either the Corynaeum, a peak of Mount Mimas, or the city of Koryne below it.

Early English translations of the Aeneid also vary in their spelling of Corynaeus' name. Gavin Douglas' Eneados (1513) spelled the name "Choryneus" in books six and nine, and "Chorineus" in book twelve. Thomas Twyne's 1584 completion of Thomas Phaer's translation of the Aeneid changed Corynaeus' name to "Sir Chorinee", which academic Steven Lally described as having "a peculiarly English sound, almost a low or clown-like familiarity" in contrast to the epic sounding Latin form of his name. John Dryden's 1697 loose translation calls him "Old Chorineus" in book six, and "Priest Chorinæus" in book twelve, while omitting the name of Asilas' victim in book nine.

== Legacy ==
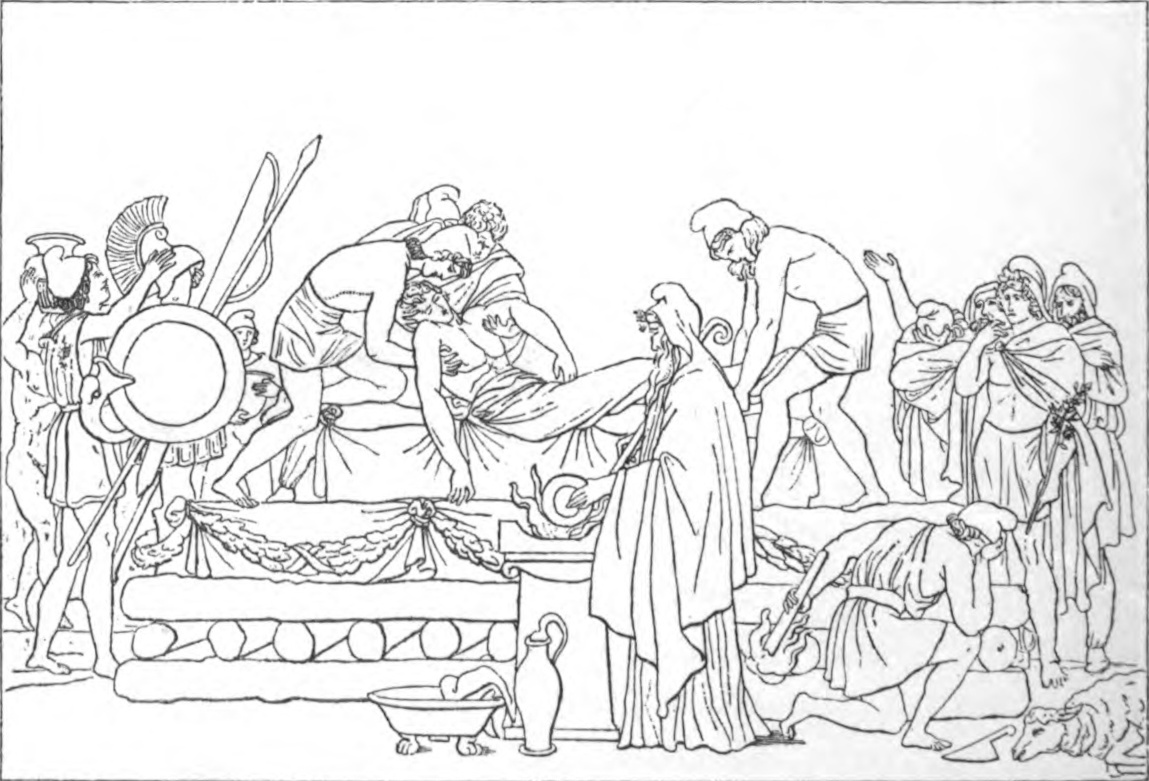
"Funeral Rites of Misenus" illustration from The Wanderings of Æneas and the Founding of Rome (1890)

In Ovid's Metamorphoses (8 CE) Athis is killed by Perseus with a log that had been smoldering in the middle of the altar. Alison Keith suggests that this was modelled on Corynaeus' killing of Ebysus in the Aeneid.

Oxyrhynchus Papyrus 3876 recounts that "Aeolus' cousin tends the corpse, and sets about the pyre". Trying to establish who this refers to, M. W. Haslam suggests that the body could be Misenus (who is referred to as an Aeolian by Virgil) and Aeolus' cousin could be Corynaeus, as the grandfather of Aeolus from the Aeneid was Mimas, who shares a name with Mount Mimas, close to the Corynaeum promontory that may have given Corynaeus his name. However Hugh Lloyd-Jones dismisses this suggestion, remarking that Haslam is "catching at a straw".

The name Corynaeus probably served as the inspiration for Geoffrey of Monmouth's character Corineus, a descendant of the Trojans, and the eponymous founder of Cornwall in the Historia Regum Britanniae (c. 1136). This Corineus is mentioned in Gottfried von Strassburg's Tristan (c. 1210) when referring to a cave from "before Corynaeus' day" shared by the lovers Tristan and Iseult; John Anson suggests that von Strassburg's use of Virgil's spelling Corynaeus here is deliberately deployed with the intention of recalling the Aeneid's Dido and Aeneas.

William Shakespeare's The Comedy of Errors (c. 1589–1595) contains a line describing a doctor "Whose beard they have singed off with brands of fire" (Act 5, Scene 1). Charles Knight suggested that this was based on Corynaeus' setting fire to Ebysus' beard in the Aeneid. Charlotte Porter and Helen A. Clarke support this theory, and say that Shakespeare may have taken it from Twyne's translation.

Corynaeus' lustration ritual in book six may have inspired similar rituals in John Fletcher's The Faithful Shepherdess (1609), and John Milton's Comus (1634).
