= Athis (mythology) =

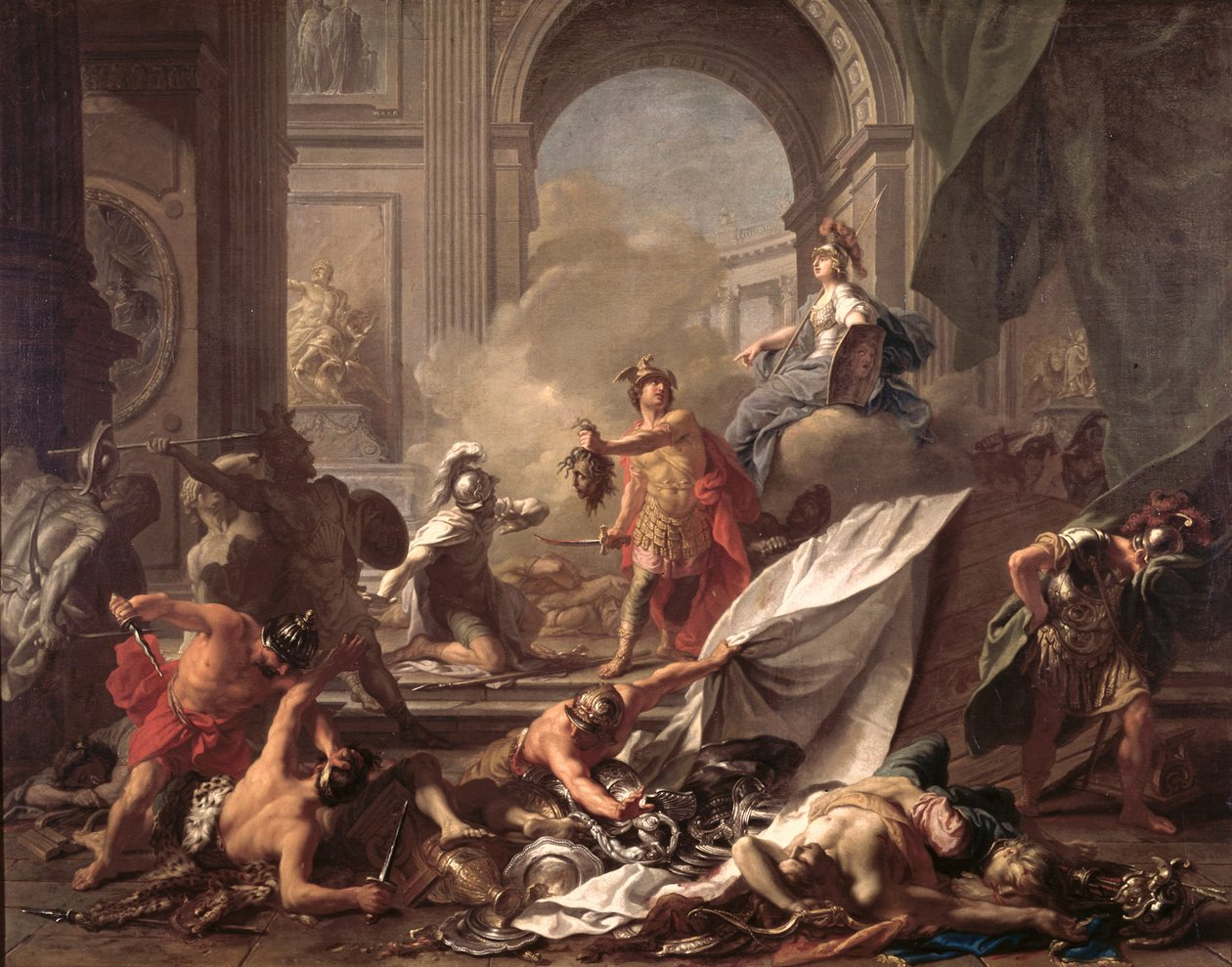
Jean-Marc Nattier, Perseus petrifying Phineus

In Book V of Ovid's mock-epic Metamorphoses, Athis (Ancient Greek: Ἄθις) is a young demigod of outstanding beauty from India, son of Limnaee, a nymph of the Ganges.

== Mythology ==
A very courageous boy and highly skilled archer, Athis was a follower of Phineus. During a quarrel between Perseus and Phineus, the Greek hero killed Athis, who was preparing to shoot his bow, with a log that had been smoldering in the middle of the altar. The Assyrian Lycabas, who Ovid says is Athis' closest friend or, most probably, his lover, wept for his fallen companion, and attempted to avenge him, shooting an arrow at Perseus from Athis's bow. However, Perseus avoided the arrow, and Lycabas, too, fell.

== Inspiration ==
Classical scholar Alison Keith suggests that Athis' death was modelled on Corynaeus' killing of Ebysus after throwing a burning firebrand at him taken from an altar, in Vergil's Aeneid.

== See also ==
- Boast of Cassiopeia
