= Habreas =

Habreas (Ancient Greek: Ἁβρέας or Abreas was a Macedonian soldier of the rank of dimoirites ("half-file leader", a soldier entitled to double pay). In the siege of the city of the Malli in 325 BC, he, Peucestas and Leonnatus were the only ones who could follow Alexander the Great as he jumped into the city from the walls during a sally, just before the ladders of the attackers collapsed, making it impossible for others to follow. The four fought fiercely against the Indians and Habreas was hit by an arrow in the face while defending his king and died. Alexander was also severely wounded in the chest, air mixed with blood coming out from the wound, fought for a short time, then collapsed and nearly died, had not Peucestas stood over him, defending his body with the sacred Trojan shield. Both Peucestas and Leonnatus were wounded before relief came from outside, as the frantic soldiers desperately tried in any way to enter the city and join their king. Arrian describes their efforts to scale the walls with the use of stakes or by climbing on one another. In the end the city was taken and Alexander was saved.
