= Misenus =

Figure from Greco-Roman mythology

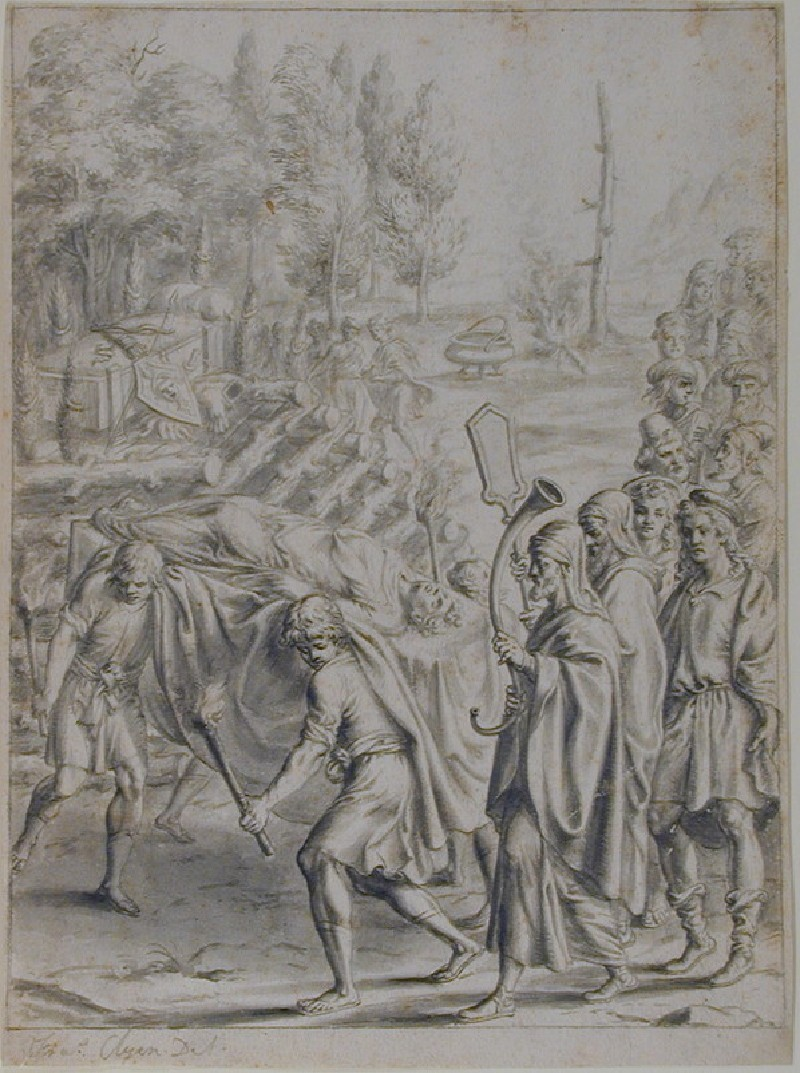
The Funeral of Misenus (c. 1653) by Francis Cleyn

In Greek and Roman mythology, Misenus (Μισηνός) was a name attributed to two individuals.

- Misenus was a friend of Odysseus.
- Misenus was a character in Virgil's epic poem the Aeneid. He was a brother-in-arms of Hector and, after Hector's death, Aeneas' trumpeter. In Book VI, it is revealed that he had challenged the gods to a musical contest on the conch shell, and for his impudence was drowned by Triton. Aeneas was told by the Cumaean Sibyl at that time that Misenus's body had to be buried before he could enter the Underworld. The passage detailing the funeral rites, performed by the Trojan priest Corynaeus, gives an insight into Roman burial customs and the importance the Romans placed on respect for the dead. It is regarded as the passage of the Aeneid most imitative of the Annales of Ennius. Cape Misenum, near Cumae, is supposedly named for Misenus, as noted in Virgil's Aeneid. His being called Aeolides arose from the legendary connection between the Aeolian and Campanian Cumae.

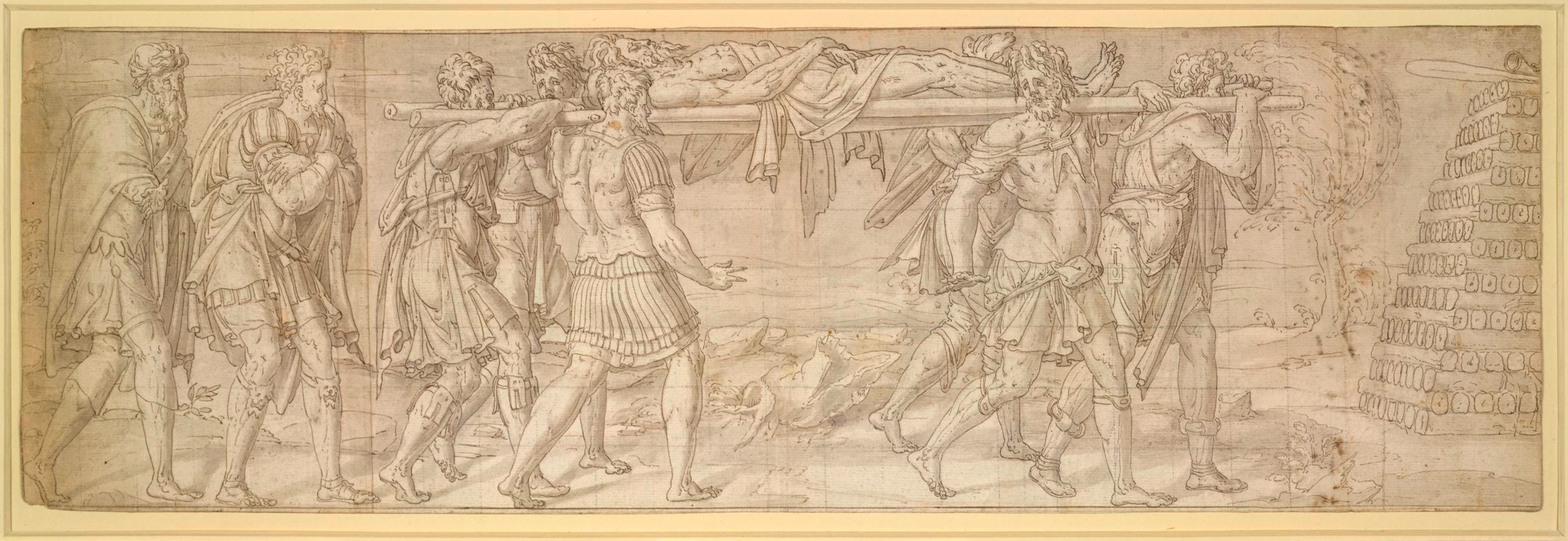
c. 1540 drawing of the funeral of Misenus by Luca Penni
