= Limnaee =

In Greek mythology, Limnaee (Ancient Greek: Λιμναίη, romanized: Limnaiē or Limnaiê, lit. 'of the lake' or 'of the marsh') was a naiad nymph of an Indian lake and a daughter of the river god Ganges in India. She bore Athis, an Indian youth who was slain by Perseus during a battle in the court of King Cepheus of Aethiopia.
