= Charles J. Goodwin Award of Merit =

The Charles J. Goodwin Award of Merit is an annual prize for outstanding publications in the field of classics given by the Society for Classical Studies (SCS).

The Goodwin Award is named in honor of Charles Jaques Goodwin (1866–1935), a long-time member and benefactor of the SCS (then the American Philological Association). Award recipients are chosen by a five-member elected committee and presented at the Society's annual meeting. Prior to the creation of the Raffaella Cribiore Award in 2025, they were the only prizes for books given by the Society.

Works eligible for the award must be published by a member of the Society during the preceding three years. From 1951 until 2013, the award had a single recipient; since then, the SCS Board of Directors mandated the Committee make three awards each year. The Goodwin Award is considered among the most prestigious accolades in classical studies and has had only one repeat winner, Peter T. Struck. Its inaugural recipient was David Magie of Princeton University in 1951.

== List of Goodwin Award winners ==
=== 1951–2012 ===
Year	Author	Title
1951	David Magie	Roman Rule in Asia Minor
1952	Cedric Whitman	Sophocles, A Study of Heroic Humanism
1953	Thomas Robert Shannon Broughton	The Magistrates of the Roman Republic
1954	Benjamin Dean Meritt; Henry Theodore Wade-Gery; Malcolm McGregor	The Athenian Tribute Lists
1955	Ben Edwin Perry	Aesopica
1956	Kurt von Fritz	The Theory of the Mixed Constitution in Antiquity
1957	Jakob Aall Ottesen Larsen	Representative Government in Greek and Roman History
1958	Berthold Louis Ullman	Studies in the Italian Renaissance
1959	Gordon Macdonald Kirkwood	A Study of Sophoclean Drama
1960	Alexander Turyn	The Byzantine Manuscript Tradition of the Tragedies of Euripides
1961	James Wilson Poultney	The Bronze Tables of Iguvium
1962	Lily Ross Taylor	The Voting Districts of the Roman Republic
1963	Gilbert Highet	The Anatomy of Satire
1964	Louise Adams Holland	Janus and the Bridge
1965	Herbert Strainge Long	Diogenis Laertii Vitae Philosophorum
1966	Brooks Otis	Vergil: A Study in Civilized Poetry
1967	George Max Antony Grube	The Greek and Roman Critics
1968	Edward Togo Salmon	Samnium and the Samnites
1969	Helen Florence North	Sophrosyne: Self-Knowledge and Self-Restraint in Greek Literature
1970	Agnes Kirsopp Lake Michels	The Calendar of the Roman Republic
1971	Michael Courtney Jenkins Putnam	Vergil’s Pastoral Art
1972	Friedrich Solmsen	Hesiodi Theogonia Opera et Dies Scutum
1973	Frank M. Snowden, Jr.	Blacks in Antiquity
1974	Charles Edson	Inscriptiones Graecae, Vol. X, Pars II, Facs. I (Inscriptiones Thessalonicae et Viciniae)
1975	George A. Kennedy	The Art of Rhetoric in the Roman World
1976	William K. Pritchett	The Greek State at War
1977	Harold Cherniss	Plutarch’s Moralia XIII, Parts I & II (Loeb)
1978	D. R. Shackleton Bailey	Cicero’s Epistulae ad Familiares, Vols. I–II
1979	Leendert G. Westerink	Greek Commentaries on Plato’s Phaedo, 2 vols.
1980	Emily Vermeule	Aspects of Death in Early Greek Art and Poetry
1981	John H. Finley	Homer’s Odyssey
1982	Gregory Nagy	Best of the Achaeans
1983	Bruce W. Frier	Landlords and Tenants in Imperial Rome
1984	Timothy D. Barnes	Constantine and Eusebius / The New Empire of Diocletian and Constantine
1985	Howard Jacobson	The Exagoge of Ezekiel
1986	William C. Scott	Musical Design in Aeschylean Theater
1987	R. J. A. Talbert	The Senate of Imperial Rome
1988	John J. Winkler	Auctor & Actor: A Narratological Reading of Apuleius’ The Golden Ass
1989	Josiah Ober	Mass and Elite in Democratic Athens: Rhetoric, Ideology and the Power of the People
1990	Martin Ostwald	From Popular Sovereignty to Sovereignty of Law: Law, Society, and Politics in Fifth-Century Athens
1991	Robert A. Kaster	Guardians of Language: The Grammarian and Society in Late Antiquity
1992	Heinrich von Staden	Herophilus: The Art of Medicine in Early Alexandria
1993	Susan Treggiari	Roman Marriage: Iusti Coniuges From the Time of Cicero to the Time of Ulpian
1994	Gregory Vlastos	Socrates: Ironist and Moral Philosopher
1995	Peter White	Promised Verse: Poets in the Society of Augustan Rome
1996	Alan Cameron	The Greek Anthology from Meleager to Planudes
1997	Donald J. Mastronarde	Euripides: Phoenissae
1998	Calvert Watkins	How to Kill a Dragon: Aspects of Indo-European Poetics
1999	Jonathan M. Hall	Ethnic Identity in Greek Antiquity
2000	Kathryn Gutzwiller	Poetic Garlands; Hellenistic Epigrams in Context
2001	Jeffrey Henderson	Aristophanes, Volumes 1-2 (Loeb)
2001	Richard Janko	Philodemus’ On Poems
2002	Kathleen McCarthy	Slaves, Masters, and the Art of Authority in Plautine Comedy
2003	Clifford Ando	Imperial Ideology and Provincial Loyalty in the Roman Empire
2004	Raffaella Cribiore	Gymnastics of the Mind
2005	Timothy Peter Wiseman	The Myths of Rome
2006	Kristina Milnor	Gender, Domesticity, and the Age of Augustus: Inventing Private Life
2007	Peter Struck	Birth of the Symbol: Ancient Readers at the Limits of their Texts
2008	David Konstan	The Emotions of the Ancient Greeks: Studies in Aristotle and Classical Literature
2009	Julia Haig Gaisser	The Fortunes of Apuleius and the Golden Ass
2010	John F. Miller	Apollo, Augustus, and the Poets
2011	Lawrence Kim	Homer between History and Fiction in Imperial Greek Literature
2012	Leslie Kurke	Aesopic Conversations

=== 2013–Present ===
Year	Author	Title
2013	Susanna Elm	Sons of Hellenism, Fathers of the Church
2013	Richard J. Tarrant	Virgil: Aeneid Book XII
2013	Gareth Williams	The Cosmic Viewpoint: A Study of Seneca’s Natural Questions
2014	Robert L. Fowler	Early Greek Mythography. Vol. 2: Commentary
2014	Edith Hall	Adventures with Iphigenia in Tauris: A Cultural History of Euripides’ Black Sea Tragedy
2014	Tim Whitmarsh	Beyond the Second Sophistic: Adventures in Greek Postclassicism
2015	Joshua Billings	Genealogy of the Tragic: Greek Tragedy and German Philosophy
2015	Jackie Elliott	Ennius and the Architecture of the Annales
2015	Emily Mackil	Creating a Common Polity: Religion, Economy, and Politics in the Making of the Greek Koinon
2016	Shadi Bartsch	Persius: A Study in Food, Philosophy, and the Figural
2016	Anthony Corbeill	Sexing the World: Grammatical Gender and Biological Sex in Ancient Rome
2016	Eleanor Dickey	The Colloquia of the Hermeneumata Pseudodositheana
2017	James I. Porter	The Sublime in Antiquity
2017	Amy Russell	The Politics of Public Space in Republican Rome
2017	Peter T. Struck	Divination and Human Nature: A Cognitive History of Intuition in Classical Antiquity
2018	Gil H. Renberg	Where Dreams May Come: Incubation Sanctuaries in the Greco-Roman World
2018	Amy Richlin	Slave Theater in the Roman Republic: Plautus and Popular Comedy
2018	Harriet I. Flower	The Dancing Lares and the Serpent in the Garden: Religion at the Roman Street Corner
2019	Andrew C. Johnston	The Sons of Remus: Identity in Roman Gaul and Spain
2019	Josephine Quinn	In Search of the Phoenicians
2019	Francesca Schironi	The Best of the Grammarians: Aristarchus of Samothrace on the Iliad
2020	Paul J. Kosmin	Time and its Adversaries in the Seleucid Empire
2020	Kelly Shannon-Henderson	Religion and Memory in Tacitus’ Annals
2020	Steven D. Smith	Greek Epigram and Byzantine Culture: Gender, Desire, and Denial in the Age of Justinian
2021	Aileen R. Das	Galen and the Arabic Reception of Plato’s Timaeus
2021	Ellen Oliensis	Loving Writing / Ovid’s Amores
2021	Andreas Willi	Origins of the Greek Verb
2022	Deborah Tarn Steiner	Choral Constructions in Greek Culture: The Idea of the Chorus in the Poetry, Art and Social Practices of the Archaic and Early Classical Period
2022	James Uden	Spectres of Antiquity: Classical Literature and the Gothic, 1740-1830
2022	Katharina Volk	The Roman Republic of Letters: Scholarship, Philosophy, and Politics in the Age of Cicero and Caesar
2023	Claire Bubb	Dissection in Classical Antiquity: A Social and Medical History
2023	Christopher A. Faraone & Sofía Torallas Tovar	The Greco-Egyptian Magical Formularies: Libraries, Books, and Individual Recipes
2023	N. Bryant Kirkland	Herodotus and Imperial Greek Literature: Criticism, Imitation, Reception
2024	Kassandra J. Miller	Time and Ancient Medicine. How Sundials and Water Clocks Changed Medical Science
2024	Colin Webster	Tools and the Organism: Technology and the Body in Ancient Greek and Roman Medicine
2024	Naomi Weiss	Seeing Theater: The Phenomenology of Classical Greek Drama
2025	James Ker	The Ordered Day: Quotidian Time and Forms of Life in Ancient Rome
2025	Andrew Laird	Aztec Latin: Renaissance Learning and Nahuatl Traditions in Early Colonial Mexico
2025	Julia Mebane	The Body Politic in Roman Political Thought
2026	Kim Bowes	Surviving Rome: The Economic Lives of the Ninety Percent
2026	Zachary Herz	The God and the Bureaucrat: Roman Law, Imperial Sovereignty, and Other Stories
2026	Victoria Wohl	The Poetry of Being and the Prose of the World in Early Greek Philosophy

== See also ==
- AJP Best Article Prize, American Journal of Philology
- Kenyon Medal, British Academy
- Runciman Award, Anglo-Hellenic League
- Sather Professorship of Classical Literature, University of California, Berkeley
