= Intercollegiate Center for Classical Studies =

Coordinates: 41°53′7″N 12°27′28″E

Intercollegiate Center for Classical Studies in Rome
- Rome; Italy

Information
- Type: Study abroad center
- Motto: In centro crescit scientia
- Established: 1965
- Faculty: 6
- Enrollment: 35
- Campus type: urban
- Website: thecentrorome.org

The Intercollegiate Center for Classical Studies in Rome (ICCS) is an overseas study center located in Rome, Italy for undergraduate students in fields related to Classical Studies. It was first established in 1965 by ten American colleges and universities; by 2007 the number of member institutions had grown to 113. It is sometimes called the Centro, the Italian word for center.

== Structure ==
Each member institution furnishes a "faculty representative" to the Centro; from these, four are elected by the institutional representatives to sit on a governing board called the Managing Committee, with a fifth member provided by Duke University, which provides administrative services to the ICCS. The Managing Committee elects its chair for a five-year term; the current chair is Professor Jeremy Hartnett of Wabash College. Until 1992, administrative services were provided by Stanford University. The Managing Committee hires a Professor in Charge (PIC) for each year, and three subordinate faculty members, who are responsible for instruction and are usually drawn from American colleges and universities. The Centro offers competitive admission to North American undergraduate students to study the Ancient City, Greek or Latin literature, Italian language, or (Renaissance and Baroque) Art History. A group of normally 36 undergraduate students are competitively selected as Centristi each semester.

The Centro has received financial support from the Andrew W. Mellon Foundation, the Samuel H. Kress Foundation, the Corning Incorporated Foundation, the Danforth Foundation, the Old Dominion Foundation, the David and Lucille Packard Foundation, its consortium of colleges and universities, former students, and friends. One of its founders was the American Classicist Brooks Otis, in whose memory the center's library is named.

== Faculty ==
Normally there are four faculty members at ICCS Rome: a senior 'Professor in Charge' (PIC), two junior professors (often an associate professor and an assistant professor), and a graduate student assistant, the 'Resident Instructor' (RI). The Professor in Charge is chosen by the Managing Committee and the remaining faculty are hired competitively at the annual meetings of the Archaeological Institute of America and the Society for Classical Studies in January. Faculty duties vary in accordance with the organizational plans of the PIC, but the course load is nominally two courses per semester except for the RI, who teaches a 1-1 load with additional resident supervisorial duties. The professors live in ICCS-rented apartments in the neighborhood, while the RI lives on the premises of the ICCS.

=== Professors-in-Charge ===
Year	Name	Institution
1967-1968	William Anderson	University of California, Berkeley
1968-1969	Charles Theophilus Murphy†	Oberlin College
1969-1970	Edward Togo Salmon†	McMaster University
1970-1971	Edward Togo Salmon†	McMaster University
1971-1972	Charles P. Segal	Brown University
1972-1973	John Van Sickle	Brown University
1973-1974	Paul MacKendrick†	University of Wisconsin
1974 Fall	Charles L. Babcock†	Ohio State University
1975 Spring	Alexander McKay†	McMaster University
1975-1976	J. Arthur Hanson†	Princeton University
1976 fall	John E. Stambaugh†	Williams College
1977 spring	Jane Cody	University of Southern California
1977-1978	Katherine A. Geffcken	Wellesley College
1978-1979	Harry B. Evans	Fordham University
1979-1980	Mary Sturgeon	The University of North Carolina at Chapel Hill
1980-1981	Gerhard M. Koeppel†	The University of North Carolina at Chapel Hill
1981-1982	Jean D'Amato	University of Southern California
1982-1983	Eric Nielsen	Bowdoin College
1983-1984	Leon Fitts	Dickinson College
1984-1985	Herbert W. Benario	Emory University
1985-1986	Paul B. Harvey, jr.†	Penn State University
1986-1987	John E. Fischer	Wabash College
1987-1988	Ann Ellis Hanson	Yale University
1988-1989	Stephen L. Dyson	Wesleyan University
1989-1990	Gerhard M. Koeppel†	The University of North Carolina at Chapel Hill
1990-1991	James Russell	University of British Columbia
1991-1992	Russell T. "Darby" Scott	Bryn Mawr College
1992-1993	Mary T. Boatwright	Duke University
1993-1994	James C. Anderson jr.	The University of Georgia
1994-1995	James Franklin	Indiana University, Bloomington
1995-1996	Stephen L. Dyson	University at Buffalo - SUNY
1996-1997	Thomas A.J. McGinn	Vanderbilt University
1997 Fall	James Franklin	Indiana University, Bloomington
1998 Spring	Gerhard M. Koeppel†	University of North Carolina at Chapel Hill
1998-1999	Helen Nagy	University of Puget Sound
1999-2000	James Russell	University of British Columbia
2000-2001	Harry B. Evans	Fordham University
2001-2002	Bernard Frischer	UCLA
2002-2003	Christopher Parslow	Wesleyan University
2003-2004	Michele R. Salzman	University of California, Riverside
2004-2005	Mary Sturgeon	University of North Carolina at Chapel Hill
2005-2006	Michael Maas	Rice University
2006-2007	Douglas Domingo-Forasté	California State University, Long Beach
2007-2008	Walter Englert	Reed College
2008-2009	Nigel Pollard	Swansea University
2009-2010	Peter Burian	Duke University
2010-2011	R. Scott Smith	University of New Hampshire
2011-2012	Gregory S. Bucher	Creighton University
2012-2013	Daniel W. Berman	Temple University
2013-2014	Peter Burian	Duke University
2014-2015	Beth Severy-Hoven	Macalester College
2015-2016	Garrett G. Fagan†	Pennsylvania State University
2016-2017	Christopher A. Gregg	George Mason University
2017-2018	Jeremy Hartnett	Wabash College
2018-2019	Barbette Spaeth	College of William & Mary
2019-2020	John Muccigrosso	Drew University
2020-2021	Myles McDonnell	Queens College, CUNY
2021-2022	Kathleen M. Coleman FBA	Harvard University
2022-2023	Christopher A. Gregg	George Mason University
2023-2024	Anthony Corbeill	University of Virginia
2024-2025	Sonia Sabnis	Reed College
2025-2026	Andrew Goldman	Gonzaga University
2026-2027	Bert Lott	University of Notre Dame
2027-2028	Amy Russell	Brown University

== Coursework ==
The main component of the curriculum at the ICCS is the so-called "Ancient City" course. Worth two credits and demanding an exceptional amount of time, this course teaches the history and archaeology of the city of Rome with a focus on its topography, ancient and modern. Although they are supplemented by a weekly lecture, field trips provide the core of the class, with two excursions per week, one a full day, and one a half day. While pedagogies vary with each PIC, students are generally expected to give one or more on-site presentations, which help further emphasize the physicality of the field.

In addition to the ancient city course students must take two additional courses (some choose to take a third). There is no language requirement, though many students take either Greek and/or Latin at intermediate or advanced levels. Currently Centro provides three electives, Elementary Italian, Renaissance and Baroque Italian art history and a course in Conservation Management. Paul Tegmeyer, a faculty member of John Cabot University, teaches the art history course. The class consists of a weekly lecture Wednesday afternoons and a field trip Friday mornings, normally to a museum or church. Instruction in Italian is provided by Dr. Barbara Castaldo.

== Life at the Centro ==
All students live in a small four-story building that previously served as a convent, located at Via Alessandro Algardi 19, in the Monteverde Vecchio section of Rome, having moved here from Via Ulisse Seni 2. Breakfast, dinner, and most lunches are eaten together on all weekdays; the bedrooms are small; the long and frequent field trips for the Ancient City course mean that class time is heavily weighted.

== Suzanne Deal Booth Scholar-in-Residence ==
In 2012 a program of resident scholars was announced, funded by Suzanne Deal Booth. Booth Residents spend one week at the Centro during each academic year.

Date of Tenure	Name	Institution
2012-13	Richard Talbert	University of North Carolina
2013-14	Susan Stevens	Randolph College
2014-15	Erich Gruen	University of California, Berkeley
2015-16	Anthony Corbeill	University of Kansas
2016-17	Jennifer Trimble	Stanford University
2017-18	Judy Hallett	University of Maryland

== Sources ==
- Mary Taliaferro Boatwright, Michael Maas, Corb Smith, et al. 2015. The Centro at Fifty: The History of the Intercollegiate Center for Classical Studies, 1965-2015. Centro Press. ISBN 9780692378953.
