= Christopher A. Faraone =

American classisist (b. 1955)

- Born: 1955 (age 70–71)
- Occupation: Classicist
- Title: Edward Olson Distinguished Service Professor
- Awards: John Simon Guggenheim Memorial Foundation, National Endowment for the Humanities

Academic background
- Education: Stanford University
- Thesis: Talismans, voodoo dolls and other apotropaic images in ancient Greek myth and ritual (1988)
- Doctoral advisor: John J. Winkler

Academic work
- Discipline: Classics
- Institutions: University of Chicago
- Main interests: Ancient Greek poetry, religion and magic
- Notable works: Faraone, Christopher A. (30 October 2001). Ancient Greek Love Magic. Harvard University Press. ISBN 9780674006966.

Christopher A. Faraone (born 1955) is an American classicist. He is the Edward Olson Distinguished Service Professor in the Department of Classics and the College at the University of Chicago. His work largely covers the study of Ancient Greek poetry, religion and magic, from sources such as text, myths, rituals, and hymns, and from objects such as pottery, papyrus, inscriptions on gems, curse tablets, and figurines or effigies. Faraone is considered to be a foremost scholar on ancient Mediterranean magic.

== Early life ==
Christopher A. Faraone received his Ph.D. at Stanford University in 1988, and wrote his dissertation, "Talismans, voodoo dolls and other apotropaic images in ancient Greek myth and ritual", on apotropaic images in Greek myth and ritual under the direction of John J. Winkler.

== Professor ==
Since the 2021-2022 school year, Faraone has been the Edward Olson Distinguished Service Professor in the Department of Classics and the College at the University of Chicago. He has previously been the Frank Curtis Springer and Gertrude Melcher Springer Professor in the Humanities and the College, and has taught at the University of Chicago since 1991. His research focuses on Ancient Greek poetry, religion and magic. His work also encompasses studying the materials used in Ancient Greek magic and Ancient Greek magic formulas, as well as the effects of different cultures and of gender on the use and applications of Ancient Greek magic. Additionally, Faraone founded the University of Chicago's Center for the Study of Ancient Religions, which he directed for 10 years from 2008-2018. He has lectured at other universities as well, including the University of Toronto, the University of Texas at San Antonio, and Tulane University.

== Major awards ==
- 1995 John Simon Guggenheim Memorial Foundation
- 2013 Fellow at Institut d'Etudes Avancées in Paris
- 2013 National Endowment for the Humanities fellowship
- 2021 Fellowship at School of Historical Studies in Institute for Advanced Study in Princeton, New Jersey
- 2024 Charles J. Goodwin Award of Merit by the Society for Classical Studies

== Publications ==
=== Books ===
- Faraone, Christopher A. (1992). Talismans and Trojan horses: guardian statues in ancient Greek myth and ritual. New York: Oxford University Press. ISBN 0195064046.
- Carpenter, Thomas H.; Faraone, Christopher A., eds. (1993). Masks of Dionysius. Ithaca (N.Y.): Cornell university press. ISBN 0801427797.
- Faraone, Christopher A. (30 October 2001). Ancient Greek Love Magic. Harvard University Press. ISBN 9780674006966.
- Faraone, Christopher A.; McClure, Laura K., eds. (January 2006). Prostitutes and Courtesans in the Ancient World. University of Wisconsin Press. ISBN 978-0-299-21314-5.
- Faraone, Christopher A. (2018). The transformation of Greek amulets in Roman imperial times. Philadelphia: University of Pennsylvania Press. ISBN 9780812249354.

=== Articles ===
- Faraone, Christopher A. (1988). "Hermes but No Marrow: Another Look at a Puzzling Magical Spell". Zeitschrift für Papyrologie und Epigraphik. 72: 279–286. ISSN 0084-5388. JSTOR 20186827.
- Faraone, Christopher A. (1991). "Binding and Burying the Forces of Evil: The Defensive Use of "Voodoo Dolls" in Ancient Greece". Classical Antiquity. 10 (2): 165–220. doi:10.2307/25010949. ISSN 0278-6656. JSTOR 25010949.
- Faraone, Christopher A. (1996). "Taking the "Nestor's Cup Inscription" Seriously: Erotic Magic and Conditional Curses in the Earliest Inscribed Hexameters". Classical Antiquity. 15 (1): 77–112. doi:10.2307/25011032. ISSN 0278-6656. JSTOR 25011032.
- Faraone, Christopher A. (1997). "Salvation and Female Heroics in the Parodos of Aristophanes' Lysistrata". The Journal of Hellenic Studies. 117: 38–59. doi:10.2307/632549. ISSN 0075-4269. JSTOR 632549.
- Faraone, Christopher A. (31 January 2000). "Handbooks and Anthologies: The Collection of Greek and Egyptian Incantations in Late Hellenistic Egypt". Archiv für Religionsgeschichte. 2 (1). doi:10.1515/9783110234183.195.
- Faraone, Christopher A. (2001). "The Undercutter, the Woodcutter, and Greek Demon Names Ending In -Tomos (Hom. Hymn to Dem 228-29)". The American Journal of Philology. 122 (1): 1–10. ISSN 0002-9475. JSTOR 1562015.
- Faraone, Christopher Athanasious (December 2020). "SIMAETHA GOT IT RIGHT, AFTER ALL: THEOCRITUS, IDYLL 2, A COURTESan's PANTRY AND a LOST GREEK TRADITION OF HEXAMETRICAL CURSES". The Classical Quarterly. 70 (2): 650–663. doi:10.1017/s0009838821000070.
- Faraone, Christopher A. (31 December 2021). "The Lead Tablet from Tongres: Curse or amulet?". Kernos. 34 (34): 219–244. doi:10.4000/kernos.3881.
