= Mary Boatwright =

Mary Boatwright may refer to:

- Mary H. Boatwright (1920–2002), American politician
- Mary T. Boatwright (born 1952), American professor
