= CIL 4.5296 =

Poem found graffitied in Pompeii

CIL 4.5296 CLE 950
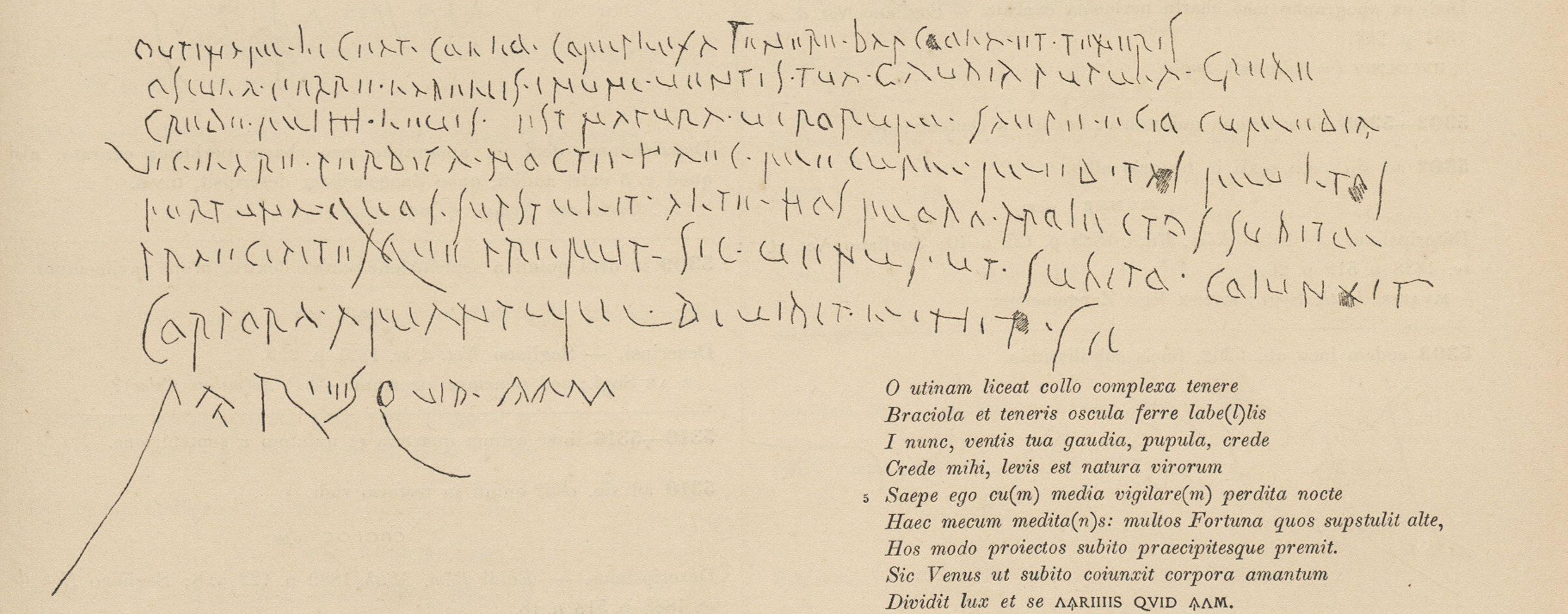
- CIL 4.5296, transcribed in the Corpus Inscriptionum Latinarum
- Type: Roman graffiti
- Material: Inscribed plaster
- Size: 74 × 38 cm
- Writing: Roman cursive
- Created: Pax Romana, Pompeii
- Discovered: 1888; Pompeii, Kingdom of Italy
- Present location: National Archaeological Museum
- Culture: Roman

CIL 4.5296 (or CLE 950) (Note: CIL is the Corpus Inscriptionum Latinarum; CLE is the Carmina Latina Epigraphica ("Latin Verse Inscriptions").) is a poem found graffitied on the wall of a hallway in Pompeii. Discovered in 1888, it is one of the longest and most elaborate surviving graffiti texts from the town, and may be the only known love poem from one woman to another from the Latin world. The poem is nine verses long, breaking off in the middle of the ninth verse; a single line in a different hand is written underneath. It is in the collection of the National Archaeological Museum, Naples.

== Inscription ==
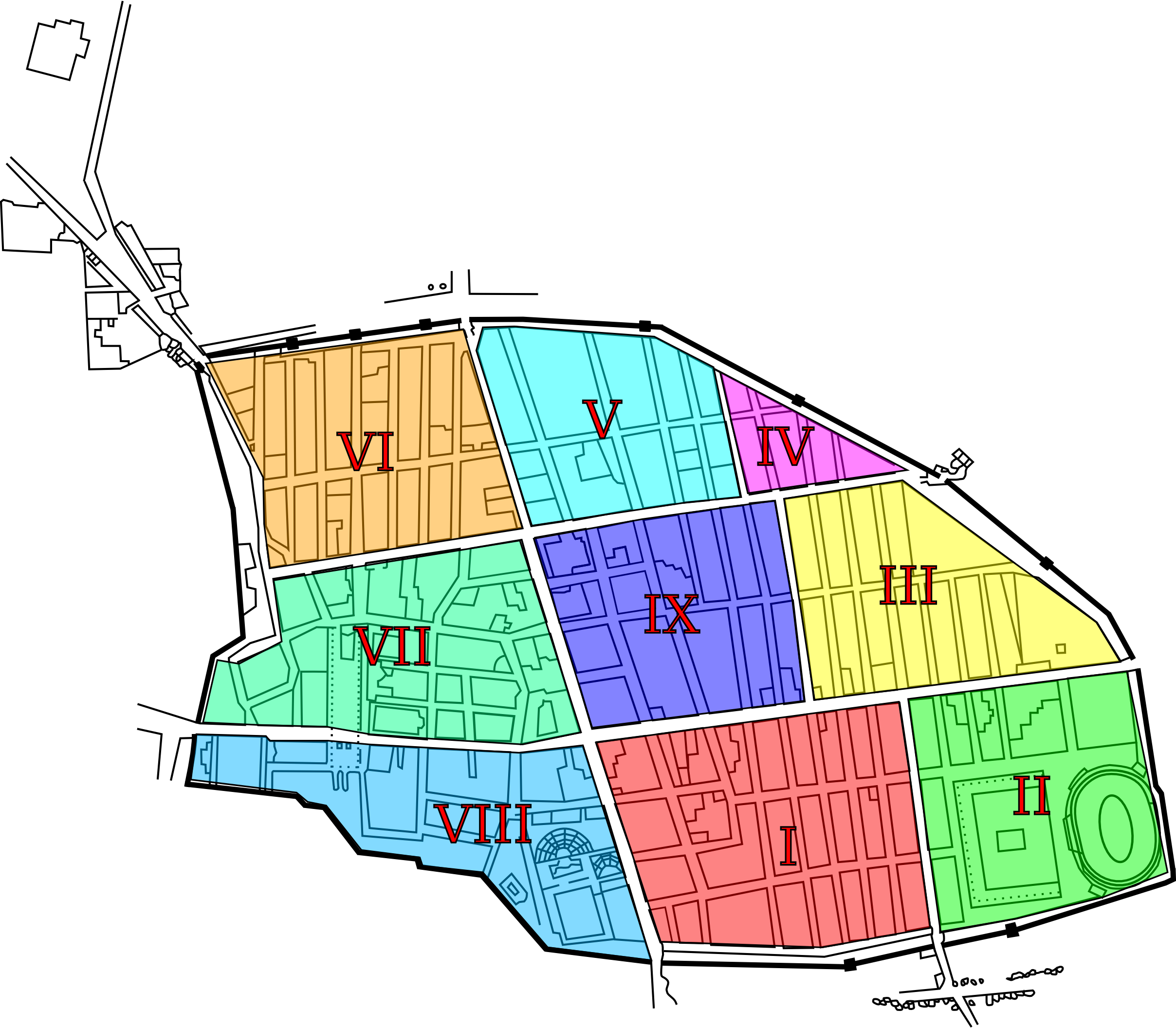
Map of the regions of Pompeii. CIL 4.5296 was found in region nine (IX), in the centre of the town.

CIL 4.5296 was discovered in 1888 by Italian archaeologists excavating the Roman town of Pompeii, scratched into the wall of the hallway of house six (Note: The Carmina Latina Epigraphica says that the inscription was found at the nearby Doctor's House, though both the original excavation report and the Corpus Inscriptionum Latinarum say house six.) of insula nine, in region nine of the town. The poem was first published by Antonio Sogliano in that year's excavation report.

The poem is inscribed over seven lines of text, in a neat Roman cursive hand, with words divided by interpuncts. The inscription is written carefully inside the decoratively painted borders of a wall panel. It is followed by three words written in a different hand, which cross the painted border. Several other short inscriptions were found on the same wall, below CIL 4.5296, in larger letters.

The inscription is preserved on a slab of plaster measuring 74 × 38 cm, along with four other pieces of graffiti. It is in the collection of the National Archaeological Museum, Naples.

== Poem ==
O utinam liceat collo complexa tenere
braciola et teneris oscula ferre label(l)is
i nunc, ventis tua gaudia, pupula, crede
crede mihi levis est natura virorum
saepe ego cu(m) media vigilare(m) perdita nocte
haec mecum medita(n)s: multos Fortuna quos supstulit alte,
hos modo proiectos subito praecipitesque premit.
sic Venus ut subito coiunxit corpora amantum
dividit lux et se...

Translation:

Oh, if only I could hold your little arms wrapped around my neck
and press kisses to your tender little lips.
Go then, little doll, trust your happiness to the winds.
Believe me, the nature of men (Note: Unlike the English word "men", which can refer to humans in general, the Latin "virorum" specifically refers to adult males.) is fickle.
Often I would lie awake, lost in the middle of the night,
Thinking to myself: many whom Fortune has lifted up high,
those, suddenly hurled away/abandoned and falling headlong, she then oppresses.
So too, after Venus has unexpectedly joined the bodies of lovers,
daylight divides them and...

The text is one of the longest and most elaborate pieces of graffiti to survive from Pompeii. The poem was probably not composed by the writer of the graffiti; the graffiti writer instead seems to have copied out a poem which they imperfectly remembered. Though inscribed over seven lines of text, the poem is metrically nine verses long, with the final verse unfinished. It is unknown why the poem ends mid-verse: perhaps the author was interrupted, or could not remember the end of the poem.

=== Metre ===
The meter is somewhat irregular: three verses are correct hexameters, and the text may originally have been made up entirely of hexameters, or a mixture of hexameters and pentameters.

The first verse of the poem scans correctly as a hexameter; verses two and three can be easily emended to read as a pentameter and hexameter respectively. If the poem were composed in elegiac couplets, verse four should again be a pentameter; it is easier, however, to emend it so it reads as a hexameter, suggesting the poem was not originally in regular elegiac couplets. Kristina Milnor suggests that the reason for the erratic pattern of what were apparently originally pentametric and hexametrical lines is if CIL 4.5296 is a cento, made up of verses from two or more different poems stitched together to make a new composition. This form of composition is known from other graffiti from Pompeii: for instance CIL 4.9847, a two line inscription made up of one hexameter verse from Ovid's Amores and one from Propertius I.1.

=== Text ===
The text of CIL 4.5296 is relatively clear, though there is some disagreement about the interpretation of the word meditas in verse six. In his initial publication of the poem, Sogliano emended the word to meditaris, and Kristina Milnor argues that meditas is correct as a non-deponent form of meditaris. (Note: In Classical Latin, meditor (to think on, reflect on) is a deponent verb. If it were non-deponent, meditas would be correct, and this use of non-deponent forms of deponent verbs is common in vulgar Latin.) However, Luca Graverini argues that the word order suggests that the verb in the sentence should be in the first person, agreeing with ego ("I") in verse five, but meditas is in the second person; additionally, vigilarem in verse five is in the past tense, and so the next verb probably would be also. Alternatively, August Mau's suggestion of meditans is widely accepted by scholars, though this leaves the sentence without a main verb.

=== Interpretation ===
The poem as it is preserved in the Pompeii inscription is written in the voice of a woman (identified by the feminine perdita in verse 5), addressed to another woman (pupula, "my little darling", in verse 3). (Note: Alternatively, Craig Williams suggests that it is possible to read the poem not as an address to another woman, but as a soliloquy "in a Catullan manner", in which the poet addresses herself on the subject of her past painful experiences with men.) As the poem is usually interpreted as a love poem, many scholars have attempted to find a way of interpreting either the speaker or the beloved as a man rather than a woman. Equally, many scholars have argued that the poem was neither composed by a female author, nor inscribed by a woman: Milnor cites G.P. Goold for what she identifies as the traditional view of the poem's authorship: "with the realization that the graffito does not reflect a real-life situation disappears all likelihood that it was composed or inscribed by a girl". Graverini, however, argues that the "most reasonable assumption" is that the poem's author was a woman. If the inscription is a love poem written by one woman to another, it is the only such poem known to survive from the ancient Latin-speaking world.

The first three verses of the poem focus on the beloved, and comment on her individual body-parts: her "little arms" and "tender little lips" (braciola et teneris... labellis). The use of diminutives in this section is reminiscent of Catullus, and the only other literary source of the word braciolum is in Catullus 61. The end of this sentence is marked by both the end of verse three, and the end of line two of the inscription.

The next section of the poem is more sombre in tone and changes its focus to the lover lying awake, a well-known trope of ancient love poetry, appearing in, for example, the midnight poem often attributed to Sappho, Ovid's Amores and Ars amatoria, and other Pompeian graffiti such as CIL 4.2146. The claim in verse 4 that "the nature of men is fickle" is an inversion of a common theme in love poetry: almost always it is women who are so condemned. The poem then addresses the fickleness of fortune; another common trope. This provides a link to the final lines of the poem, which address the instability of love.

The poem has often been seen as a paraklausithyron – a form of love poem where the lover laments the door that separates them from their beloved. Frank Olin Copley described the poem as "in the manner of a paraclausithyron" in 1939, and many scholars have followed him in this identification. Graverini disputes this, arguing that the content of the poem does not support this conclusion (since the poem neither mentions anything physically keeping the lovers apart, nor contains a plea to be let in to visit the beloved; the two "most distinctive features" of the paraklausithyron) and the context of the inscription actively counts against it, because the earliest reports on the inscription describe it as being inside the door, while the paraklausithyron interpretation relies on it having been found outside.

== paries quid ama ==
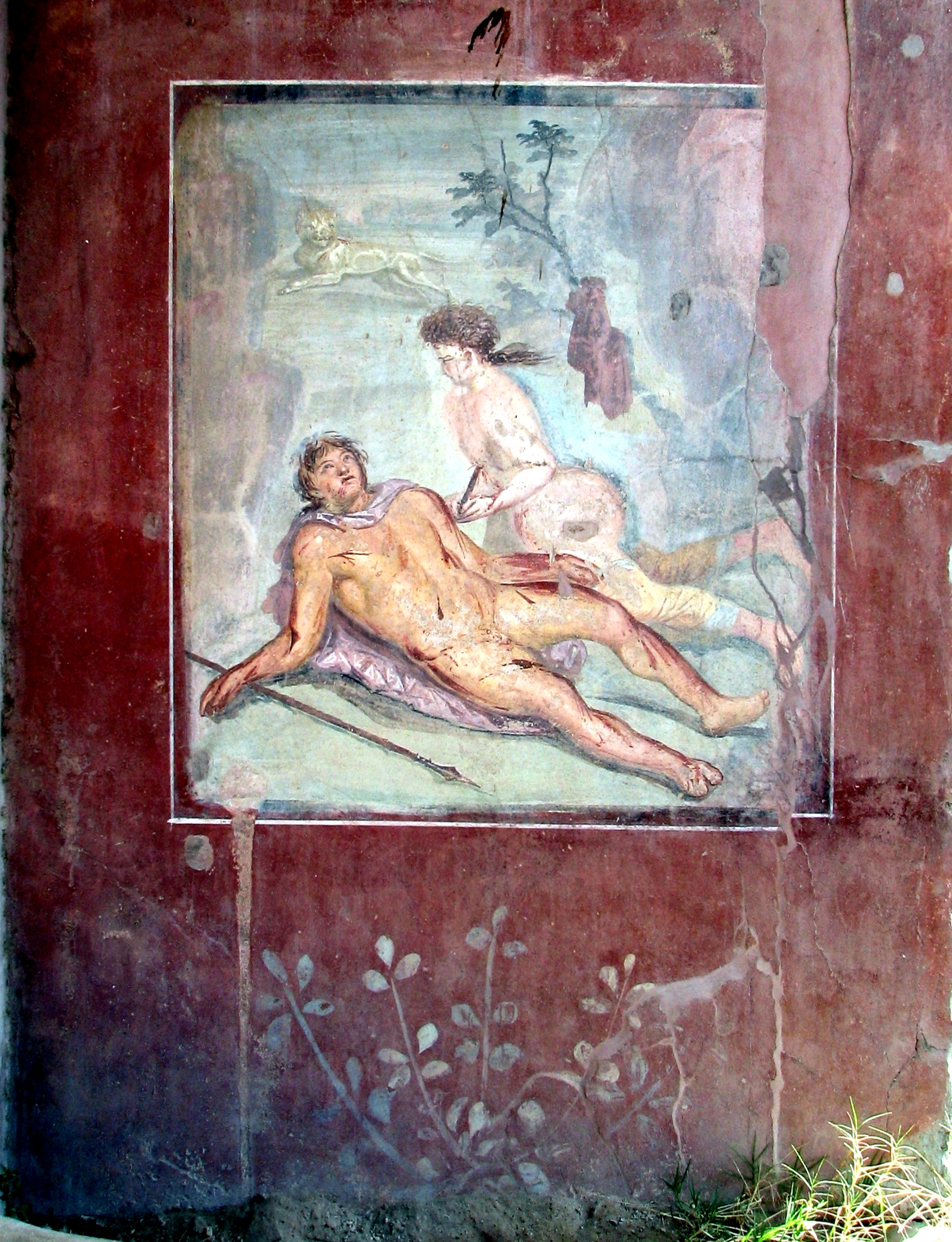
Fresco of Pyramus and Thisbe from the House of Loreius Tiburtinus in Pompeii

The eighth line of the inscription, apparently written in a different hand, has attracted several different readings. In the Corpus Inscriptionem Latinarum, it is transcribed as AARIIIIS QVID AAM. Matteo Della Corte suggests that the line should be read Marius quidam ("Some Marius"), as a fake signature to the poem. Antonio Varone suggests parees quid amant, reading it with the previous line as dividit lux et separees [separes] quid amant.

Sogliano and Franz Bücheler both print paries quid ama, and Graverini and Milnor both accept this reading, suggesting that it derives from a line from Ovid's version of the story of Pyramus and Thisbe in his Metamorphoses : "invide" dicebant "paries, quid amantibus obstans?" ("'Jealous wall', they said, 'why are you standing between these lovers?'").

== Works cited ==
- Copley, Frank Olin (1939). "A Paraclausithyron from Pompeii: A Study of CIL IV Suppl. 5296". American Journal of Philology. 60 (3).
- Goold, G. P. (1998). "A Paraclausithyron from Pompeii". In Knox, Peter E.; Foss, Clive (eds.). Style and Tradition. Studies in Honor of Wendell Clausen. Beiträge zur Altertumskunde. Stuttgart and Leipzig: Teubner. ISBN 3-519-07641-1.
- Graverini, Luca (2014). "Ovidian Graffiti: Love, Genre and Gender on a Wall in Pompeii. A New Study of CIL IV 5296 - CLE 950". Incontri di Filogia Classica. 12.
- Graverini, Luca (2017). "Further Thoughts on CIL IV, 5296 – CLE 950: Textual Problems, Structure, and Gender Issues". Latomus. 76.
- Matera, Robert (2022). "Two Case Studies on Desire and Deniability in Queer History". Arethusa. 55 (2). doi:10.1353/are.2022.0007.
- Mau, Augustus; Zangmeister, Karl Friedrich, eds. (1909). Corpus Inscriptionum Latinarum. Vol. IV Supplement II. Berlin: Georg Reimer.
- Milnor, Kristina (2014). Graffiti & the Literary Landscape in Roman Pompeii. Oxford University Press.
- Natoli, Barolo A.; Pitts, Angela; Hallett, Judith P. (2022). Ancient Women Writers of Greece and Rome. Routledge.
- Williams, Craig A. (2014). "Sexual Themes in Greek and Latin Graffiti". In Hubbard, Thomas K. (ed.). A Companion to Greek and Roman Sexualities. Blackwell.
