= Jakob Larsen (historian) =

American classical scholar (1888–1974)

Jakob Aall Ottesen Larsen (March 1, 1888 – September 2, 1974) was an American classical scholar. He was known principally for his research on the political status of Ancient Greece.

== Biography ==
Jakob Aall Ottesen Larsen was born in Decorah, Iowa. He was the son of Peter Laurentius Larsen, founding president of Luther College, and his second wife Ingeborg Astrup (1846–1923) He received a BA from Luther College in 1908 and MA from Yale in 1911. In 1914, he earned a Rhodes scholarship. He studied at Oxford University from 1914 to 1920. In 1928, Larsen received his Ph.D. from Harvard. The University of Vermont awarded him the LL.D. in 1953, and Luther College presented him with his D.Litt. in 1961.

Larsen worked as an assistant professor of history at the University of Washington from 1921 to 1926. From 1926 through 1929, he served in the same capacity at Ohio State University. He was promoted to associate professor and continued in that capacity at Ohio State University until 1930. In 1930–1943 he served as an associate professor of history at the University of Chicago, then as a professor (1943–1953, and as a professor emeritus from 1953 to 1971. Larsen was the managing editor of Classical Philology from 1939 to 1951. From 1951 to 1952 he was chairman of the American Philological Association. He served as the Sather Professor of Classical Literature at the University of California-Berkeley in 1954 and as visiting professor of history at Rutgers University in 1956 and 1957. He was also visiting professor of history at the University of Texas in 1960 and at the University of Missouri from 1960 to 1971.

== Personal life ==
He was married to Clarice (Grindeland) Larsen (1886–1974). He died during 1974 in Columbia, Missouri. Both he and his wife were buried in the Lutheran Cemetery Winneshiek County, Iowa.

== Works ==
- Representative Government in Greek and Roman History, 1955 (American Philological Association's Charles J. Goodwin Award of Merit, 1957)
- Greek Federal States: Their Institutions and History, 1968
