= Anabasis of Alexander =

2nd-century AD work by Arrian of Nicomedia

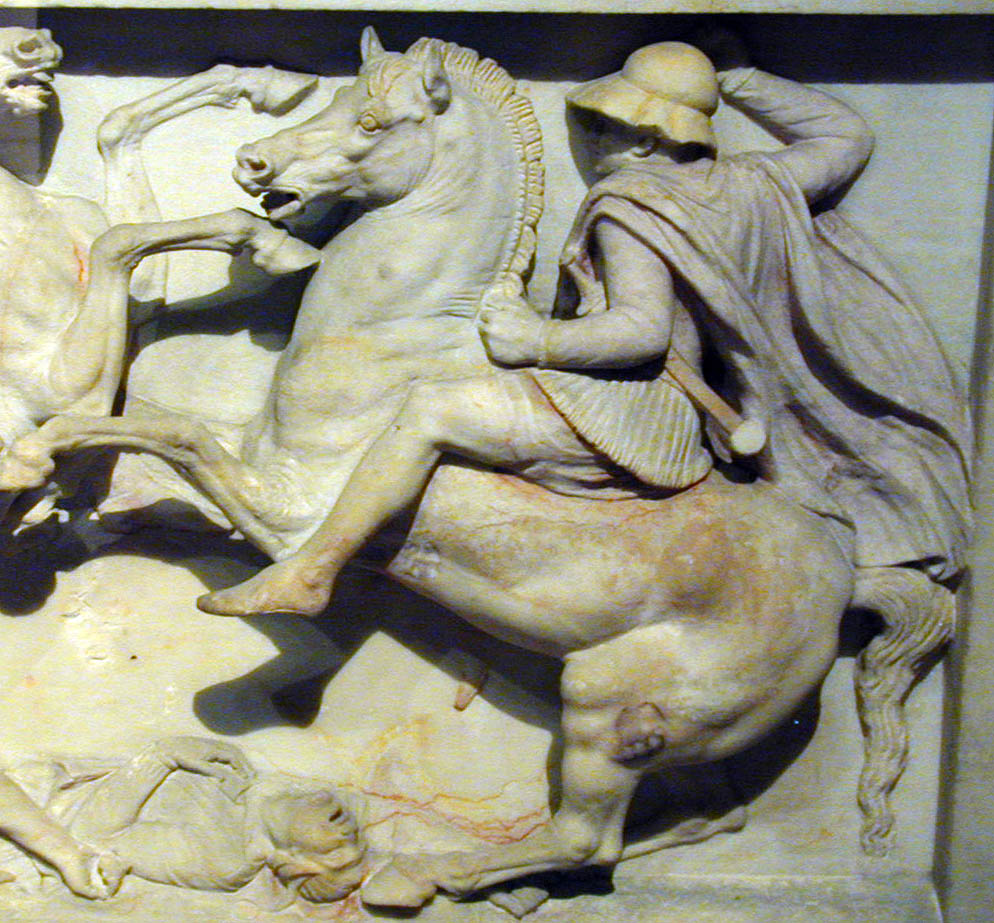
Cavalryman on the Alexander Sarcophagus from Sidon, Lebanon

The Anabasis of Alexander (Ancient Greek: Ἀλεξάνδρου Ἀνάβασις, Alexándrou Anábasis; Latin: Anabasis Alexandri) was composed by Arrian of Nicomedia in the second century AD, most probably during the reign of Hadrian. The Anabasis (which survives complete in seven books) is a history of the campaigns of Alexander the Great, specifically his conquest of the Persian Empire between 336 and 323 BC.

The Anabasis is by far the fullest surviving account of Alexander's conquest of the Persian Empire. It is primarily a military history, reflecting the content of Arrian's model, Xenophon's Anabasis; the work begins with Alexander's accession to the Macedonian throne in 336 BC, and has nothing to say about Alexander's early life (in contrast, say, to Plutarch's Life of Alexander). Nor does Arrian aim to provide a complete history of the Greek-speaking world during Alexander's reign.

== Historical background ==
Both the unusual title "Anabasis" (literally "a journey up-country from the sea") and the work's seven-book structure reflect Arrian's emulation (in structure, style, and content) of the Greek historian Xenophon, whose own Anabasis in seven books concerned the earlier campaign "up-country" of Cyrus the Younger in 401 BC.

Arrian's Anabasis is our most complete account of Alexander's campaigns. Arrian writes his own anabasis roughly 400 years after the campaigns of Alexander occurred. As such, he relies on several participants in the campaigns as primary sources for his writings. His main sources for his own writing are Ptolemy and Aristobulus.

Arrian relies on the lost contemporary histories of Alexander's campaign by Ptolemy and Aristobulus and, for his later books, Nearchus. One of Arrian's main aims in writing his history seems to have been to correct the standard "Vulgate" narrative of Alexander's reign that was current in his own day, primarily associated with the lost writings of the historian Cleitarchus.

Ptolemy was a general within the army and would later become a king in his own right, establishing the Ptolemaic dynasty in Egypt. Ptolemy’s writings are thought to have exaggerated his own role within the campaign. He also actively excluded detailing the successes of his rivals, following the death of Alexander. Ptolemy also reconfigured his closeness to Alexander alluding that they were half-brothers, which we know is not the case. This was likely to boost his status, potentially leading him to his monarchical position.

Aristobulus is thought to have been a military engineer or some other non-fighting member of the army. His writings are seemingly more favorable towards Alexander. When compared between multiple sources he always seems to be the kindest towards the King.

== Content ==
Anabasis of Alexander, 1575

The Anabasis gives a broadly chronological account of the reign of Alexander the Great of Macedon (336–323 BC), with a particular focus on military matters. After a short Preface concerning Arrian's sources, the seven books describe the reign of Alexander the Great.

Book 1: This book covers the early years of Alexander's reign (336–334 BC), including notable descriptions of Alexander's sack of Thebes in 335 and the battle of the Granicus in summer 334 BC. It also details the siege and capture of Miletus, and the siege and destruction of Halicarnassus.

Book 2: The majority of this book is dominated by three large set-piece military operations: the campaign and Battle of Issus (333 BC) and the sieges of Tyre and Gaza (332 BC). This book also recounts the defeat of King Darius of Persia and how Alexander treated Darius's family after his death. The trial of the Gordian Knot is also included in this book.

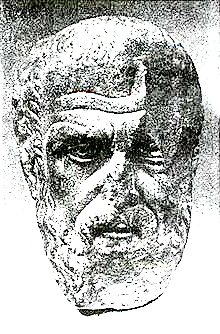
Arrian of Nicomedia

Book 3: Book three begins with an account of Alexander in Egypt, including his visit to the oracle of Zeus-Ammon at Siwah (winter 332/331 BC), before turning to the battle of Gaugamela and defeat of Darius III (331 BC). The latter half of the book describes Alexander's pursuit of Darius through northern Iran, the revolt of the pretender Bessus, and the deaths of Philotas and Parmenion (331–329 BC).

Book 4: This book begins with describing the long Sogdian campaign of 329–327 BC against Bessus, Spitamenes, and Oxyartes, and the early stages of the campaigns in the Punjab (327–326 BC), with a notable departure from chronological sequence at 4.7–14, where Arrian collects many of the most notorious stories tending to Alexander's discredit in a single apologetic digression (the killing of Cleitus, the proskynesis affair, the pages' conspiracy and the death of Callisthenes).

Book 5: This book continues the narrative of the Indian campaign of Alexander the Great of 326 BC, including Alexander's arrival at Nysa, the battle with Porus at the Hydaspes river, and the decision at the Hyphasis not to push on further into India.

Book 6: The journey down the Indus to the Indian Ocean (326–325 BC) is described, including the increasingly brutal violence inflicted on the local inhabitants by the Macedonians en route (notably at the Malli town), and the crossing of the Gedrosian Desert (325–324 BC). This book also details a worrying injury for Alexander and the worrying of his soldiers as he suffered. Later followed by his recovery.

Book 7: The last of the books recounts the events of Alexander's final year, including the Susa marriages, the Opis mutiny, the multiple predictions and omens of Alexander's own death, the death of Hephaestion, and Alexander's own death (324–323 BC). The very end of this book concludes with speculation about how Alexander died, and whether it was by poisoning or something else.

== Criticism ==
Arrian's Anabasis has traditionally been regarded as the most reliable extant narrative source for Alexander's campaigns. Since the 1970s, however, a more critical view of Arrian has become widespread, due largely to the work of A. B. Bosworth, who has drawn scholars' attention to Arrian's tendency to hagiography and apologia, not to mention several passages where Arrian can be shown (by comparison with other ancient sources) to be downright misleading. Bosworth claims Arrian is inexperienced when it comes to primary source collection and evaluation. He writes that Arrian is a skillful writer, but his work on Alexander can't be viewed as good historiography if his material selection is poor.

Arrian is known to idealize Alexander, often writing of him as a saint or god. This does not, however, mean that Arrian's writing is unusable. Arrian's work is still the most complete historiography of Alexander's campaigns. And, given Ptolemy and Aristobulus' works are lost it is a difficult task separating Arrian's own ideas from their previous writings.

== Modern editions ==
The only complete English translation of Arrian available online is a rather antiquated translation by E. J. Chinnock, published in 1884. The original Greek text used by the Perseus Digital Library is the standard A. G. Roos Teubner edition published at Leipzig in 1907.

Probably the most widely used scholarly English translation is the Loeb Classical Library edition (with facing Greek text), in two volumes. The work first appeared in 1929 and was later revised with a new introduction and appendices by P. A. Brunt in 1976.

An English translation by Aubrey de Sélincourt appeared in Penguin Classics in 1958. This edition was revised and annotated by J. R. Hamilton in 1971.

The Landmark Ancient Histories, edited by Robert B. Strassler, includes The Landmark Arrian: The Campaigns of Alexander, edited by James Romm (Professor of Classics at Bard College, 2010) and translated by Pamela Mensch. The Landmark edition includes extensive margin notes and maps.

A new translation by Martin Hammond with introduction and notes by John Atkinson appeared in the Oxford World's Classics series in 2013.
