= Bruce Frier =

American social scientist, legal historian, author (born 1943)

Bruce W. Frier
- Born: August 31, 1943 (age 83); Chicago, Illinois
- Occupations: Social scientist, legal historian, and author

Academic background
- Education: B.A., Classics and History; Ph.D., Classics
- Alma mater: Trinity College; Princeton University
- Thesis: Roman Historiography from the Annales Maximi up to Cato Censorius (1969)
- Doctoral advisor: T.J. Luce

Bruce W. Frier (born August 31, 1943) is an American social scientist, legal historian, and author. He is the John and Teresa D'Arms Distinguished University Professor of Classics and Roman Law, and Professor Emeritus of Classical Studies and of Law.

Frier has authored several books and many articles on Roman legal, economic and social history, including Landlords and Tenants in Imperial Rome, The Rise of the Roman Jurists, and casebooks on the Roman law of delict, Roman family law, and the Roman law of Contracts. He is most known for his contributions to this field and, among other honors, is the recipient of the 1983 Goodwin Award of Merit from The Society for Classical Studies (SCS, formerly known as the American Philological Association) for The Rise of the Roman Jurists.

Frier is a Fellow of American Academy of Arts and Sciences, a Resident Fellow of The American Philosophical Society, and a Fellow of the American Academy in Rome. He was the General Editor of a three-volume annotated translation of The Codex of Justinian published in 2016.

== Education ==
Born in Chicago, Illinois, Frier earned a B.A. in Classics and History from Trinity College (Hartford) in 1964. He was also subsequently awarded a fellowship from the American Academy in Rome, where he spent two years from 1966 to 1968. In 1970, he received his Ph.D. in classics at Princeton University.

== Career ==
Frier started his academic career as an instructor in the Latin Department at Bryn Mawr College from 1968 to 1969. Subsequently, he joined the Department of Classical Studies at University of Michigan as an assistant professor in 1969, was promoted to associate professor in 1975, and then became a full Professor in 1983, holding this position until 2013. In 2004, he was appointed to the Frank O. Copley Collegiate Professorship in Classics and Roman Law for five years. He also held an appointment as a professor at the University of Michigan Law School from 1986 till 2022, and as the Henry King Ransom Professor of Law from 1994 to 2008. He was awarded the John and Teresa D'Arms Distinguished University Professorship in Classics and Roman Law in 2008. He has been serving as a Professor Emeritus at the University of Michigan Law School since 2022.

Frier has held various positions in faculty governance. He was the Committee Chair and principal author of the 2004 Provostal report on The Campus Climate for Transgender, Bisexual, Lesbian, and Gay (TBLG) Faculty, Staff, and Students and the 2009 Faculty Statement on Academic Freedom. He received the Distinguished Faculty Governance Award in 2010, From 2006 to 2010, he served as a Senior Fellow of the Michigan Society of Fellows, and has been an Emeritus Trustee of the American Academy in Rome since 1993.

== Research ==
Frier's research is focused in Roman law and legal history, Roman social, economic, and demographic history, alongside an examination of Hellenistic and Roman historiography, specifically the works of Polybius, Sallust, and Livy. Additionally, he is interested in exploring legal theory, sociology of law, classical and modern rhetoric, and related disciplines. Du Plessis delivered a comprehensive review of the Festschrift honoring Bruce Frier, Ancient Law, Ancient Society. He analyzed the volume's contents, chapters, and themes while underscoring the intellectual significance of Frier's scholarship and his scholarly legacy. Du Plessis also noted that, “Frier, like a veritable Irnerius, has profoundly influenced the study of Roman law in the Anglophone world, both through his own work and that of his former students.”

=== Roman legal, economic and social history ===
Throughout his career, Frier has contributed to the field of Classics and Roman Law, authoring numerous publications. Shedding light on the social and economic conditions of ancient Rome, he suggested a more complex model of the rental market than previously thought, highlighting that the range of accommodation available to the urban masses was often effectively limited by the wealth and other social characteristics of the prospective tenant. One of his earliest works, Landlords and Tenants in Imperial Rome, provided a sociological understanding of law in imperial Rome and law's role in premodern societies. He used archaeological data, literary texts, and legal texts to demonstrate that the upper class, including senatorial families, lived in rented apartments, and that the Roman law of urban lease was primarily intended for them rather than the lower class. Honoré called it a “fascinating contribution to Roman legal history that has implications for legal theory and comparative law”.

Having called Frier a "classicist who has acquired a remarkable understanding of the legal process", Stein stated that, "Frier gives us a detailed study of the law of urban leases, related for the first time to the reality of the Roman rental mark". Whereas, highlighting the need for a more comprehensive analysis, Triantaphyllopoulos wrote that it is, "original and opens new avenues for the study of Roman law, I hope the author overcomes his expressed scruples and extends his study to the lower classes and Roman Egypt."

Afterwards, in his work, The Rise of the Roman Jurists: Studies in Cicero's "Pro Caecina", Frier discussed the factors that led to the professionalization of law during the later Roman Republic. According to Gordon, the book is an "effective interdisciplinary study," Cohen regarded it as "a rich and exciting treatment of an important topic," Birks praised Frier's scholarship and "firmness of judgment and clarity of exposition," and Watson found it "stimulating" despite disagreeing with its conclusions.

Among the other subjects, Frier has addressed in his articles and books are Roman demography, natural fertility and family limitation in Roman marriage, the Roman origins of public trust doctrine, the economy of Greece and Rome, Cicero's urban property management, and the development of Roman private law and the judicial system during the 70s and 60s BCE.

In summing up the method that Frier developed in his scholarship, Du Plessis observed that: "while it acknowledges the importance of the different generations of Roman jurists, it goes much further in trying to contextualise their positions. ... [W]hat sets Frier’s scholarship apart is his training in the common law and his engagement with legal realism and the sociology of law."

Frier also led a team of scholars of Roman law as the General Editor of The Codex of Justinian translation project. The team based their translation on the manuscript of Fred H. Blume, who translated the text in the 1920s; it had remained unpublished for almost a century until it was rediscovered in the library of the University of Wyoming Law School. In a review of this 2016 editorial work, Zetzel described the translation as "impressive" and commended the careful handling of technical legal terminology, noting that "where literalism is impossible, the Latin phrase is repeated in parentheses within the translation for clarity; technical passages are often annotated". Du Plessis acknowledged him for explaining the project's aims and complexities, was of the view that "this should be required reading..." and highlighted that "There are also important issues about the 'apparatus criticus' that are worth noting."

=== Casebooks on Roman law ===
Frier's work in Roman law has featured several casebooks, including those on Roman family law, the Roman law of contracts, and the Roman law of delict. He developed the delicts casebook, modeled after Herbert Hausmaninger's German casebooks on Roman property and contract law in 1989 for his Roman law courses. Focusing on the Roman law of private wrongs akin to Anglo-American torts, he presented 171 cases from pre-classical and classical jurists' writings, while introducing fundamental principles of Roman law and their impact on contemporary legal systems. Watson acknowledged him as the "most distinguished American scholar of Roman law" and commended the book as an "excellent introduction for the college Classics student to the law school experience," Johnston emphasized its usefulness as a teaching tool to introduce students to "some notion of the individuality of the jurists," and Harrington characterized the work as "well done and useful…because it relies upon the original Latin sources followed by a translation and explains legal principles in a clear and effective manner." Building on this foundation, his next book, A Casebook on Roman Family Law, co-authored with McGinn, providing insights into Roman social history and offered an in-depth analysis of Roman family law during the early Roman Empire, with a focus on the legal aspects of Roman households. Through 235 representative legal texts, it also provided an introduction to the basic legal issues related to the ordinary families of Roman citizens. Bradley in his book review regarded the book as "far more than a teaching text and... welcome contribution to Roman family studies at large."

Over the past few decades, Frier has focused his research studies on contract law. In A Casebook on the Roman Law of Contracts, he explored the writings of Roman lawyers regarding the law of contracts, with particular emphasis on stipulation and sale. The book featured 235 cases from the Digest of Justinian, offering a comprehensive view of contract rules and judgments in Roman courts, and also discussed other contracts, contract-related issues, and Roman legal thinking on unjustified enrichment. His continued investigations into this subject have also led to the publication of a law textbook The Modern Law of Contract (now in its 4th edition), which provided coverage of key topics for LLB and GDL courses in 2022.

== Awards and honors ==
- 1964 – Phi Beta Kappa; Pi Gamma Mu, Trinity College
- 1966–1968 – Fellow, American Academy in Rome
- 1983 – Goodwin Award of Merit, American Philological Association
- 1984–1985 – Guggenheim Fellowship
- 1992–1993 – Fellowship, National Endowment for the Humanities
- 1993–present – Fellow, The American Academy of Arts and Sciences
- 2003–present – Resident Member, American Philosophical Society
- 2017 – Activism Award, Lambda Classical Caucus
- 2026 -- Doctor of Letters (D.Litt.) honoris causa, Tulane University

== Bibliography ==
=== Selected books ===
- The Rise of the Roman Jurists: Studies in Cicero's Pro Caecina (1985) ISBN 9780691611563
- A Casebook on the Roman Law of Delict (1989) ISBN 9781555402679
- The Demography of Roman Egypt (1994) ISBN 9780521461238
- A Casebook on Roman Family Law (2003) ISBN 9780195161861
- A Casebook on the Roman Law of Contracts (2021) ISBN 9780197581117
- The Modern Law of Contracts (2022) ISBN 9781003143277

=== Selected articles ===
- Frier, B. W. (1971). Sulla's Propaganda: The Collapse of the Cinnan Republic. The American Journal of Philology, 92(4), 585–604.
- Frier, B. W. (1977). The rental market in early imperial Rome. The Journal of Roman Studies, 67, 27–37.
- Frier, B. W. (1978). Cicero's management of his urban properties. The Classical Journal, 74(1), 1–6.
- Frier, B. W. (1994). Natural fertility and family limitation in Roman marriage. Classical Philology, 89(4), 318–333.
