= Richard Talbert =

British-American historian and classicist (born 1947)

Richard J. A. Talbert
- Born: 26 April 1947 (age 79); United Kingdom
- Education: Corpus Christi College, Cambridge
- Occupations: Ancient historian, classicist
- Known for: Roman Senate, Tabula Peutingeriana, Barrington Atlas of the Greek and Roman World

Richard John Alexander Talbert (born 26 April 1947) is a British-American contemporary ancient historian and classicist on the faculty of the University of North Carolina at Chapel Hill, where he was William Rand Kenan, Jr., Professor of History (1988-2020) and then Research Professor in charge of the Ancient World Mapping Center until his retirement in 2024. Talbert is a scholar of ancient geography and ideas of space in the ancient Mediterranean world.

== Education ==
Talbert received his education at The King's School, Canterbury and Corpus Christi College, Cambridge, where he gained Double First Class Honours in Classics (1968), followed by a PhD (1972) directed by F.H. Sandbach and M.I. Finley.

== Career ==
Talbert was on the faculty of the Queen’s University, Belfast (assistant to senior lecturer) from 1970 to 1985. After publishing Timoleon and the Revival of Greek Sicily (1974), he extended his research into Roman history and produced The Senate of Imperial Rome (1984). By examining the workings of the institution for the first time, this book revises the longstanding assumption that the senate during the Principate barely retained a meaningful role. The book won the American Philological Association’s Goodwin Award of Merit (1987). In 1978-79 Talbert was Herodotus Fellow at the Institute for Advanced Study, Princeton. In 1985 he became professor of history at McMaster University, Hamilton, Ontario, Canada. A basic Atlas of Classical History edited by him appeared in 1985 (revised edition 2023), followed by a Penguin Classic Plutarch on Sparta in 1988 (expanded 2005).

In 1988 Talbert moved to the University of North Carolina, Chapel Hill, and accepted a commission from the American Philological Association to produce the first major classical atlas since the 1870s. The planning and progress of this international collaborative effort are a key theme in his book Challenges of Mapping the Classical World (2019). The resulting Barrington Atlas of the Greek and Roman World and Map-by-Map Directory were published in 2000. Around 200 scholars were involved, and over $4.5 million in funding was raised. Talbert then established and created an endowment for, the Ancient World Mapping Center at UNC Chapel Hill. It has continued to take the lead in exploiting digital technology to launch a wide range of initiatives, in particular the Pleiades gazetteer.

A monograph by Talbert (2010), accompanied by extensive web materials, offers fresh thinking about the design and purpose of the Tabula Peutingeriana, the one surviving large Roman map (in a medieval copy). Worldview is again the focus of his further monograph (2017) on a neglected type of portable sundial, one incorporating a list of cities and regions with their latitude figures (in Greek or Latin). The collection World and Hour in Roman Minds (2023) assembles many of Talbert’s shorter contributions in this field. In addition, he has (co-)edited numerous volumes relating to space, travel, and communication not only in classical antiquity but also in other cultures worldwide at different periods. His translation (with Brian Turner, 2022) Pliny the Elder’s World spans the Natural History’s description of the universe and the Earth.

For students at the survey level, Talbert collaborated with Mary Boatwright and Daniel Gargola (and later Noel Lenski) on The Romans: From Village to Empire (2004, revised 2012), and on its abridgment A Brief History of the Romans (2006, revised 2014). For college faculty, Talbert co-directed (with Michael Maas) several National Endowment for the Humanities summer Institutes and Seminars at both UNC Chapel Hill and the American Academy in Rome. As visiting professor, Talbert taught at the University of Alabama, Huntsville (1993), at Princeton University (1997), and at Whitman College, WA (2021); also in Paris at the Ecole Pratique des Hautes Etudes (2011) and Ecole Normale Supérieure (2019), and at the Université de Reims (2013). He has been a resident professor at the American Academy in Rome (1991). He organized the 2007 Nebenzahl Lectures at the Newberry Library, Chicago, was 2017 Eitner lecturer (Stanford University), and lecturer for the Guangqi International Center, Shanghai, China (2018).

Talbert was the leading co-editor of the University of North Carolina Press series Studies in the History of Greece and Rome (1995-2017). As American Journal of Philology’s associate editor for ancient history, he co-edited two special issues: Classical Courts and Courtiers (2011), and Moses Finley in America (2014). He co-presented the virtual exhibition Late Ottoman Turkey in Princeton’s Forgotten Maps, 1883-1923 (2022-2023).

Talbert has served on the Council of the Classical Association of Canada, as president of the Association of Ancient Historians (1999-2002), and as chair of the American Academy in Rome’s School of Classical Studies Advisory Council (2006-2012). He has held a Guggenheim Fellowship, American Council of Learned Societies Senior Fellowship, Harley Research Fellowship, and Goheen Fellowship at the National Humanities Center. He was awarded the American Philological Association’s Medal for Distinguished Service in 1999. Cambridge conferred on him its Doctorate of Letters (2003), and he is a Corresponding Member of the German Archaeological Institute (2005). A Festschrift was presented to him in 2014.

Talbert has trained many ancient historians during his tenure at the University of North Carolina.

== Selected publications ==
=== Monographs and Related Contributions ===
- 1971. Studies on Timoleon and the revival of Greek Sicily from 344 to 317 B.C. (PhD dissertation, University of Cambridge. Faculty of Classics)
- 1974. Timoleon and the Revival of Greek Sicily (Cambridge University Press) ISBN 0521034132.
- 1984. The Senate of Imperial Rome (Princeton University Press). ISBN 9780691102382. 罗马帝国的元老院 / Luoma di guo de yuan lao yuan Chinese edition 2018 (Shanghai: East China Normal University Press) ISBN 9787567574786 issue review by Fergus Millar "The legislative voice" TLS 15 February 1985 p. 175-76
- 1988. trans. Plutarch on Sparta (Penguin Classics) ISBN 9780140449433. Expanded ed. 2005 ISBN 9780140449433.
- 1989. “The role of the helots in the class struggle at Sparta,” Historia 38: 22-40 The Role of the Helots in the Class Struggle at Sparta
- 1997. “The Greeks in Sicily and South Italy,” 137-65 in L.A. Tritle. ed., The Greek World in the Fourth Century (Routledge) ISBN 041510582X
- 1999. “Tacitus and the Senatus Consultum de Pisone Patre,” American Journal of Philology vol. 120.1: 89-97. Tacitus and the "Senatus Consultum de Cn. Pisone Patre"
- 2004. with M.T. Boatwright and D. Gargola. The Romans: From Village to Empire (Oxford University Press). ISBN 0195118758. BMCR 2006.04.29. Czech edition (2012). Dějiny římské rise: od nejranějších časů po Konstantina Velikého (Praha: Grada) ISBN 978-80-247-3168-1. Second English ed. (with Noel Lenski) 2012 ISBN 9780199730575
- 2006. with M.T. Boatwright and D. Gargola. A Brief History of the Romans (Oxford University Press). ISBN 9780195187151.
- 2009. “Senate, Roman,” 209-13 in S.N. Katz, ed., The Oxford International Encyclopedia of Legal History, vol. 5 ISBN 9780195134056
- 2010. Rome's World: The Peutinger Map Reconsidered (Cambridge University Press). ISBN 9780521764803; online content. BMCR 2012.04.14; TLS;JRA 24.831; Elijah Meeks.
- 2017. Roman Portable Sundials: The Empire in Your Hand. (Oxford University Press). ISBN 9780190273484
- 2019. Challenges of Mapping the Classical World (Routledge). ISBN 9781472457820
- 2022. with Brian Turner. trans. Pliny the Elder’s World: Natural History, Books 2-6 (Cambridge University Press) ISBN 9781108481755
- 2023. World and Hour in Roman Minds: Exploratory Essays (Oxford University Press). ISBN 9780197606360
- 2025. The Kieperts’ Asia Minor Ancient and Ottoman: Capstones of Route-Based Cartography (History of Classical Scholarship Supplementary Volume) ISBN 9781838001896

=== Festschrift ===
- 2014. L.L. Brice and Daniëlle Slootjes. Edd. Aspects of Ancient Institutions and Geography: Studies in Honor of Richard J.A. Talbert. Leiden: E. J. Brill. ISBN 9789004283718. (with cumulative bibliography, 12-25) Ancient History Bulletin 2015

=== Edited volumes ===
- 1985. Atlas of Classical History (Croom Helm, later Routledge). ISBN 9780029331101. Japanese edition 1996. Girishia rōma rekishi chizu ギリシア。ローマ歴史地図 / Richiādo·J·A·Tarubāto hen; Nonaka Natsumi, Oda Kenji yaku./リチァード·J·A·タルバート編; 野中夏実, 小田謙爾訳. 2023. with Lindsay Holman and Benet Salway. Atlas of Classical History Revised edition. Routledge ISBN 9781138785823
- 2000. Barrington Atlas of the Greek and Roman World and Map-by-Map Directory (Princeton University Press, 2000). ISBN 9780691031699. 2013 app version.
- 2004. with Kai Brodersen. Space in the Roman World, its Perception and Presentation (Münster: LIT). ISBN 9783825874193. BMCR 2005.09.41
- 2007. with David Buisseret and others, The Oxford Companion to World Exploration (Oxford University Press) ISBN 978019514922
- 2008. with R.W. Unger Cartography in Antiquity and the Middle Ages: Fresh Perspectives, New Methods (Leiden: Brill). ISBN 9789004166639. Reviews: BMCR 2009.06.07.
- 2010. with Kurt A. Raaflaub.Geography and Ethnography: Perceptions of the World in Pre-Modern Societies (Malden, MA: Wiley-Blackwell). ISBN 9781405191463.
- 2011. with David S. Potter. Classical Courts and Courtiers (American Journal of Philology vol. 132.1, special issue).
- 2012. with Susan E. Alcock and John P. Bodel. Highways, Byways, and Road Systems in the Pre-Modern World. (Malden, MA: Wiley-Blackwell). ISBN 9780470674253.
- 2012. Ancient Perspectives: Maps and Their Place in Mesopotamia, Egypt, Greece, and Rome. (University of Chicago Press). ISBN 9780226789378. Reviews: BMCR 2013.10.63; AJA 117.4
- 2014. with F. S. Naiden. Special Issue: Moses Finley in America: The Making of an Ancient Historian (American Journal of Philology vol. 135.2, special issue).
- 2017. with F.S. Naiden. Mercury's Wings: Exploring Modes of Communication in the Ancient World. (Oxford University Press). ISBN 9780195386844.

=== Maps ===
- 2011. ed. Routledge Wall Maps for the Ancient World (7 maps).
- ed. Maps for Texts series.

=== Internet resources ===
- 2012. "Maps" for Oxford Bibliographies Online: Classics.
- 2022-23. Late Ottoman Turkey in Princeton’s Forgotten Maps, 1883-1923 virtual exhibition
