= Beth Severy-Hoven =

Beth Severy-Hoven is Professor of the Classical Mediterranean and Middle East at Macalester College. She is an expert in Roman history and archaeology, and gender and sexuality in antiquity.

== Education ==
Severy-Hoven received her PhD from University of California, Berkeley, in 1998. Her doctoral thesis was entitled Reconceiving the Res Publica: Family and State at the Birth of the Roman Empire. She was awarded a MSt from the University of Oxford in 1991, and an AB from Bryn Mawr College in 1990.

== Career ==
Severy-Hoven has taught Latin, Greek, Roman history and archaeology at Macalester College for almost twenty years. She held the Lionel Pearson Fellowship awarded by the Society of Classical Studies, 1990–1991. She published her first monograph, Augustus and the Family at the Birth of the Roman Empire with Routledge in 2003. Beryl Rawson understood that the book "marks out its own terrain with a claim for uniqueness". Her Latin textbook, The Satyrica of Petronius: An Intermediate Reader won the first Ladislaus J. Bolchazy Pedagogy Book Award of the Classical Association of the Middle West and South (CAMWS). From 2014 to 2015, she was the Professor-in-Charge at the Intercollegiate Center for Classical Studies, Rome. In 2016, she was awarded the Jack and Marty Rossman Award for Excellence in Teaching.

== Bibliography ==
- Augustus and the Family at the Birth of the Roman Empire (New York: Routledge, 2008)
- 'Master Narratives and the Wall Painting of the House of the Vettii, Pompeii', Gender and History 2012, vol. 24 (3) 540-80
- The Satyrica of Petronius: An Intermediate Reader with Commentary and Guided Review (Norman: University of Oklahoma Press, 2014)
