= Seek and Hide =

2022 non-fiction book by Amy Gajda

- Author: Amy Gajda
- Subject: Right to privacy and freedom of the press
- Genre: Nonfiction
- Publisher: Viking Press
- Publication date: 2022
- Pages: 348
- ISBN: 978-1984880741

Seek and Hide: The Tangled History of the Right to Privacy is a nonfiction book by Amy Gajda, a Tulane University Law School professor. Published by Viking Press in 2022, Seek and Hide examines how the right to privacy has been viewed by the law and the public from the founding of the United States. A portion of the book was adapted for publication as an article in Wired.

== Summary ==
Seek and Hide begins with an introduction that discusses the case of Marion Manola, a comic opera actress involuntarily photographed in revealing tights, an incident that Gajda refers back to in the book. The introduction is followed by a primer that briefly explains the main types of U.S. law and how precedent works, as well as the role of Restatements of the Law, a series published by the American Law Institute. The concepts in the primer are key to understanding the arguments in the book.

Organized into three parts ("The Rise of Privacy", "The Rise of the Media", and "Watch Out!"), Seek and Hide explores the conflicts and tension between the rights established in the First Amendment (freedom of speech, freedom of the press) and the right to privacy, including the common law concept of "truthful libel". Seek and Hide explores how views toward the right of the public to be informed and the desire of individuals to maintain privacy change over time. It discusses how the 1890 law article by Samuel D. Warren II and Louis Brandeis, "The Right to Privacy", has influenced those views. Stories of specific events and individuals highlight how the balance between the right to privacy and the freedom of the press is constantly shifting.

== Reception ==
Writing in The Atlantic, historian Sarah E. Igo says of the book, "her account of the determined fight to protect privacy sounds like just the sort of road map we could use right now", noting the book's emphasis on the publication of true but personal information about people. In The New York Times, Jennifer Szalai calls the book "wry and fascinating" as well as "smart and empathetic", and says Gajda is "an insightful guide to a rich and textured history that gets easily caricatured, especially when a culture war is raging".

Kirkus Reviews recommends Seek and Hide for "lawyers, journalists, and others who must balance the right to make known with the right to conceal.". The verdict of the Library Journal was "A fascinating and thought-provoking analysis of the history of privacy issues that will be accessible to a general audience".
