= Peter Struck =

Peter Struck may refer to:

- Peter Struck (politician) (1943–2012)
- Peter Struck (classicist)
