= Susanna Elm =

German university teacher

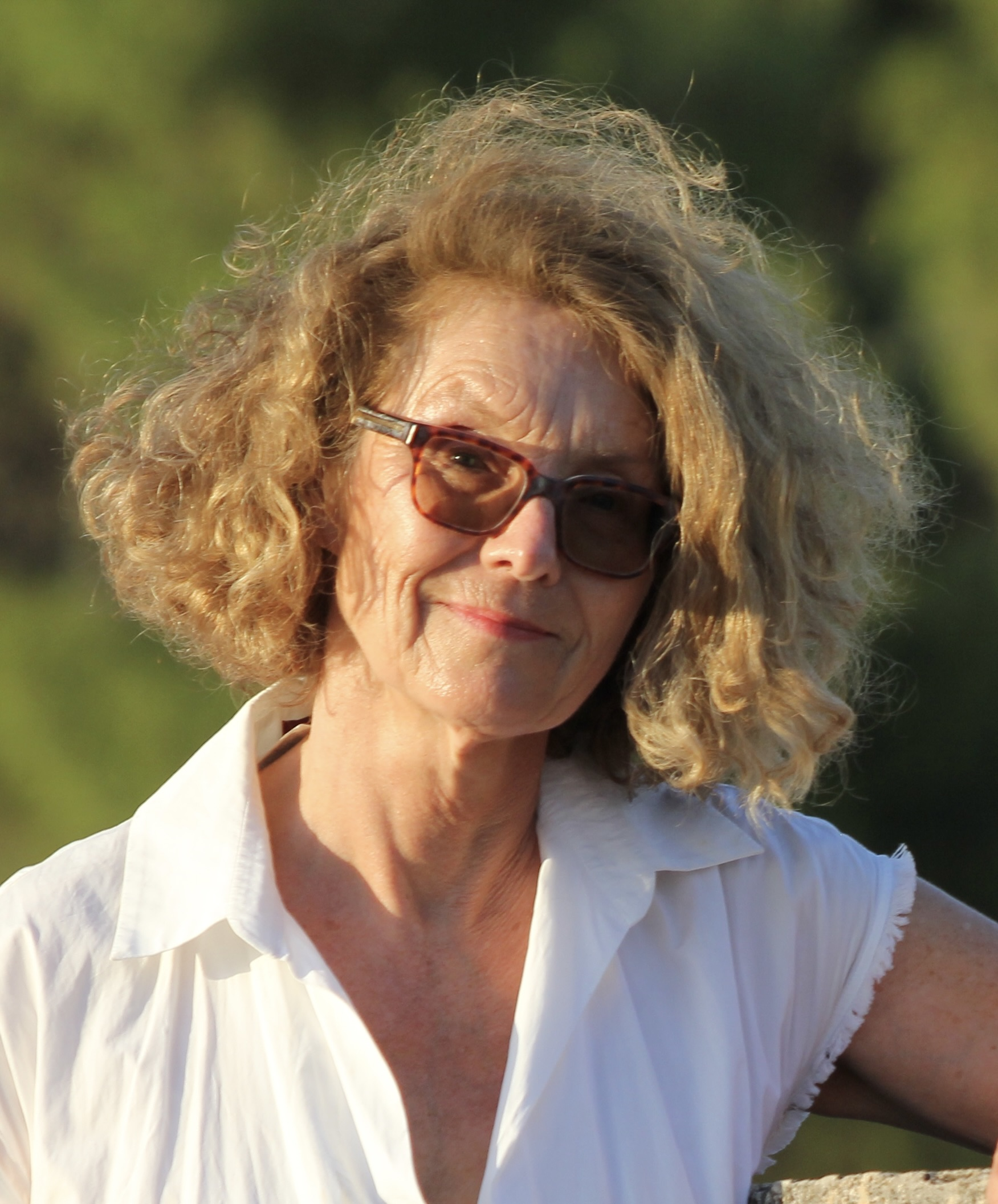
- Born: November 11, 1959 (age 66); Münster, West Germany
- Occupation: Historian

Academic background
- Education: Free University of Berlin, St Hilda's College, Oxford

Academic work
- Discipline: Classics
- Institutions: University of California, Berkeley

Susanna K. Elm (born November 11, 1959) is a German historian and classicist. She is the Sidney H. Ehrman Professor of European History at the Department of History at the University of California, Berkeley. Her research interests include the history of the later Roman Empire, late Antiquity and early Christianity. She is Associate Editor of the journals Church History and Studies in Late Antiquity, and she is a member of the editorial board for Classical Antiquity.

== Career ==
Susanna K. Elm is the daughter of historian Kaspar Elm. She graduated from the Gymnasium Leopoldinum in Detmold in 1978. Afterwards, she studied Classical Philology and History at Freie Universität Berlin. In 1986, she graduated from St Hilda's College, Oxford, where her doctoral thesis, The Organisation and Institutions of Female Asceticism in Fourth Century Cappadocia and Egypt, was supervised by classical historian, John F. Matthews.

Elm then worked as an analyst at Morgan Guaranty Trust for a year before becoming assistant professor at the University of California, Berkeley in 1989. In 1994, she became an associate professor. She has held a professorship at Berkeley since 2002.

In 2007, Elm was part of a University of California research team that won the American Philological Association (APA) Prize for Scholarly Outreach for creating middle-school course materials on the fall of the Roman Empire.

Her publications include Virgins of God: The Making of Asceticism in Late Antiquity (Clarendon, 1994/1996); Medical Challenges for the New Millennium: An Interdisciplinary Task (Kluver, 2001), co-edited with Stefan Willich; and Sons of Hellenism, Fathers of the Church (University of California, 2012). She has received a Rhodes Scholarship as well as fellowships from the Guggenheim Foundation (1995), the National Endowment for the Humanities, and the Wissenschaftskolleg zu Berlin.

The book Virgins of God was a development of her doctoral thesis about female asceticism in early Christianity. Enthusiastic religious women sought virtue by engaging in spiritual marriage or becoming anchoresses. Elm recounted how the religious hierarchy restrained such practises, condemning some of them as heresy. Doug Lee, writing in The Classical Review, praised the work as a "stimulating exposition which negotiates the complexities of the source material and subject matter with skill and assurance. ...one of the many strengths of the study is E's exploitation of little-known sources such as an anonymous treatise On Virginity (pp. 34–9 331–6) and Athanasius' Letter to the Virgins Who Went to Jerusalem (pp. 331–6)."

Her book, Sons of Hellenism, Fathers of the Church was described by the Bryn Mawr Classical Review as 'a welcome and erudite study of Gregory of Nazianzus's intellectual engagement with the emperor Julian.' In 2013, the APA awarded her the Charles J. Goodwin Award of Merit for the book.

In a 2016 interview for Studies in Late Antiquity, a journal which she edits, she described her writing and research as 'an integrated approach that combines written sources from authors that are Christian and non-Christian with documentary and material sources.'

Elm was elected a corresponding fellow of the British Academy in 2021.

Elm is married to Tübingen jurist and European law expert Martin Nettesheim.

== Selected publications ==
- 'Virgins of God': The Making of Asceticism in Late Antiquity. 1994. Oxford Classical Monographs. Oxford: Clarendon Press ISBN 9780198149200
- Sons of Hellenism, Fathers of the Church: Emperor Julian, Gregory of Nazianzus, and the Vision of Rome. 2012. Transformation of the Classical Heritage. Berkeley: University of California Press ISBN 9780520269309
- (Ed. with Stefan N Willich) Quo Vadis Medical Healing: Past Concepts and New Approaches. 2009. Springer ISBN 9781402089411
- (Ed. with Christopher M. Blunda) The Late (Wild) Augustine, Leiden: Brill/Schoeningh, 2020
- (Ed. with Christopher Ocker) Material Christianity, Springer Nature, 2020
- (Ed. with Silke-Petra Bergjan) Antioch: The Many Faces of Antioch: Intellectual Exchange and Religious Diversity (CE 350-450), COMES, Tübingen: Mohr-Siebeck, 2018.
- (Ed. with Barbara Vinken) Braut Christi: Familienformen in Europa im Spiegel der sponsa, München: W. Fink Verlag, 2016.
- The Importance of Being Gorgeous. Gender and Christian Imperial Rule in Late Antiquity (California: University of California Press, 2025) ISBN 9780520413344
