= Heinz Kähler =

German classical archaeologist

Heinz Kähler (21 January 1905 in Tetenbüll, Germany – 9 January 1974 in Cologne, Germany) was an ancient art historian and archaeologist.

Heinz Kähler studied classical archaeology and art history at the University of Freiburg. He studied under Hans Dragendorff (1870–1941) and completed his dissertation in 1929. Upon being granted a travel stipend from the Deutsches Archäologisches Institut, Kähler traveled from 1930 until 31 in France, Spain, Greece, Rome and Asia Minor. He returned to Germany, where he worked at the Pergamon Museum in Berlin (1936–1937). Afterwards, he was assistant to the Archaeological Seminar of Ernst Buschor at the Ludwig-Maximilians-Universität München (1937–1941) as well as in its museum of casts. His major study of the sculpture of the Great Pergamon Altar appeared in 1942. His professorial dissertation was completed there in 1943 while serving in the German army during World War II.

After the war, his study of Hadrian's villa at Tivoli appeared in 1950. He was appointed professor of classical archaeology at the Saarland University (1953–1960). His work on the Arch of Constantine in Rome (1953) and the Temple of Fortuna Primigenia of Praeneste (1958), both were completed at Saarland University. He co-founded with Jacques Moreau the Monumenta Artis Romanae series of publications, writing personally the volume on the statue of Augustus from Prima Porta (1959). In 1960, he succeeded Andreas Rumpf at the University of Cologne at the Institut für Klassische Archäologie. He would teach there until 1973. At the University of Cologne, he authored his major work, Rom und sein Imperium (1962), which was translated into English in 1963 and became a widely used text for Roman art. A second volume in the Monumenta Artis Romanae book series on the Gemma Augustea appeared in 1968. Among his many students was the Roman art historian Gerhard Koeppel.

== Publications ==
- habilitation: Die große Fries von Pergamon. Munich, 1942, published as Der große Fries von Pergamon: untersuchungen zur Kunstgeschichte und Geschichte Pergamons. Published Berlin, Gebr. Mann, 1948.
- Rom und sein Imperium. Baden-Baden: Holle, 1962. [English ed., The Art of Rome and her Empire. New York: Crown, 1963].
- Die Augustusstatue von Primaporta. Monumenta artis Romanae 1. Cologne: M. DuMont Schauberg, 1959.
- Der Fries vom Reiterdenkmal des Aemilius Paullus in Delphi. Monumenta artis Romanae 5. Berlin: Mann, 1965.
- Die frühe Kirche: Kult und Kultraum. Berlin: Mann, 1972.
- Das Griechische Metopenbild. Munich: Besher F. Bruckmann, 1949.
- Der griechische Tempel: Wesen und Gestalt. Berlin: G. Mann, 1964.
- Hadrian und seine Villa bei Tivoli. Berlin: Gebr. Mann, 1950.
- with Mango, Cyril. Die Hagia Sophia. Berlin: G. Mann, 1967 [English ed., Hagia Sophia. New York: Praeger, 1967].
- Lindos. Zurich: Raggi-Verlag, 1971.
- Pergamon. Berlin: Gebr. Mann, 1949.
- Die römischen Kapitelle des Rheingebietes. Berlin: W. de Gruyter, 1939.
- Die spätantiken Bauten unter dem Dom von Aquileia und ihre Stellung innerhalb der Geschichte des frühchristlichen Kirchenbaues. Saarbrücken: Universität Saarbrücken, 1957.
- Zwei sockel eines triumphbogens im Boboligarten zu Florenz. Berlin: Leipzig, W. de Gruyter, 1936.
- Die Gebälke des Konstantinsbegens. vol. 2 of Toebelmann, Fritz. Römische Gebälke. Heildeberg: Carl Winter, 1953.
- and Voit, Ludwig, and Bengl, Hans. Römisches Erbe: ein Lesebuch lateinischer Literatur. Munich: Bayerischer Schulbuch-Verlag, 1950.
