= Kristina Milnor =

American historian and classical scholar

Kristina Milnor is a professor of Classics in the Department of Classics and Ancient Studies at Barnard College, Columbia University. She specialises in Latin literature, Roman history, feminist theory, and gender studies.

== Education ==
Milnor graduated with an undergraduate degree in Classical Studies at Wesleyan University in 1992. She received her PhD from the University of Michigan in 1998. Her doctoral thesis was Suis omnia tuta locis: Women, Place, and Public Life in the Age of Augustus. In 1997, she also obtained a Graduate Certificate from the University of Michigan in Women's Studies.

== Career ==
Milnor joined the faculty at Barnard in 1998. Her first book, Gender, Domesticity, and the Age of Augustus: Inventing Private Life, was published by Oxford University Press in 2005. It won the Goodwin Award of Merit from the American Philological Association in 2006. Milnor received a Frederick Burkhardt Fellowship funded by The American Council of Learned Societies at the Institute for Advanced Study in Princeton, New Jersey, 2008–9. Her second book, Graffiti and the Literary Landscape of Roman Pompeii, was published by Oxford University Press in 2014. This was credited with 'clarity, measured scholarship, and critical rigour' in reviews.

Milnor has held significant fellowships at the American Academy in Rome ((2003 – 4) and the Institute for Advanced Study in Princeton (2008 – 9). Although she was not credited as the historical consultant, in 2003, Milnor also worked with executive producers and directors of HBO's Rome, advising on the "reality" of ancient Roman life during the show's early production. She has also published Classical reception studies, including the use of material objects in films and TV based on the classics and Barbie's classical associations.

== Bibliography ==
- Graffiti and the Literary Landscape of Roman Pompeii (Oxford; Oxford University Press, 2014)
- 'Women in Roman Society', The Oxford Handbook of Social Relations in the Roman World, ed. by Michael Peachin (Oxford University Press; 2011) 609-22
- 'Women, The Oxford Handbook of Roman Studies, ed. by Alessandro Barchiesi and Walter Scheidel (Oxford University Press, 2010) 815-26
- 'Literary Literacy in Roman Pompeii: The Case of Vergil's Aeneid', William A. Johnson and Holt N. Parker, Ancient Literacies: The Culture of Reading in Greece and Rome (Oxford: Oxford University Press, 2009)
- The Cambridge Companion to the Roman Historians, ed. by Andrew Feldherr, 'Women in Roman Historiograhy', (Cambridge: Cambridge University Press, 2009)
- Gender, Domesticity, and the Age of Augustus: Inventing Private Life (Oxford: Oxford University Press, 2008)
- 'Livy, Augustus, and the Landscape of the Law', Arethusa 40.1 (2007)
