= Joseph Purtill =

American politician (died 2014)

Member of the Connecticut House of Representatives from Stonington
- In office 1959–1963
- Preceded by: Malcolm D. Perry; James H. Allyn
- Succeeded by: Howard E. Crouch; Mary H. Boatwright

Personal details
- Born: 1927 or 1928 Westerly, Rhode Island, U.S.
- Died: March 25, 2014 (aged 86) Mystic, Connecticut, U.S.
- Party: Democratic
- Spouse: Katherine Donovan Purtill
- Children: 4
- Education: Saint Michael's College; University of Connecticut School of Law

Joseph James Purtill Sr. (1927 or 1928 – March 25, 2014) was an American jurist, lawyer, and politician from Connecticut.

== Personal life and education ==
Purtill was born in Westerly, Rhode Island, to Joseph and Marion Purtill. He served in the United States Navy and United States Marine Corps. Purtill received his bachelor's degree from Saint Michael's College in Vermont and his law degree from the University of Connecticut School of Law. Purtill was admitted to the Connecticut bar and operated a private law practice from 1958 to 1979. He was married to Katherine Donovan Purtill and had four children.

== Career ==
Purtill served as the Stonington, Connecticut Town Clerk from 1963 to 1979. From 1959 to 1963, he served in the Connecticut House of Representatives, representing Stonington as a Democrat. In 1979, Purtill was appointed to the Connecticut Superior Court by Governor Ella Grasso.

== Death ==
Purtill died on March 25, 2014, in Mystic, Connecticut. He was 86.
