= Gerhard Koeppel =

American classical scholar

Prof. Gerhard M. Koeppel
- Born: October 30, 1936 (age 90); Nuremberg, Germany
- Died: December 20, 2012 (aged 76); Erlangen, Germany
- Citizenship: United States of America
- Occupations: Classical archaeologist and art historian
- Known for: Roman relief sculpture

Academic background
- Education: University of Cologne
- Doctoral advisor: Heinz Kahler

Academic work
- Discipline: Classicist
- Institutions: The University of North Carolina at Chapel Hill
- Main interests: Roman art, sculpture, and painting

Gerhard M. Koeppel (October 30, 1936, in Nuremberg, Germany – December 20, 2012 in Erlangen, Germany) was a German-born historian of Roman art and a specialist in the study of Roman historical relief sculpture. Koeppel studied at the University of Cologne and under the ancient art historian Heinz Kähler. Gerhard Koeppel was a member of the Archaeological Institute of America, the Classical Society of the American Academy in Rome, the Deutscher Archäologenverband, and Corresponding Member of the Deutsches Archaeologisches Institut. He was Resident Scholar at the American Academy in Rome (1974–1975), Professor-in-Charge of the Intercollegiate Center for Classical Studies in Rome (1980–1981, 1989–1990, spring 1998), and Director of the American Academy Summer School (1986–1988). He joined the faculty of Classics at the University of North Carolina at Chapel Hill in 1969 and was professor emeritus at the time of his death.

Koeppel's scholarly work focused on the development of the iconography of Roman historical relief sculpture, with particular interest in state panel reliefs and monuments such as the Column of Trajan. A series of studies of Roman state art appeared in the pages of the Bonner Jahrbücher beginning in 1969. His inquiries focused not only on iconography and its intricacies but also the narrative technique of the Roman artist. He also co-authored a volume on Roman souvenirs and the material culture of ancient tourism.

A photograph of him dressed as the Flamen Dialis was published in The World of Roman Costume.

== Publications ==
=== Books ===
1. Künzl, Ernst and Gerhard Koeppel. 2002. Souvenirs und Devotionalien : Zeugnisse des geschäftlichen, religiösen und kulturellen Tourismus im antiken Römerreich. Mainz: P. von Zabern. ISBN 9783805328487.

=== Articles ===
1. 1969. "Profectio und Adventus", Bonner Jahrbücher 169:130-194.
2. 1972. "A Roman Terracotta Cantharus with Battle Scenes in Mainz," Bonner Jahrbücher19:188-201.
3. 1980. "A Military Itinerarium on the Column of Trajan: Scene L", Römische Mitteilungen 87:301-306.
4. 1980. "Fragments from a Domitianic Monument in Ann Arbor and Rome" Bulletin of the Museums of Art and Archaeology, the University of Michigan 3:14-29.
5. 1982. "Die 'Ara Pietatis Augustae': ein Geisterbau", Mitteilungen des Deutschen Archäologischen Instituts, Römische Abteilung 89:453-455.
6. 1982. "Official State Reliefs of the City of Rome in the Imperial Age: A Bibliography." Aufstieg und Niedergang der römischen Welt II.12.1, 477-506. Table of Contents
7. 1982. "The Grand Pictorial Tradition of Roman Historical Representation during the Early Empire." Aufstieg und Niedergang der römischen Welt II.12.1, 507-535. Table of Contents
8. 1983. "Two Reliefs from the Arch of Claudius in Rome", Mitteilungen des Deutschen Archäologischen Instituts, Römische Abteilung 90:103-109.
9. 1983. "Die historichen Reliefs der römischen Kaiserzeit I: Stadtrömische Denkmäler unbekannter Bauzugehörigkeit aus augusteischer und julisch-claudischer Zeit," Bonner Jahrbücher 183:61-144.
10. 1984. "Die historischen Reliefs der römischen Kaiserzeit II: Stadtrömische Denkmäler unbekannter Bauzugehörigkeit aus flavischer Zeit," Bonner Jahrbücher 184:1-65.
11. 1985. "Die historischen Reliefs der römischen Kaiserzeit III: Stadtrömische Denkmäler unbekannter Bauzugehörigkeit aus trajanischer Zeit," Bonner Jahrbücher 185:143-213.
12. 1985. "Maximus Videtur Rex. The collegium pontificum on the Ara Pacis Augustae", Archaeological News 14:17-22.
13. 1985. "The Role of Pictorial Models in the Creation of the Historical Relief during the Age of Augustus," in The Age of Augustus, edited by R. Winkes, 89-106. Providence, R.I.: Center for Old World Archaeology and Art, Brown University; Louvain-La-Neuve, Belgium : Institut Supérieur d'Archéologie de d'Histoire de l'Art, Collège Érasme.
14. 1986. "Die historischen Reliefs der römischen Kaiserzeit IV: Stadtrömische Denkmäler unbekannter Bauzugehörigkeit aus hadrianischer bis konstantinischer Zeit," Bonner Jahrbücher 186:1-90.
15. 1987. "Die historischen Reliefs der römischen Kaiserzeit, V. Ara Pacis Augustae, 1. ," Bonner Jahrbücher 187:101-57.
16. 1989. "Die historischen Reliefs der römischen Kaiserzeit VI: Reliefs von bekannten Bauten der augusteischen bis antoninischen Zeit," Bonner Jahrbücher 189:17-71.
17. 1990. "Die historischen Reliefs der römischen Kaiserzeit VII: Der Bogen des Septimius Severus, die Decennalienbasis und der Konstantinsbogen," Bonner Jahrbücher 190:1-64.
18. 1991. "Die historischen Reliefs der römischen Kaiserzeit VIII. Der Fries der Trajanssäule in Rom, Teil 1: Der Erste Dakische Krieg, Szenen I-LXXVIII" Bonner Jahrbücher 191:135-198.
19. 1992. "Die historischen Reliefs der römischen Kaiserzeit IX. Der Fries der Trajanssäule in Rom, Teil 2: Der Zweite Dakische Krieg, Szenen LXXIX-CLV," Bonner Jahrbücher 192:61-122.
20. 2002. "The Column of Trajan: Narrative Technique and the Image of the Emperor." In Sage and emperor : Plutarch, Greek intellectuals, and Roman power in the time of Trajan, 98-117 A.D., edited by P. A. Stadter and L Van der Stockt, 245-58. Leuven: Leuven University Press. ISBN 9789058672391.

=== Reviews ===
1. 1968. Review of Ägäis und Orient. Die überseeischen Kulturbeziehungen von Kreta und Mykenai mit Ägypten, der Levante und Kleinasien unter besonderer Berücksichtigung des 2. Jahrtausends v.Chr. by Friedrich Schachermeyr. Bonner Jahrbücher 168:527-32.
2. 1970. Review of Victoria Romana. Archäologische Untersuchungen zur Geschichte und Wesensart der römischen Siegesgöttin von den Anfängen bis zum Ende des 3. Jhs. n.Chr. by Tonio Hölscher. Bonner Jahrbücher 170:538-41
3. 1971. Review of Studien zur statuarischen Darstellung der römischen Kaiser by Hans Georg Niemeyer. American Journal of Archaeology 75.2:229-230.
4. 1977. Review of Roman art by Donald Strong. Art Journal 36.4:354-6.
5. 1977. Review of Roman Art from the Republic to Constantine by Richard Brilliant. The Art Bulletin 59.2:268-9.
6. 1979. Review of Untersuchungen zur Trajanssäule. Erster Teil: Darstellungsprogramm und künstlerischer Entwurf by Werner Gauer. American Journal of Archaeology 83.3:368-369.
7. 1992. "The Third Man: Restoration Problems on the North Frieze of the Ara Pacis Augustae." Journal of Roman Archaeology 5:216-18.
8. 1996. Review of Dono Hartwig. Originali ricongiunti e copie tra Roma e Ann Arbor, by R. Paris. Journal of Roman Archaeology 9:386-8.
9. 1999. Review of Teile eines historischen Frieses in der Casa de pilatos in Sevilla. Mit einem Exkurs zur Tensa by Sabine G Szidat. Journal of Roman Archaeology 12:596-599.

== Students ==
- 1977. Woodruff, Sandria Ewers. The pictorial traditions of the battle scenes on the monument of the Julii at St. Rémy. Ph.D., Department of Classics, The University of North Carolina at Chapel Hill.
- 1978. Mace, Hugh Lockwood. The Archaic Ionic Capital: Studies in Formal and Stylistic Development. Ph.D., Department of Classics, University of North Carolina at Chapel Hill.
- 1979. Mason, Richard S. Architectural Problems at the Argive Heraion: The Northeast Building and Neighboring Structures. Ph.D., Department of Classics, The University of North Carolina at Chapel Hill.
- 1980. Gigante, Linda Maria. A Study of Perspectives from the Representations of Architectural Forms in Greek Classical and Hellenistic Painting. Ph.D., Department of Classics, The University of North Carolina at Chapel Hill.
- 1981. Constantinople, George. R. The Development of Trajan’s Political Program in the Coin Reverses of the Roman Mint. Ph.D., Department of Classics, The University of North Carolina at Chapel Hill.
- 1988. Jones, Janet Duncan. The so-called Vicomagistri Relief in the Vatican Museum. Ph.D., Department of Classics, The University of North Carolina at Chapel Hill.
- 1995. McDaniel, Mary Joann. Augustus, the Vestals, and the signum imperii. Ph.D., Department of Classics, The University of North Carolina at Chapel Hill.
- 2000. Gregg, Christopher A. Homoerotic objectification in Roman art: the legacy of Ganymede. Ph.D., Department of Classics, The University of North Carolina at Chapel Hill.
