= John E. Stambaugh =

American classical scholar

John Evan Stambaugh (August 24, 1939, in Harrisburg, Pennsylvania – June 6, 1990, in Williamstown, Massachusetts) was an American classical scholar and professor at Williams College.

Stambaugh was educated at Trinity College and then at Princeton University, earning a Ph.D. in 1967. Stambaugh taught at Williams from 1965 until 1990 and was a specialist in the field of Greco-Roman religion as well as early Christianity. In addition to teaching at Williams, Stambaugh was a fellow of the American School of Classical Studies in Athens, Greece. and a faculty and managing committee member and chair of the Intercollegiate Center for Classical Studies in Rome, Italy.

== Publications ==
=== Books ===
- 1972. Serapis under the early Ptolemies. Leiden: E. J. Brill.
- 1988. The ancient Roman city. Baltimore: Johns Hopkins University Press. ISBN 9780801836923

=== Articles ===
- 1978. "The Functions of Roman Temples." In Religion (Heidentum: Römische Religion, Allgemeines) ANRW II.16.1, edited by Wolfgang Haase, 554–608. Berlin: Walter De Gruyter.

== Biography ==
- Fuqua, C. 1994. "Stambaugh, John Evan." In Biographical dictionary of North American classicists, edited by W. Briggs, 609–10. Westport, Conn. : Greenwood Press. ISBN 9780313245602
