= John J. Winkler =

American classical philologist

John Jack Winkler (11 August 1943 in St. Louis – 26 April 1990 in Stanford, California) was an American philologist and Benedictine monk.

Winkler studied classical studies at Saint Louis University from 1960 to 1963 and then went to England, where he joined a Benedictine order. In 1966 he returned to the United States and taught at Saint Louis Priory School until 1970. In 1970, he left the Benedictines and participated in a graduate program in Ancient Philology at the University of Texas, Austin. In 1974 he graduated with the thesis In Pursuit of Nymphs: Comedy and Sex in Nonnos' "Tales of Dionysos". He then served as assistant professor at Yale University. In 1979 Winkler was appointed to a professorship at Stanford University. He taught there until his death from AIDS at the age of 46.

In his research, Winkler dealt with the social functions of Attic dramas and the portrayal of sexual conventions and gender roles in ancient Greece. His book The Constraints of Desire reached many readers outside the academic world. He donated half of the book's income to the San Francisco AIDS Foundation. At his behest, a gay and lesbian working group was established at the US Association of Ancient Philologists. After his death, the John J. Winkler Memorial Trust was founded in his memory, which awards the John J. Winkler Memorial Prize. Winkler's last book,Rehearsals of Manhood: Athenian Drama as Social Practice (2023) was edited by David Halperin and Kirk Ormand and published posthumously.

He was criticised by Camille Paglia in her essay "Junk Bonds and Corporate Raiders: Academe in the Hour of the Wolf".

== Books ==
Single-authored books

- Rehearsals of Manhood: Athenian Drama as Social Practice (2023)
- The Constraints of Desire: The Anthropology of Sex and Gender in Ancient Greece (1990)
- Auctor and Actor: A Narratological Reading of Apuleius's 'The Golden Ass' (1985)

Co-edited volumes

- Nothing to do with Dionysos? Athenian Drama in Its Social Context. (1990)

== Awards ==
- Goodwin Award of Merit (1989) from the American Philological Association
