= Raffaella Cribiore =

Italian hellenist and papyrologist (1948–2023)

Raffaella Razzini Cribiore (March 27, 1948 – July 13, 2023) was professor of Classics at New York University. She specialised in papyrology, ancient education, ancient Greek rhetoric and the Second Sophistic.

== Early life and education ==
Raffaella Razzini was born in Varese, Italy, the daughter of Mario and Stefania Razzini. She received her BA from Università Cattolica del Sacro Cuore in 1972, and her PhD from the Department of Classics at Columbia University in 1993. Her doctoral thesis was entitled Writing, Teachers and Students in Graeco-Roman Egypt.

== Career ==
Cribiore was curator of the Papyri, Rare Book and Manuscripts Library at Columbia University, and served as Professor of Classics at New York University from 2008 until her death. Cribiore wrote extensively on ancient literacy and education in Hellenistic and Roman Egypt. Her work, Gymnastics of the Mind: Greek Education in Hellenistic and Roman Egypt, won the Charles J. Goodwin Award of Merit in 2004. She also published extensively on the work of the rhetorician Libanius and his influence on the Second Sophistic. The Society for Classical Studies presents the Raffaella Cribiore Award for Outstanding Literary Translation in her honor.

== Selected publications ==
- Writing, Teachers, and Students in Graeco-Roman Egypt (Atlanta, 1996)
- Gymnastics of the Mind: Greek Education in Hellenistic and Roman Egypt (Princeton: Princeton University Press, 2001)
- (with Roger Bagnall) Women’s Letters from Ancient Egypt 300 BC-AD 800 (Michigan: Ann Arbor, 2006)
- The School of Libanius in Late Antique Antioch (Princeton: Princeton University Press, 2007)
- Martina’s Town (New York: Legas Press, 2010)
- Libanius the Sophist: Rhetoric, Reality and Religion in the Fourth Century (Ithaca: Cornell University Press, 2013)
- (with Roger S. Bagnall, Nicola Aravecchia, Paola Davoli, Olaf E. Kaper, and Susanna McFadden) An Oasis City (New York: New York University Press, 2015)
- Between City and School: Selected Orations of Libanius (Liverpool: Liverpool University Press, 2016)

== Personal life ==
Cribiore had two children. She died by drowning at Finale Ligure in 2023, at the age of 75.
