= Judith P. Hallett =

American classicist

Professor Judith P. Hallett

Academic background
- Education: Harvard University

Academic work
- Discipline: Classics
- Sub-discipline: Latin; Classical reception studies
- Institutions: University of London; University of Maryland

Judith P. Hallett is Professor and Distinguished Scholar-Teacher Emerita of Classics, having formerly been the Graduate Director at the Department of Classics, University of Maryland. Her research focuses on women, the family, and sexuality in ancient Greece and Rome, particularly in Latin literature. She is also an expert on classical education and reception in the nineteenth and twentieth centuries.

== Biography ==
Hallett received a BA from Wellesley College and an MA and PhD from Harvard University (1971).

While at Harvard, she studied at the American Academy in Rome. Later on, she spent a year at the Institute of Classical Studies at the University of London. She was elected to the American Philological Association Board of Directors for 1997–1999, and appointed the Vice-President of that Association's Division of Outreach in 1999. She was president of the Classical Association of the Atlantic States in 2000. From 2000 to 2009, she coordinated the CAAS meetings. She was also elected the APA Vice-President for Outreach for 2008–2011. She was a member of the Maryland Humanities Council from 2001 to 2011. From 2002 to 2009 she was a member of the Board of Trustees of the Baltimore Hebrew University, and in 2010 she was appointed to the board of directors of the Thornton Wilder Society. She was also elected president for 2013–2015 of the Gamma of Maryland Chapter of Phi Beta Kappa.

She has participated in several TV shows as an expert guest. From 1986 until 1994 she appeared on the Canadian radio show The Court of Ideas. She was interviewed by Sander Vanocur for the History Channel/A&E series Movies in Time. For the same channels, she was part of a segment for the Valentine's Special on the five greatest love affairs of history and their series The History of Sex (1999). In 2001, she was a consultant for the PBS series The Roman Empire in the First Century, making an appearance on every episode aired.

Hallett is also a founding co-editor of the journal EuGesTa (Journal of Gender Studies in Antiquity).

== Honors ==
Hallett has been honored by the publishing of a festschrift (a celebratory collection of articles) for her contributions to the study of Roman literature and culture. The title of the festschrift is Roman Literature, Gender and Reception: Domina Illustris. She also received the Lambda Classical Caucus (LCC) Activism Award for the year 2015. This award is given to members who have promoted the rights and well-being of sexual minorities beyond the usual academic activities. She was the Suzanne Deal Booth Scholar-in-Residence at the Intercollegiate Center for Classical Studies in Rome for 2017–2018. In March 2018, she was awarded the Lifetime Achievement Award from Eta Sigma Phi, the citation drawing attention not only to her research and teaching but also to her 'stalwart service for the profession'. In April 2018, a one-day international colloquium on women and classical scholarship was held at the University of Maryland to honor her retirement. In 2023 she, along with her co-editors Bartolo Natoli and Angela Pitts, won the Bolchazy-Carducci Pedagogy Award for the book Ancient Women Writers of Greece and Rome.

Throughout her career, Hallett authored (and co-authored) many ovationes (celebratory speeches written in Latin) of her fellow classical scholars. These Latin compositions were usually delivered at annual meetings of notable organizations within Classical Studies, such as the Classical Association of the Atlantic States.

In 1992 she received a Distinguished Scholar-Teacher Award at the University of Maryland.

== Select bibliography ==
=== Books ===
- Fathers and Daughters in Roman Society: Women and the Elite Family. Princeton, 1984.
- Compromising Traditions: The Personal Voice in Classical Scholarship. Co-edited with Thomas VanNortwick. Routledge, 1996.
- Roman Sexualities. Co-edited with Marilyn Skinner. Princeton, 1997.
- Rome and her Monuments: Essays on the City and Literature of Rome in Honor of Katherine Geffcken. Co-edited with Sheila K. Dickison. Bolchazy-Carducci, 2000.
- British Classics Beyond England. Co-edited with Christopher Stray. Baylor University Press, 2008.
- A Roman Women Reader: Selections from the Second Century BCE through the Second Century CE. Co-authored with Sheila K. Dickison. Bolchazy-Carducci, 2015.
- Kinesis: Essays for Donald Lateiner on the Ancient Depiction of Gesture, Motion and Emotion. Co-edited with Christina Clark and Edith Foster. University of Michigan Press, 2015.
- Ancient Women Writers of Greece and Rome. Co-edited with Bartolo Natoli and Angela Pitts. Routledge, 2022.

=== Articles and book chapters ===
- “The Role of Women in Roman Elegy: Counter-Cultural Feminism,” Arethusa 6.1 (1973), 103-124. Reprinted in Women in the Ancient World: The Arethusa Papers, ed. John Peradotto and J. P Sullivan (Albany 1984) and Latin Erotic Elegy: An Anthology and Reader, ed. Paul Allen Miller (London and New York 2002),.
- “Perusinae glandes and the changing image of Augustus,” American Journal of Ancient History 2 (1977), 151-171.
- “Sappho and her Social Context: Sense and Sensuality,” Signs. Journal of Women in Culture and Society 4 (1979), 447-464. Reprinted in Classical and Medieval Literature, ed. Julia O. Krstovic (Detroit, New York, Fort Lauderdale, London 1989), and in Re-reading Sappho: A Collection of Critical Essays, ed. Ellen Greene (Berkeley and Los Angeles 1997), Vol. 2.
- “Women as ‘Same’ and ‘Other’ in the Classical Roman Elite,” Helios 16.1 (1989), 59-78.
- “Female Homoeroticism and the Denial of Roman Reality in Latin Literature,” Yale Journal of Criticism 3.1 (1989), 209-332. Reprinted in Homosexuality in the Ancient World, ed. R. Dynes and Stephen Donaldson (New York and London 1992)), and in Roman Sexualities.
- “The Political Backdrop of Plautus' Casina,“ in Transitions to Empire: Essays in Greco-Roman History 360-146 BC, in Honor of E. Badian, ed. E. Harris and R. Wallace. University of Oklahoma Press, 1996. 409-438.
- Special issue of Classical World co-edited with William M. Calder III, 'Six North American Women Classicists' (1996–97).
- “Sulpicia and the Valerii: Family Ties and Poetic Unity”, in Noctes Atticae: Articles on Greco-Roman Antiquity and Its Nachleben, Presented to Jorgen Mejer on his 60th Birthday, ed. Henrik Fich, Gorm Tortzen, Pernille Flensted-Jensen, Adam Schwartz and Thomas Heine. Museum Tusculanum Press, University of Copenhagen, 2002. 141-149.
- “Roman Mothers,” a special issue of the classical journal Helios 33.2 (2006). Editor and author of “Introduction: Cornelia and her Maternal Legacy,” 119-147, and “Fulvia, mother of Iullus Antonius,” 149-164.
- “Corpus Erat: Sulpicia’s Elegiac Text and Body in Ovid’s Pygmalion Narrative (Metamorphoses 10.238-297)”, in Bodies and Boundaries in Graeco-Roman Antiquity, ed. Thorsten Foegen and Mireille Lee. De Gruyter, 2009. 111-124.
- “Ovid’s Sappho and Roman Women Latin Poets,” Dictynna 4 (2009).
- “Recovering Sulpicia: the value and limitations of prosopography and intertextuality,” Receptions of Antiquity, ed. J. Nelis. Ghent, 2011. 297-311.
- “Scenarios of Sulpiciae: Moral Discourses and Immoral Verses,” EuGeStA 1 (2011). 79-96.
- “Anxiety and Influence: Ovid’s Amores 3.7 and Encolpius’ Impotence in Satyricon 126 ff.” In Narrating Desire: Eros, Sex and Gender in the Ancient Novel, edited by Marilia Futre-Pinheiro, Marilyn Skinner and Froma Zeitlin. Berlin and New York, 2012. 209-220.
- Contribution to the Blackwell Companion to Women in the Ancient World (Wiley-Blackwell, 2012) with Eva Stehle.
- “Sexualizing the Puella in Latin Comedy, Lyric and Elegy, “ EuGeStA 3 (2013) 195-208.
- "Roman Elegy and the Roman Novel", co-authored with Judith Hindermann. A Companion to the Ancient Novel (Wiley-Blackwell, 2014).
- "Omnia Movet Amor: Love and Resistance, Art and Movement in Ovid's Daphne and Apollo Episode (Metamorphoses 1.452-567)." Kinesis: The Ancient Depiction of Gesture, Motion, and Emotion. University of Michigan Press, 2015.
- "Raising the Iron Curtain, Crossing the Pond: Transformative Interactions Among North American and Eastern European Classicists since 1945" with Dorota Dutsch. Classics and Class: Greek and Latin Classics and Communism at School (2016).
- "Greek (and Roman) Ways and Thoroughfares: the Routing of Edith Hamilton's Classical Antiquity" and "Eli's Daughters: Female Classics Graduate Students at Yale, 1892-1941", in Women Classical Scholars: Unsealing the Fountain from the Renaissance to Jacqueline de Romily (Oxford University Press, 2016).
- 'Gender and the Classical Diaspora', Classical Scholarship and Its History: From the Renaissance to the Present. Essays in Honour of Christopher Stray, edited by Stephen Harrison and Christopher Pelling (Berlin, Boston: De Gruyter, 2021) pp. 301–318
