= Sarah E. Igo =

American historian and author

- Born: 1969 (age 56–57)
- Spouse: Ole Molvig
- Awards: Merle Curti Award; Ralph Waldo Emerson Award

Academic background
- Education: B.A., Social Studies, Harvard University; M.A., PhD, History, 2001, Princeton University
- Thesis: America surveyed: the making of a social scientific public, 1920-1960 (2001)

Academic work
- Institutions: University of Pennsylvania; Vanderbilt University

Sarah Elizabeth Igo (born 1969) is an American historian and author. She is the Andrew Jackson Chair in American History at Vanderbilt University.

== Early life and education ==
Igo was born in 1969. She earned her Bachelor of Arts degree in social studies from Harvard University and her PhD in history from Princeton University. During her post-secondary school education at Harvard and Princeton, Igo was the recipient of numerous fellowships including the Woodrow Wilson Fellowship and Whiting Foundation in the Humanities Dissertation Fellowship.

== Career ==
Upon earning her PhD, Igo joined the department of history at the University of Pennsylvania as an assistant professor of history. During her tenure at the university, she received the 2004 American Council of Learned Societies Andrew W. Mellon Foundation Junior Faculty Fellowship to research her first book. Igo eventually published her first book in 2007 titled The Averaged American: Surveys, Citizens, and the Making of a Mass Public. She republished her dissertation into a social sciences book focused on how the increasing use of surveys, polls and other forms of statistical measurements have shaped American society. For her efforts, she received the 2007 President's Book Award, which "rewards an especially meritorious first work by a beginning scholar and is judged on the criteria of scholarly significance, interdisciplinary reach and past structures and events and change over time." She also won the Cheiron Book Prize and was named a finalist for the C. Wright Mills Award from the American Sociological Association. Prior to leaving the University of Pennsylvania, she co-founded the National Forum on the Future of Liberal Education with Peter Struck.

In 2008, Igo left the University of Pennsylvania to become an associate professor of history at Vanderbilt University, where her husband also worked. Upon joining Vanderbilt, Igo began working on her second book The Known Citizen: A History of Privacy in Modern America. In order to write her book, she received a Short Term Visiting Scholarship from the Max Planck Institute for the History of Science and the New Directions Fellowship from the Andrew W. Mellon Foundation. After years of research, Igo published The Known Citizen: A History of Privacy in Modern America in 2018, which focused on why and how privacy became a concern to American citizens. It went on to win the 2019 American Philosophical Society's Jacques Barzun Prize in Cultural History, the Merle Curti Intellectual History Award, the Ralph Waldo Emerson Award and the Chancellor's Award for Research. In the same year, Igo was appointed to the residential faculty of E. Bronson Ingram College to "help expand the student learning experience beyond the classroom" and the Committee on Enhancing Faculty Voices in the Public Sphere.

On September 20, 2019, Igo was promoted to the Andrew Jackson Endowed Chair in American History.

== Personal life ==
Igo and her husband, historian Ole Molvig, have three daughters together.
