= Mary H. Boatwright =

American politician (1920–2002)

Member of the Connecticut House of Representatives from Stonington
- In office 1963–1967 Serving with Howard E. Crouch
- Preceded by: Howard E. Crouch; Joseph Purtill
- Succeeded by: Seat eliminated

Personal details
- Born: Mary Douglas Howard; April 8, 1920 Houston, Texas, U.S.
- Died: May 31, 2002 (aged 82)
- Party: Republican
- Spouse: Victor Taliaferro Boatwright (m. 1948; died 1998)
- Children: 4, including Mary T. Boatwright
- Education: Trinity College

Mary H. "Billy" Boatwright (April 8, 1920 – May 31, 2002) was an American politician who served in the Connecticut House of Representatives from 1963 to 1967, representing the town of Stonington as a Republican.

== Personal life ==
Mary Douglas Howard was born on April 8, 1920, in Houston, Texas. She graduated from Trinity College in Hartford, Connecticut. She married Victor Taliaferro Boatwright in 1948, and they were married until his death in 1998. They had four children: Mary Dorsey, twin boys John and William, and Mary Taliaferro, a professor emerita of classical studies at Duke University.

== Political career ==
A Republican, Boatwright was elected to the Connecticut House of Representatives in 1962 and served until 1967, representing the town of Stonington alongside fellow Republican Howard E. Crouch. Boatwright did not run for reelection in 1966 and had no successor, as Connecticut's 1965 redistricting ended the use of single-town districts.

== Death ==
Boatwright died of cancer on May 31, 2002, at age 82.
