= Mary T. Boatwright =

American historian (born 1952)

Mary Taliaferro Boatwright (born April 16, 1952) is a professor emerita of classical studies and ancient history at Duke University, specializing in Roman imperial history, Roman women, Roman topography, and Latin historiography.

== Early life ==
Boatwright was born in Virginia on April 16, 1952, to Victor Taliaferro Boatwright and Mary H. Boatwright. She was raised in Connecticut. Boatwright received her B.A. from Stanford University in 1973, and her Ph.D. from the University of Michigan at Ann Arbor in 1980. She is married with two children.

== Career ==
After 41 years teaching at Duke University in Durham, NC, USA, Boatwright is now Professor Emerita of classical studies there. Her teaching spanned Roman history, Roman urbanism, Latin, and historiography, with some early courses in Greek history as well. Her research foci include the emperor Hadrian in Rome and in the provinces, the topography of Rome, roles and visibility of Roman women (imperial and other), and identity in Rome's imperial provinces. She led 13 doctoral dissertation committees at Duke and served on many more at Duke and neighboring University of North Carolina at Chapel Hill.

Boatwright's professional interests have led to numerous trips to Rome and regions within the former Roman empire, a deep interest in imperial and modern cities, and an abiding love for the Roman world and Roman history. Her career is bookended by two stints at the American Academy in Rome, where she held a Michigan Fellowship in 1977-78 and was a Resident in 2021. She has also maintained a career-long affiliation with the Intercollegiate Center for Classical Studies in Rome (ICCS or the Centro), first as an undergraduate student (F72, S73), then as a graduate assistant (1976–77), and finally as the Professor-in-Charge (1992–93). She has served on the ICCS Managing Committee for most of her career, steered dozens of college students there to spend a semester and helped to enrich the profession with a steady stream of younger classicists. Her ongoing work with the Centro informs her conviction that everyone, regardless of background or profession, can enjoy and benefit from the fascinating issues arising from classical studies.

== Service ==
At Duke, Boatwright served as her department's chair and interim chair, director of graduate studies, and director and interim director of undergraduate studies. For the university she regularly contributed to initiatives related to undergraduate education and to faculty appointment, promotion, and tenure. National and professional service includes serving on the editorial board of the Journal of Ancient History and as the 2019 president of the Society for Classical Studies (SCS).

== Selected publications ==
- Hadrian and the City of Rome, Princeton University Press, 1987.
- Hadrian and the Cities of the Roman Empire, Princeton University Press, 2000.
- The Shapes of City Life in Rome and Pompeii, Caratzas, 2000. (Co-editor with HB Evans)
- Peoples of the Roman World, Cambridge University Press, 2012.
- The Romans: From Village to Empire, 2nd ed., Oxford University Press, 2011. (With D Gargola, N Lenski, and RJA Talbert)
- A Brief History of the Romans, 2nd ed., Oxford University Press, 2013. (With D Gargola, N Lenski, and RJA Talbert)
- History of the ICCS: The First Fifty Years (1965-2015), Centro Press, 2015. (With M Maas and C Smith)
- Imperial Women of Rome: Power, Gender, Context, Oxford University Press, 2021.

Among Boatwright's many articles are “Imperial Women of the Early Second Century A.C.” (American Journal of Philology 1991; winner of the AJP Best Article Prize 1991); “The Elogia of the Volusii Saturnini at Lucus Feroniae, and the Education of their Domestic Service” (2013); and “Acceptance and Approval: Romans’ Non-Roman Population Transfers, 180 BCE – 70 CE” (Phoenix 2015).
