= Robert B. Strassler =

American businessman and editor

- Born: c. 1937
- Occupation: Businessman; editor
- Subject: Ancient history
- Notable works: The Landmark Thucydides: A Comprehensive Guide to the Peloponnesian War (1996); The Landmark Herodotus: The Histories (2007); The Landmark Xenophon's Hellenika (2009); The Landmark Arrian: The Campaigns of Alexander (2010); The Landmark Julius Caesar: The Complete Works (2017); The Landmark Xenophon's Anabasis (2021)
- Notable awards: Society for Classical Studies Outreach Prize; 2014

Robert B. Strassler (born c. 1937) is a businessman, book editor, and unaffiliated scholar. He is best known for his work on the Landmark Ancient Histories series. Strassler's editions of classical texts, such as those by Herodotus, Thucydides, and Xenophon, have detailed annotations, maps, and appendices, to help readers better understand these ancient works.

== Early life and education ==
Robert B. Strassler’s parents were Samuel A. Strassler (1904–1982) and Frieda Strassler (née Cohen, 1907–1999), and were of Ashkenazi Jewish background. Strassler’s father "made a bundle in the wake of the Depression, running syndicates that bought and fixed up liquidated companies”. Robert and his brother David H. Strassler entered the family businesses (initially oil-field equipment, later investments) after their education.

Strassler attended the Ethical Culture Fieldston School, a prep school in the Bronx, where he was introduced to the classics. He then pursued a history degree at Harvard. During his undergraduate studies, he arranged for an individual tutorial with classics instructor George Nadel, Ph.D. '55, meeting in Nadel's Lowell House quarters for three hours weekly to discuss his papers and readings.

After completing his history B.A., he attended Harvard Business School, graduating with his M.B.A. in 1961 as a Baker Scholar in the top 5% of his class.

== Career ==
=== Business ===
After obtaining his M.B.A., Strassler went into business with his father and brother. Initially, they focused on oil-field equipment, where he made his fortune, and later moved into securities management. Strassler helped manage various companies over 20 years, including a marine shipyard, a steel mill, a printing press manufacturer, a retail department store, a die-casting company, a plastic extrusion firm, a shoe machinery company, and a small company in the oil-field equipment business.

In 1983, he restructured the oil-field equipment business, sold it, and retired. After retirement, he moved to Massachusetts, where he helped his brother start a family-run investment fund based in Great Barrington, Massachusetts.

=== Scholarship ===
Strassler retained an interest in ancient history, and in 1976 he became affiliated with Simon's Rock College (now Bard College at Simon’s Rock) in Great Barrington, Massachusetts. The provost asked him to teach a course on ancient Greek history, and he served as a trustee for many years. He saw that students had difficulty working with existing editions of ancient works, and despite being nontenured at any university and unable to read Greek or Latin, in 1989 he decided to start working on new reader-friendly editions. Strassler also published articles in the peer-reviewed academic journal The Journal of Hellenic Studies in 1988 and 1990.

Strassler's editions have received generally positive reviews. For example, in The New Yorker Daniel Mendelsohn described The Landmark Herodotus (2007) as "bristling with appendices, by a phalanx of experts, on everything from the design of Athenian warships to ancient units of liquid measure", although he said the translation was "pedestrian".

In 1996, Bard College at Simon's Rock awarded him an honorary Doctorate of Humanities and Letters. In 2014, the Society for Classical Studies awarded Strassler their Outreach Prize for conceiving, initiating, and editing the Landmark Ancient Histories.

=== Volunteer work ===
Strassler has participated in the volunteer fire department in Alford, Massachusetts, and chaired the Aston Magna Foundation for Music and the Humanities.

== Works ==
=== Books ===
Strassler edited the following books:

1. The Landmark Thucydides: A Comprehensive Guide to the Peloponnesian War (1996)
2. The Landmark Herodotus: The Histories (2007)
3. The Landmark Xenophon's Hellenika (2009)

He served as series editor for the following books:

1. The Landmark Arrian: The Campaigns of Alexander (2010)
2. The Landmark Julius Caesar: The Complete Works (2017)
3. The Landmark Xenophon's Anabasis (2021)

=== Articles ===
Strassler wrote the following articles in The Journal of Hellenic Studies:

1. The opening of the Pylos campaign
2. The harbor at Pylos, 425 B.C.
