= Landmark Ancient Histories =

Annotated ancient history textbooks

The Landmark Ancient Histories is a series of annotated editions for ancient history textbooks, edited by Robert B. Strassler, and published by Pantheon Books (a Random House imprint).

== Volumes ==
As of 2024, six volumes were published in this series:

1. The Landmark Thucydides: A Comprehensive Guide to the Peloponnesian War (1996), an edition of Thucydides's History of the Peloponnesian War, translated by Richard Crawley. ISBN 978-1416590873, xxxiv+713 pages.
2. The Landmark Herodotus: The Histories (2007), an edition of Histories by Herodotus, translated by Andrea L. Purvis, edited and annotated by Strassler. ISBN 978-0375421099, lxiv+959 pages.
3. The Landmark Xenophon's Hellenika (2009), an edition of Xenophon's Hellenica, translated by John Marincola, edited and annotated by Strassler. ISBN 978-0375422553, lxxxii+585 pages.
4. The Landmark Arrian: The Campaigns of Alexander (2010), an edition of Arrian's Anabasis of Alexander, translated by Pamela Mensch, edited and annotated by James Romm. ISBN 978-0375423468, l+503 pages.
5. The Landmark Julius Caesar: The Complete Works (2017), an edition of the works ascribed to Julius Caesar, including The Gallic War, The Civil War, The Alexandrian War, The African War, and The Spanish War, translated, edited, and annotated by Kurt A. Raaflaub. ISBN 978-0307377869, xcii+804 pages.
6. The Landmark Xenophon's Anabasis (2021), an edition of Xenophon's Anabasis, translated by David Thomas, edited and annotated by Shane Brennan and David Thomas. ISBN 978-0307906854, lxx+601 pages.

Each volume contains a translation of the ancient text, detailed annotations, a large number of maps, extensive footnotes and margin notes, summaries of each "book" (chapter) of the text, numerous appendixes, and an index. The translation, with the exception of Crawley's translation of Thucydides, are new translations commissioned specifically for these editions.

== Reception ==
The series was received with appreciation and positive reviews from both scholars and book reviews. For example, Edward Rothstein wrote in the New York Times that "the publication of 'The Landmark Herodotus' (Pantheon) which includes a new translation by Andrea L. Purvis, and extensive annotation by scholars is such a worthy occasion for celebrating Herodotus' contemporary importance." Michael Kulikowski wrote, in the London Review of Books, comparing The Landmark Julius Caesar to a later translation, wrote that:

"the Landmark Julius Caesar that appeared just three years ago ... includes the whole Caesarian corpus, as well as hundreds of maps and illustrations. In contrast to [the newer translation], it has a dozen meaty footnotes on every page, with a running chronology and summary glosses in the margin. One could teach its schematic battle plans at West Point. And the translation dramatically bulks out Caesar's own words."

Describing the series as a whole, James Romm wrote, in the Wall Street Journal:

"Beginning with 'The Landmark Thucydides,' published by the Free Press in 1996, Mr. Strassler showed his determination to leave no reader behind. He supplied detailed maps on nearly every third page of text and clear, full annotation that removed potential stumbling blocks. Headings kept readers oriented in time and space, as did brief summaries, running down the book's generously wide margins, of each stage of the action. Well-curated photographs of objects and sites turned a mere encounter with the Peloponnesian War into an immersion in classical Greece. Appendix essays set new standards for readability and point. An opening chronology laid out the events of the text in sequence, and a closing index, done in unprecedented detail, provided a precise means of finding whatever item one might be looking for."

The series also sold well; Rothstein notes that as of 2007, eleven years after its publication, The Landmark Thucydides "sold an astonishing 30,000 copies in hardcover and more than 40,000 in paper".
