= Kimberly D. Bowes =

Professor of Classical Studies

Kimberly D. Bowes (born 1970) is an American archaeologist who is a professor of Classical Studies at the University of Pennsylvania. She specializes in archeology, material culture and economics of the Roman and the later Roman world. She was the Director of the American Academy in Rome from 2014–2017. She is the author of three monographs.

== Biography ==
Bowes obtained her Bachelor of Arts (summa cum laude) at Williams College in 1992 and a Masters of Arts with distinction from the Courtauld Institute of Art in 1993. She was a visiting fellow at Harvard University in 2001, completed her PhD at Princeton University, and began her career as a postdoctoral fellow and lecturer at Yale University in 2002. Prior to beginning at the University of Pennsylvania in 2010, Bowes taught at Fordham University (2004–2007), Cornell University (2007–2010), and the American Academy in Rome (2012–2014).

She is currently the director of Integrated Studies, a freshman-year intensive liberal arts course for the Benjamin Franklin Scholars at the University of Pennsylvania.

== Research ==
In recent years, a significant shift in both focus and practice transpired in Bowes’ research. While she is continuously focused on the archaeology and material culture of the Roman and later Roman worlds, her research interests have shifted from late antiquity and the archeologies of religion and elite space to historical economies with a distinct focus on poverty and the lived experience of the poor. Her 2025 study on Roman peasants in Italy reflects a greater attention to non-elites in the studies of Roman archaeology and economic history and a shift in her methodology, integrating archaeological and scientific data, anthropological theory and historical economics become.

From 2009-2015, Bowes co-directed the Roman Peasant Project in Italy with colleagues. The Project was the first systematic study of the lifestyles and experiences of Roman peasants in Italy, and was supported by the National Science Foundation, the Loeb Foundation and the Penn Museum. The final two-volume publication, The Roman Peasant Project 2009-2015: Excavating the Roman Rural Poor, was published by the Penn Museum and University of Pennsylvania Press in February 2021.

== Books ==
=== Monographs ===
- Surviving Rome: The Economic Lives of the Ninety Percent, Princeton University Press, 2025. ISBN 978-0691273334
- House and Society in the Later Roman Empire (2010) ISBN 978-0-7156-3882-8
- Private Worship, Public Values and Religious Change in Late Antiquity (2011) ISBN 978-0-521-88593-5

=== Edited volumes ===
- National Narratives and the Medieval Mediterranean. (special issue of Memoirs of the American Academy in Rome, edited with W. Tronzo, 2018)
- Between Text and Territory: Survey and Excavation in the terra of San Vincenzo al Volturno (edited with R. Hodges and K. Francis, 2007) ISBN 978-0-904152-48-7
- Hispania in Late Antiquity: Current Perspectives (edited and translated with M. Kulikowski, 2005)
