= William K. Pritchett =

American ancient Greek history scholar (1909–2007)

William Kendrick Pritchett (April 14, 1909 – May 29, 2007) was an American scholar of ancient Greek history. He authored over 30 books on the subjects of Greek warfare, topography, and time-keeping.

== Biography ==
Pritchett was born in Atlanta, Georgia, on April 14, 1909, to Leon and Katherine Pritchett. He received a Bachelor of Arts degree from Davidson College in 1929, and a Master of Arts from Duke University in 1930.

He co-authored the book The Chronology of Hellenistic Athens (1940) with his mentor Benjamin Dean Meritt. Shortly after the attack on Pearl Harbor, he enlisted in the United States Army Air Corps. He served until 1945, attaining the rank of captain. Towards the end of the war, he participated in the collection and presentation of evidence during the Nuremberg trials.

In 1943, he published his Doctor of Philosophy dissertation on the five Attic tribes after Kleisthenes. He authored another book on Athenian time-keeping, The Calendars of Athens, in 1948.

In 1948, Pritchett became associate professor of Greek at UC Berkeley, becoming full professor in 1956. He taught at Berkeley until 1976. He retired in 1977, receiving the Berkeley Citation in recognition of his academic work. Upon his retirement, UC Berkeley established the W.K. Pritchett Prize, which is awarded to the student who performs best in first-year Greek.

Pritchett continued to write prolifically after his retirement from teaching. He published a number of books, including Studies in Ancient Greek Topography (1993), and The Liar School of Herodotus (1993). The latter was an outgrowth of his work on topography, and critiqued the work of scholars like François Hartog who argued that Herodotus work was "consciously fictionalizing".

He wrote a number of books on Greek warfare, including Ancient Greek Military Practices (1971), and The Greek State at War, a five-volume work published between 1971 and 1991. He also published a survey on excavations and fieldwork in Marathon, Greece.

He received an honorary Doctor of Humane Letters degree from Davidson College in 1987. He received two Guggenheim Fellowships, and was a fellow of both the Royal Irish Academy and British Academy.

== Bibliography ==
- The Chronology of Hellenistic Athens (1940)
- Studies in Ancient Greek Topography (1993)
- The Liar School of Herodotus (1993)
