= Peter Struck (classicist) =

American professor of classical studies

Peter T. Struck is Vartan Gregorian Professor of the Humanities and Professor of Classical Studies at the University of Pennsylvania as well as the Stephen A. Levin Family Dean of College of Arts & Sciences dean of the College of Arts & Sciences. He is the co-founder with Sarah Igo of the National Forum on the Future of Liberal Education. He sits on the editorial board of the Journal of the History of Ideas.

== Selected publications ==
- Birth of the Symbol: Ancient Readers at the Limits of Their Texts. Princeton, 2004. (Awarded the Goodwin Award of Merit from the American Philological Association for best book in classical studies.)
- Mantikê: Studies in Ancient Divination. Brill, 2006. (Edited with Sarah Iles Johnston)
- The Cambridge Companion to Allegory. Cambridge University Press, 2010. (Edited with Rita Copeland)
- Divination and Human Nature: A Cognitive History of Intuition in Antiquity. Princeton, 2016. (Awarded the Goodwin Award of Merit from the American Philological Association for best book in classical studies. Only person to win this award twice in its history.)
