= Edward Togo Salmon =

British classical historian of the Samnites (1905–1988)

Edward Togo Salmon (May 29, 1905, in London, England – 1988) was an ancient historian best known for his work on the Samnites and the Romanization of Italy.

== Life ==
Salmon was born in London, England, and was given his middle name after Admiral Togo who sank the Russian Fleet in 1905.

He was educated at the University of Sydney, New South Wales, Australia, where he obtained his B.A. degree in classics and English. He then went to the University of Cambridge where he received his M.A. and Ph.D. degrees, followed by postgraduate studies in Italy.

Salmon is best known for his academic career at McMaster University in Hamilton, Ontario, where he taught for 43 years from 1930. He held the posts of Chair of the Department of History and Messecar Professor of History at McMaster, as well as the first Principal of University College and Academic Vice-President. He is the namesake of the university's Togo Salmon Hall. A fund named in his honor supports the classics at McMaster. He helped established the McMaster Museum of Art in 1967.

During the Second World War he was a news commentator on station CKOC.

== Selected bibliography ==
- 1944; rev. ed 1963, 1968. A history of the Roman world from 30 B.C. to A.D. 138.
- 1967. Samnium and the Samnites. Cambridge University Press.
- 1970. Roman colonization under the Republic. Cornell University Press.
- 1974. Polis and imperium : studies in honour of Edward Togo Salmon. Toronto: Hakkert.
- 1974. The nemesis of empire. Oxford University Press.
- 1982. The making of Roman Italy. Cornell University Press.
