= Helen F. North =

American classical scholar

Helen Florence North (1922-2012) was an American classical scholar and an expert on Greek and Roman literature.

== Early life and education ==
North was the daughter of James H. and Catherine (nee Debbold) North. A native of Utica, she was educated at Cornell University, where she studied Classics, gaining a Bachelor's degree in 1942, a Master's in 1943 and a doctorate in 1945.

== Career ==
North taught at Rosary College, Illinois, before becoming a faculty member at Swarthmore College in 1948, where she remained until her retirement in 1991. During this time she also held visiting teaching appointments at Barnard College, Columbia University, Vassar College, and Cornell University, where she gave the Charles Beebe Martin Classical lectures in 1972. The subject of the lectures was 'The Shield of Amphiaraus: Reflections of Greek Ethical Doctrine in Literature and Art', and they were later published as her book From Myth to Icon (Cornell University Press, 1979).

She had a longstanding connection with the American Academy in Rome, beginning with her appointment as a World War II Fellow there in 1942; she later served on the Board of Trustees (1972-1975 as ex-ofiicio member and elected trustee of the Advisory Council to the Classical School, then from 1977-1994 as a regular member of the Board). She was also a Resident there in 1980, then chaired the Committee on the Classical School (1981-1995). In 1995 she was awarded the Academy's Centennial Medal for her contributions to the welfare of the organisation. From 1975-6 she was also a staff member at the American School of Classical Studies at Athens, where she was also Chair of the Committee on Publications from 1980-1982.

In the course of her career she received several major academic awards, including a fellowship from the National Endowment for the Humanities, a Fulbright Fellowship, and awards from the Ford Foundation, and National Humanities Center as well as two Guggenheim Fellowships in Classics (1958 and 1975). She was president of the American Philological Association in 1976.

In 1969 she received the Goodwin Award of the American Philological Association for her first book, Sophrosyne: Self-Knowledge and Self-Restraint in Greek Literature (1966). She also received honorary doctorates from Trinity College Dublin, Fordham University, La Salle University, and Yale University.

After her retirement she remained connected to Swarthmore as Professor Emerita, and the Helen F. North lecture was founded in her honour in 2001.

North was elected to the American Academy of Arts and Sciences in 1975 and the American Philosophical Society in 1991.

== Selected publications ==
- 1966. Sophrosyne: Self-Knowledge and Self-Restraint in Greek Literature (Cornell Studies in Classical Philology xxxv, Cornell University Press)
- 1979. From Myth to Icon: Reflections of Greek Ethical Doctrine in Literature and Art (Cornell University Press)
