= Berthold Ullman =

American classical scholar (1882–1965)

Berthold Louis Ullman (August 18, 1882 – June 26, 1965) was an American classicist.

== Life and career ==
Ullman was born in Chicago to Louis Ullman and Eleanora Fried. He was educated at the University of Chicago (A.B. 1903, Ph.D. 1908). He joined the faculty at Chicago and also taught at the University of Pittsburgh and Iowa State University. He taught at the University of Chicago from 1925 until 1944 before moving to the University of North Carolina at Chapel Hill, becoming Kenan professor of Latin and department chair. Ullman's library collection formed the core of the present classics department library at the University of North Carolina. Ullman was also president of the American Philological Association in 1935. In 1948, he was elected as a member of the American Academy of Arts and Sciences.

He married Mary Louise Bates on September 1, 1909. Their son Edward Ullman, born in 1912, became a geographer.

As a scholar Ullman focused on Latin language, the manuscript tradition of ancient texts, and Latin in the Renaissance.

Ullman died in 1965 in Vatican City.

== Books ==
- Ullman, Berthold Louis, Norman E. Henry, Charles Henderson Latin for Americans (frequently revised, still in print)
- Ullman, Berthold Louis Sicconis Polentonis Scriptorum Illustrium Latinae Linguae Libri XVIII, 1928
- Ullman, Berthold Louis Ancient Writing and its Influence, 1932
- Ullman, Berthold Louis Coluccii Salutati De Laboribus Herculis, 2 volumes, 1951
- Ullman, Berthold Louis Studies in the Italian Renaissance 1955
- Ullman, Berthold Louis Colucii Salutati De seculo et religione 1957
- Ullman, Berthold Louis The Origin and Development of Humanistic Script 1960
- Ullman, Berthold Louis, Philip A. Stadter The Public Library of Renaissance Florence 1972
