= Society for Classical Studies =

American learned society for classics

- Formation: 1869
- Type: Learned society
- Headquarters: 20 Cooper Square, 3rd Floor, New York University, New York City, U.S.
- Location: United States
- Executive Director: Zachary Slates
- Subsidiaries: Transactions of the American Philological Association
- Affiliations: American Council of Learned Societies (member)
- Website: classicalstudies.org
- Formerly called: American Philological Association

The Society for Classical Studies (SCS), formerly known as the American Philological Association (APA), is a non-profit North American scholarly organization devoted to all aspects of Greek and Roman civilization founded in 1869. It is the preeminent association in the field and publishes a journal, Transactions of the American Philological Association (TAPA). The SCS is currently based at New York University.

== History ==
The APA was inaugurated by William D. Whitney, of Yale, at Poughkeepsie, New York, in 1869 as an outgrowth of the Classical Section of the Oriental Society. Of the 151 inaugural members, just 8 were women, including Alice Robinson Boise Wood, the first woman to study (informally) at the University of Michigan and to graduate with a B.A. from the Old University of Chicago. Originally its members studied a great variety of texts and languages, but as disciplines such as linguistics and modern languages have created their own societies, the APA came to be concerned with classical antiquity and fields closely related to the study of antiquity, while the definition of "philology" broadened to include many approaches to understanding the ancient world. In 2013, the American Philological Association elected to change its name to the Society for Classical Studies.

== Convention ==
The Society holds its annual convention in January, meeting jointly with the Archaeological Institute of America. About 400 scholarly papers are delivered at the Society's meeting, which is also the site for interviewing for college and university positions and for the meetings of the many committees and affiliated groups. It is also the occasion for the presentation of Society awards for teaching, public outreach, and scholarly publications publication, including the Goodwin Award of Merit, which recognizes a recently published book.

At every meeting, an Outreach Division conducts two events that are open to the general public. One is a special panel that is of interest to non-specialists. Topics have included the movie Troy, Classics and Contemporary Fiction and the HBO series Rome and Classics and Comics. The second is the staged reading of a classical or classically themed play, by the Committee on Ancient and Modern Performance. The productions have been: The Invention of Love (Tom Stoppard, directed by Mary-Kay Gamel, produced by Judith Hallett), The Heavensgate Deposition (based on Apocolocyntosis by Seneca the Younger, adapted by Douglass Parker, directed by Amy R. Cohen, produced by Thomas Jenkins), The Golden Age (by Thomas Heywood, directed by C. W. Marshall), Iran Man (based on Persa by Plautus, directed by Mary-Kay Gamel), Thespis (by W. S. Gilbert and A. S. Sullivan, with new music by Alan Riley Jones, directed by John Starks, produced by John Given), The Birds (by Aristophanes, directed by Thomas Talboy), Cyclops (by Euripides, directed by Laura Lippman and Mike Lippman), Thersites (perhaps by Nicholas Udall, directed by C. W. Marshall), Thesmophoriazusae (by Aristophanes, directed by Bella Vivante), The Jurymen (by Katherine Janson, directed by Amy R. Cohen) and Alcestis (by Euripides, translated by Mary-Kay Gamel, directed by Gamel and Mark Damen).

== Awards ==
The Society presents awards, fellowships and grants for teaching at both pre-collegiate and collegiate level, for projects that bring classics to a wider public, and for research and publication. In addition to the prestigious Goodwin Award of Merit, recognizing scholarly books by Society members, these include the SCS Awards for Excellence in Academic Advising and in Teaching (at both the collegiate and high school level) and the Mary-Kay Gamel Outreach Prize. The Society also recognizes graduate student writing through the Erich S. Gruen Prize and literary translation through the Raffaella Cribiore Award for Outstanding Literary Translation.

=== Goodwin Award of Merit ===
The Charles J. Goodwin Award of Merit is the Society's annual prize for outstanding publications in the field of classics, named in honor of Charles Jaques Goodwin (1866–1935), a long-time member and benefactor of the Society. Award recipients are chosen by a five-member elected committee and presented at the Society's annual meeting. Prior to the creation of the Raffaella Cribiore Award in 2025, they were the only prizes for books given by the Society.

Works eligible for the award must be published by a member of the Society during the preceding three years. Until 2013, the award had a single recipient; since then, the SCS Board of Directors mandated the Committee make three awards each year. The Goodwin Award is considered among the most prestigious accolades in classical studies and has had only one repeat winner, Peter T. Struck. Its inaugural recipient was David Magie of Princeton University in 1951.

=== Mary-Kay Gamel Outreach Prize ===
The Outreach Prize recognizes outstanding projects or events by an SCS member or members that make an aspect of classical antiquity available and attractive to an audience other than classics scholars or students in their courses. Previously known as the APA Scholarly Outreach Prize, it was later renamed in honor of translator and classical theatre producer Mary-Kay Gamel of the University of California, Santa Cruz, who won the prize in 2009. Previous winners include Robert B. Strassler for editing the Landmark Ancient Histories and Sarah Bond for her portfolio of public writing. The inaugural prize in 2009 was split between Herbert Golder, editor-in-chief of the classics journal Arion, and archaeologist Ann Olga Koloski-Ostrow of Brandeis University.

=== Gruen Prize ===
The Erich S. Gruen Prize recognizes the best graduate research paper on multiculturalism in the ancient Mediterranean. Named in honor of ancient historian Erich S. Gruen, a former president of the APA and long-time professor at the University of California, Berkeley, the prize awards high-quality papers treating any aspect of race, ethnicity, or cultural exchange as it pertains to the ancient Mediterranean by any student currently enrolled in a North American graduate program, regardless of citizenship, immigration status, or Society membership. The prize was first awarded in 2020 to Kelly Nguyen of Brown University.

=== Raffaella Cribiore Award ===
The Raffaella Cribiore Award for Outstanding Literary Translation honors up to two books each year by Society members published within the past three calendar years, each translating a primary text in Ancient Greek or Latin. The award is named in memory of Raffaella Cribiore of New York University, the 2004 winner of the Goodwin Award. The award's inaugural recipient was C. Luke Soucy of Princeton University in 2025.

== Activities ==
Through its divisions of Research, Education, Publications, Professional Matters, and Program, the Society conducts a variety of activities to support and disseminate knowledge of the ancient Greek and Roman worlds. For example, it operates a Placement Service, gathers statistical information about the demographics of classicists, hears complaints of violations of professional ethics, provides advice and funding for major research projects (such as the Barrington Atlas of the Greek and Roman World), and publishes monographs, textbooks and software. The Outreach Division produces a newsletter, Amphora, for non-specialists, and the electronic newsletter The Dionysiac, which gives information about performances of classical plays and other events related to ancient performance.

== Scholars ==
Many notable scholars have served as executives of the APA and SCS, including Basil Lanneau Gildersleeve, William Watson Goodwin, Herbert Weir Smyth, Paul Shorey, Lily Ross Taylor, Berthold Ullman, Thomas Robert Shannon Broughton, Gerald Else, Helen F. North, Bernard Knox, Charles Segal, Emily Vermeule, and Shelley Haley.
