= John Kinloch Anderson =

Scottish classicist and archaeologist (1924–2015)

- Born: 3 January 1924; Multan, Punjab, British India
- Died: 13 October 2015 (aged 91); California, US
- Title: Professor of Classics and Ancient History and Mediterranean Archaeology Emeritus
- Spouse: Esperance (died 2000)
- Children: 3
- Awards: Guggenheim Fellowship (1966)

Academic background
- Education: Christ Church, Oxford (BA); University of Otago (MA)

Academic work
- Discipline: Classicist, historian and archaeologist
- Sub-discipline: Ancient Mediterranean specialist
- Institutions: University of Otago (1953–1958); University of California, Berkeley (1958–1993)
- Notable works: Ancient Greek Horsemanship (1961); Military Theory and Practice in the Age of Xenophon (1970); Xenophon (1974); Hunting in the Ancient World (1985)

John Kinloch Anderson (3 January 1924 – 13 October 2015) was a Scottish classicist, archaeologist, and author. He wrote several influential books on ancient Greek warfare, ancient Greek art, and the practice of equestrianism and hunting in the ancient world. He also published dozens of articles and book chapters about ancient history, philology, and archaeology.

Anderson was born in Multan, British India, in 1924 and spent much of his early life in Scotland. He attended Trinity College, Glenalmond until 1942, when he enlisted in the British Army to serve in World War II. He served with the Intelligence Corps and the Black Watch during their campaigns in Greece, Sicily, and Burma. After the war, he obtained a bachelor's degree in classics at Christ Church, Oxford.

Between 1949 and 1952, Anderson did archaeological work in Greece and Turkey, and was a MacMillan Fellow at Yale University in the United States. He taught classical languages and ancient history at the University of Otago in New Zealand from 1953 to 1958. After moving to California in 1958, he taught at the University of California, Berkeley until his retirement in 1993 as Professor of Classics and Ancient History and Mediterranean Archaeology Emeritus. During his retirement, he authored several children's colouring books and was involved in nature conservation in the Berkeley Hills region before his death in 2015.

== Early life and education ==
John Kinloch Anderson, nicknamed "Jock", was born in Multan, Punjab in British India on 3 January 1924. He was born three weeks postterm; his mother was reportedly assured by the ayah, or nanny, that the delayed birth signified that Anderson would be "a very wise child". Anderson was Scottish and spent much of his childhood in Scotland, where many of his relatives lived. He obtained his secondary education at the private boarding school Trinity College, Glenalmond from 1937 to 1942. He was an experienced horse rider and won several horse races in his early life.

=== British Army service ===
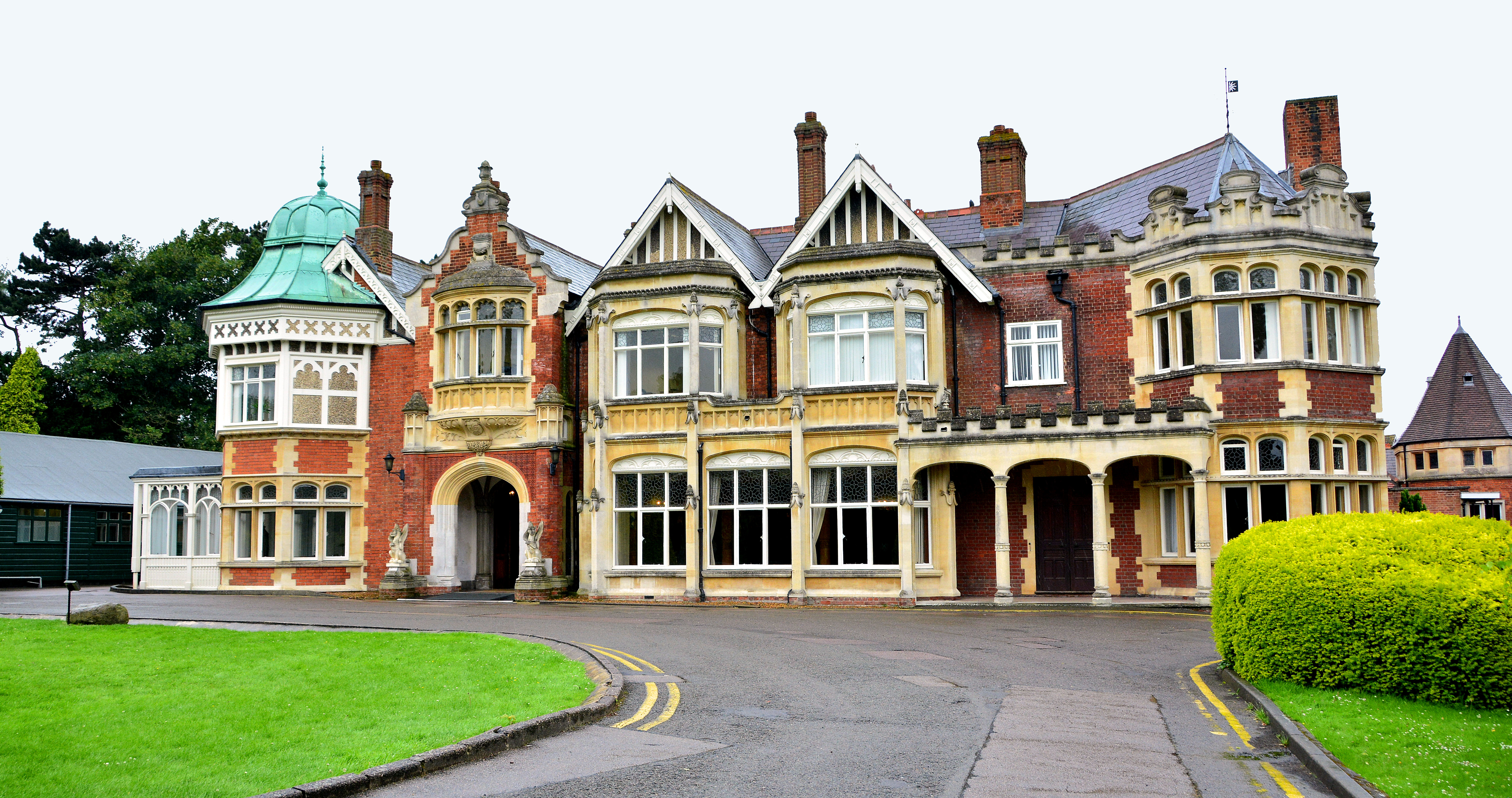
Anderson spent part of his military service at the Bletchley Park code-breaking site.

Anderson abandoned his studies to enlist in the British Army and serve in World War II. In 1943, he trained at the Inter-Service Special Intelligence School in Bedford, England. He served in the British Intelligence Corps, and was an intelligence officer in the Black Watch regiment of the British Army. Anderson was deployed in campaigns in Greece, Sicily, and Burma. His ability to quickly become fluent in several Asian languages was useful to his intelligence unit during their campaign in South-East Asia. For part of his military service, he was stationed at the Bletchley Park estate, a code-breaking site in Milton Keynes, England. He was also stationed at the Wireless Experimental Centre in Delhi.

=== University education and archaeological work ===
In 1946, after the conclusion of the war, Anderson began studying classics at Christ Church, Oxford, where he received his Bachelor of Arts degree in 1949. From 1949 to 1950, he studied at the British School at Athens. He held a MacMillan Fellowship at Yale University in the United States from 1950 to 1952. During this time, Anderson participated in archaeological expeditions in Greece and Turkey, including excavations at sites in Corinth, Chios, and Smyrna.

== Teaching career ==
=== University of Otago ===
In January 1953, he began teaching classical languages and ancient history at University of Otago in Dunedin, New Zealand. While living in New Zealand, he met his wife Esperance, with whom he had three children; Elizabeth, Katherine Mary, and John. He taught at the University of Otago until 1958, the same year that he received his master of arts degree from the university. That year, he was offered an appointment as lecturer in classical archaeology at University of California, Berkeley in the United States.

=== University of California, Berkeley ===
In 1958, Anderson and his family moved to Berkeley, California, in the United States, where he taught at the University of California, Berkeley. He was promoted from lecturer to assistant professor, associate professor, and then full professor of classical archaeology. In 1966, Anderson was granted a Guggenheim Fellowship for his research. Anderson had an interest in ancient Greek art, particularly vase painting. In the 1970s and 1980s, he was curator of the university's Lowie Museum, which is now known as the Phoebe A. Hearst Museum of Anthropology. He organised exhibitions of ancient Greek art from the museum's collection and edited its exhibition catalogues.

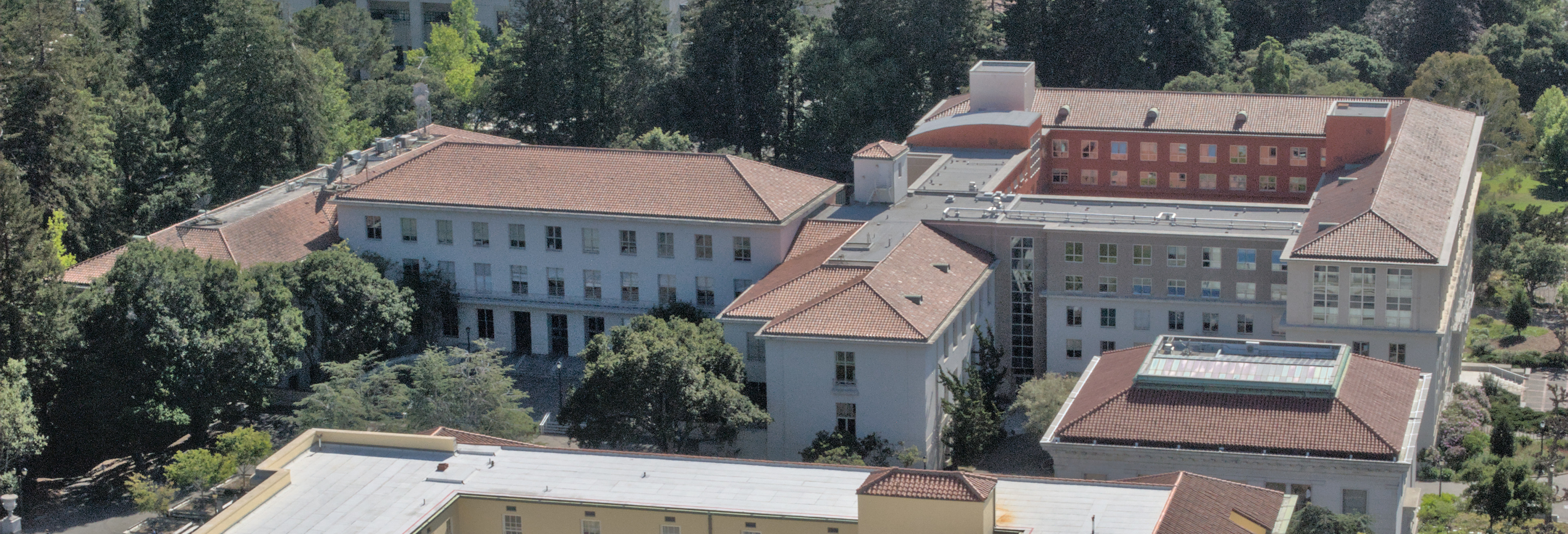
Anderson taught in the University of California, Berkeley's classics department, which is located in Dwinelle Hall (pictured).

Anderson was known at the university for having an extensive knowledge of English, Scottish, and Greek poetry, and for his ability to recite large volumes of poetry from memory. He spoke with a slight but distinctive stutter, although this did not prevent him from lecturing. He became a popular instructor at the university, particularly for his introductory course on classical archaeology. He was known for grading blue book exams by himself without a teaching assistant, often evaluating them while he lay in bed before sleeping.

Anderson served on the classics department's Master of Arts and PhD committees, and was a founding member of its graduate group in Ancient History and Mediterranean Archaeology (AHMA). In 1988, he received an award for Excellence in Teaching from the university. He retired from teaching in 1993, but retained the title of Professor of Classics and Ancient History and Mediterranean Archaeology Emeritus.

== Research and writing ==
Anderson authored his first academic articles while teaching at the University of Otago. His earliest articles pertained to the archaeology, art, and topography of Achaea, Corinth, and Smyrna, and were published in the Annual of the British School at Athens. In 1955, Anderson published his first book, A Handbook to the Greek Vases in the Otago Museum. The majority of his scholarship focused on ancient Greek warfare, particularly ancient Greek cavalry, the structure and equipment of hoplite armies, and ancient military theory. Dutch historian Roel Konijnendijk suggested that Anderson's interest in military history and views on the topic were shaped by his wartime experiences.

Anderson based his research on ancient primary sources, especially the Classical Greek historians Xenophon, Herodotus, and Thucydides. Anderson was mentored by classicists Frank Adcock, Thomas Dunbabin, Louis Alexander MacKay, William K. Pritchett, and Henry Roy William Smith; all of whom he credited with influencing his later ideas and publications. He published dozens of articles in international academic journals such as the American Journal of Archaeology, The Classical Journal, Classical Philology, Classical World, Hesperia, The Journal of Hellenic Studies, and California Studies in Classical Antiquity.

Anderson's personal experience with horses inspired him to write Ancient Greek Horsemanship (1961). The book covers horsemanship in the Mediterranean from the Bronze Age (c. 3300–1200 BCE) until the Islamic conquest of Spain in the 8th century CE. As part of his research, Anderson personally attempted some of the historical riding procedures described in the book, including riding with a rope halter instead of a bit and bridle. In addition to historical evidence, he cited his own knowledge of equestrianism to support his arguments about equestrian practices in the ancient era. At the time of its publication, the book received positive reviews in academic journals, with praise directed at Anderson's well-reasoned analysis of an expansive body of historical evidence. Its success established Anderson as an expert in the field of equestrian history.

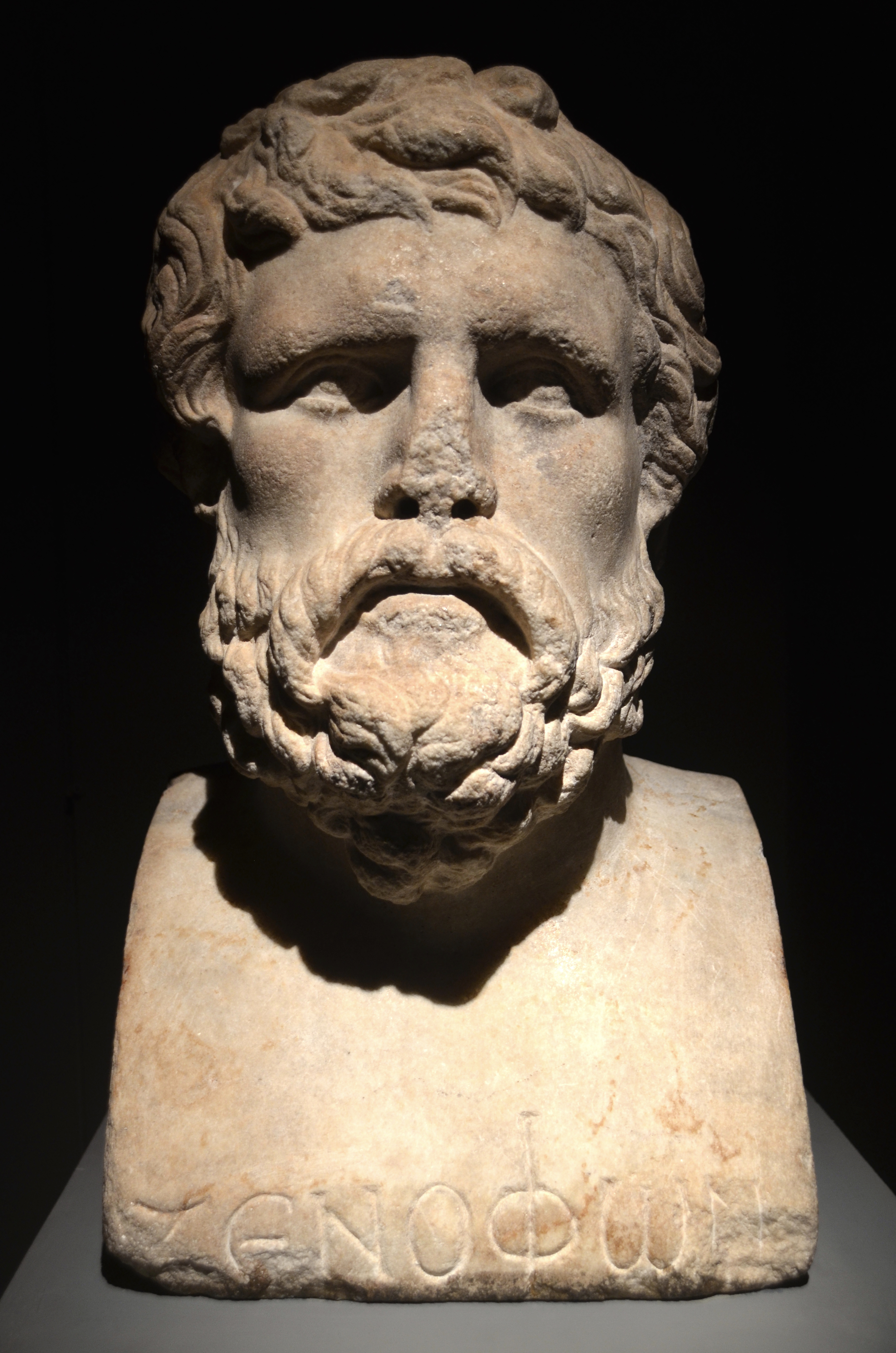
Posthumous bust of Xenophon, created c. 120 CE

In 1970, he published Military Theory and Practice in the Age of Xenophon. The book primarily deals with the technical aspects of the Classical Spartan army between the 5th and 4th century BCE. The principle sources for the book are Xenophon's writings, including the Anabasis, Hellenica, and Cyropaedia, which Anderson supplements with other literary and archaeological evidence. The book received mostly positive reviews from contemporary academic journals. It was influential to other scholars; in 2014, Russian classicist Alexander A. Sinitsyn retroactively described the two decades following its publication as "the age of Anderson" in the field of ancient Greek warfare. Konijnendijk wrote that the book revived interest in the study of ancient Greek warfare in the United States.

In 1974, he published Xenophon, a shorter study aimed at a more general readership. The book provides an overview of Xenophon's personal life, military campaigns, and views on topics such as philosophy, warfare, hunting, and horse riding. In 1985, Anderson published Hunting in the Ancient World, which focused on hunting practices in ancient Greek and Roman culture. The book cites Greco-Roman art and literature, as well as comparative evidence from nearby cultures such as the Persians and Assyrians. A contemporary review by Donald G. Kyle in the Journal of Sport History noted that "this work is authoritative because of Anderson's scholarship and range as a classicist, archaeologist, and horseman." In addition to his monographs, Anderson also contributed chapters to works such as Civilization of the Ancient Mediterranean: Greece and Rome (1988), Hoplites: The classical Greek battle experience (1991), and The Ages of Homer (1995).

== Retirement and death ==
In the 1990s, Anderson wrote a series of children's colouring books about ancient history, which were illustrated by Nancy Conkle. During his retirement, he was a member of several academic societies, including the American Society for Classical Studies, the Archaeological Institute of America, the Society for the Promotion of Hellenic Studies, the British School at Athens, and the British School at Ankara. He was a founding member of the Berkeley Greek Club, a symposium for the translation and discussion of Greek literature that was founded in the early 1960s by philologist Louis Alexander MacKay. Anderson was a member of the club for over 50 years and retired a few years before 2014 as a result of memory loss.

Anderson lived with his wife Esperance near Tilden Regional Park in the Berkeley Hills. They were avid birdwatchers and were involved in nature conservation efforts in the California Regional Parks. Anderson was known for having considerable knowledge of the flora and fauna of California, and served as a docent at the Tilden Botanical Garden for several years. He continued to ride horses later in life, and taught his children and grandchildren to ride. Esperance died in 2000.

In 2014, the interdisciplinary academic journal Anabasis: Studia Classica et Orientalia honoured Anderson by publishing a biographical article about him for the occasion of his 90th birthday. Anderson died in California on 13 October 2015 at the age of 91.

== Selected bibliography ==
- Handbook to the Greek Vases in the Otago Museum. Dunedin: Otago Museum. 1955. OCLC 2334320.
- Ancient Greek Horsemanship. Berkeley, California: University of California Press. 1961. OCLC 781608.
- Military Theory and Practice in the Age of Xenophon. Berkeley, California: University of California Press. 1970. OCLC 63909.
- Xenophon. London: Duckworth Books. 1974. ISBN 978-0-7156-0702-2.
- Hunting in the Ancient World. Berkeley, California: University of California Press. 1985. ISBN 978-0-520-05197-3.
