= Ancient Greek Horsemanship =

1961 book by John Kinloch Anderson

- Cover of the 1961 Univ of California Press edition
- Author: John Kinloch Anderson
- Subject: Equestrian history
- Publisher: University of California Press
- Publication date: 1961
- Publication place: Berkeley and Los Angeles
- Pages: 244 (Note: Page count includes a 15-page introduction.)
- OCLC: 781608

Ancient Greek Horsemanship is a 1961 history book by John Kinloch Anderson, published by University of California Press. It focuses on the introduction of horses to the ancient Mediterranean and the development of horse riding practices, with a focus on ancient Greece. The book is primarily based on the Spartan general Xenophon's treatise On Horsemanship, which Anderson supplements with other evidence such as archaeology and ancient art. Anderson, who was an experienced horse rider, also references his personal experimentation with historical riding techniques.

At the time of its publication, the book received mostly positive reviews in academic journals. Reviewers praised the depth of Anderson's research and his combination of practical and historical knowledge, although some criticized aspects of its scope and layout. The book's success established Anderson's reputation as an expert in equestrian history.

== Background ==
John Kinloch Anderson spent much of his early life in Scotland and was an experienced horse rider who won several local horse races. He had a lifelong interest in all aspects of equestrianism, including history and contemporary practices. He experimentally practiced historical riding techniques, such as riding without a bit and bridle and using only a rope halter.

In 1953, Anderson began teaching classics at the University of Otago in Dunedin, New Zealand. He moved to the United States in 1958 and became a professor of classics at the University of California, Berkeley. In 1962, he published Ancient Greek Horsemanship through University of California Press. It was Anderson's second book, his first being a handbook of the Otago Museum's Greek vases. When writing the book, Anderson used both his knowledge of ancient sources and his personal experience with horses.

== Summary ==
The book focuses on the practice of equestrianism in the ancient Mediterranean between the Bronze Age (c. 3300 – c. 1200 BCE) and the Islamic conquest of Spain in the 8th century CE. Anderson's primary source is the treatise On Horsemanship by the 4th century BCE Spartan general Xenophon, which he supplements with other sources of historical evidence, including archaeological artefacts and ancient art. Although the title of the book refers to Greece, it contains a significant amount of information about horsemanship in other parts of ancient Europe and the Middle East, including Persia, Rome, Egypt, Elam, Assyria and Gaul.

=== Contents ===
Chapter One discusses the arrival of horses in prehistoric Greece, while Chapter Two discusses different breeds of horses. On this topic, Anderson relies largely on William Ridgeway's The Origin and Influence of the Thoroughbred Horse (1905), although he disagrees with Ridgeway on some details.

Chapter Three, Four, Five, and Six discuss the historical development of horse tack, equipment for riding that includes halters, bridles and bits. Chapter Seven, Eight, Nine, Ten and Eleven are concerned with the training, upkeep, and economics of raising horses. Chapter Twelve concludes the book with a study of the equipment and tactics used by ancient cavalry. Throughout the book, Anderson builds the thesis that chariot driving preceded the introduction of horse riding.

The appendix includes a full translation of Xenophon's On Horsemanship. This translation is largely based on E. C. Marchant's edition of the Greek text, published in the Oxford Classical Texts series in 1920, although in several passages Anderson prefers to follow the Budé edition by Édouard Delebecque.

== Reception ==
The book received mostly positive reviews at the time of its publication. In the Classical Review, Irish classicist Benjamin Farrington wrote that "Here a horseman who is also a scholar has written an admirable book. Both the archaeological data and the ancient literary sources have been thoroughly combed." Farrington noted the book's clear layout and writing style, which made it accessible to general readers. L. A. Moritz, in Classical Philology, also praised "the manner in which [Anderson] has combined many-sidedness with thoroughness" and wrote that the book would be useful both to classicists and non-specialists.

French classicist François Chamoux praised Anderson's precision and use of evidence, but described the book as incomplete because it focused only on saddle horses and did not examine the history of draft horses and chariots. Chamoux wrote that this incomplete scope resulted in a distorted account of horsemanship in ancient Greece.

Leo Vincent Jacks, in a review for The Classical Journal, wrote that the book was "admirably presented and with a wealth of scholarship," noting that the topic "is treated as carefully as it would have been by an old-time California vaquero." S. D. Markman, writing for Archaeology, wrote that Anderson made "a novel and worthwhile contribution to our knowledge of the horse in the ancient world". He praised Anderson's treatment of horseriding equipment and military tactics, but felt that Anderson unfairly criticized equine historian William Ridgeway.

In a review in the Classical World, Charles John Milhauser praised the breadth of Anderson's research and described the book as "a must for any classical reference library". Although Milhauser found the writing style interesting, he criticized the lack of illustrations and diagrams, and described the layout of the book's footnotes, bibliography and plates as frustrating.

The book's success established Anderson's reputation as an expert in equestrian history. He addressed similar topics in his subsequent publications, including Military Theory and Practice in the Age of Xenophon (1970) and Hunting in the Ancient World (1985).

== See also ==
- Hunting in the Ancient World, 1985 book by Anderson
- On Horsemanship, 5th century BC treatise by Xenophon
- Hipparchicus, 5th century BC treatise by Xenophon
