= Pantea Arteshbod =

Achaemenid-era Persian female military commander

Pantea (fl. c. 539 BCE) is a character in the Cyropaedia, a work by the Greek historian Xenophon. Her story is one of the best-known romantic and tragic narratives in Greek literature concerning the East and the Iranian realm.

In some modern writings, she is referred to as Pantea Arteshbod ('arteshbod' translates to 'commander') and is described as an Iranian military commander or lieutenant serving in the army of Cyrus the Great. According to some modern accounts, she was recognized for her capable administration of Babylon following its conquest. These accounts also claim that she played a decisive role in the Battle of Opis in 539 BCE.

However, these claims are not supported by known ancient evidence. In particular, no known ancient source identifies Pantea as a military commander in the army of Cyrus. Her characterization as a commander therefore appears to derive from modern writings rather than from the ancient account of her in Xenophon's Cyropaedia.

One possible reason for the emergence of this claim is that, in Xenophon's account, Pantea is closely associated with military affairs. She is the wife of the lord of Susa (Abradatas), her husband joins Cyrus's army, she prepares his armor for battle, and ultimately his death becomes the central tragedy of the story. However, this is different from being a military commander.

In Xenophon's text, when military command is discussed, it is Abradatas who is presented in that role. He volunteers to confront the enemy, assumes command of his forces, and is killed in battle. Pantea has a different role throughout these events: she is portrayed as a devoted wife and as the emotional center of the story.

Women did participate in warfare in the ancient Iranian world, although the extent and nature of their military roles varied across different periods and sources. Artemisia I of Caria, who commanded a contingent of ships in the army of the Achaemenid king Xerxes I during the Greco-Persian Wars, is often cited as one of the prominent female military leaders associated with the Achaemenid Empire.

== In the Cyropaedia ==
According to the romantic narrative in Xenophon's Cyropaedia, a work concerning the life of Cyrus the Great, Pantea was the exceptionally beautiful wife of Abradatas, who is said to have been the lord of Susa (Books 5–7). The historicity of the characters and events in this account is uncertain.

According to Xenophon, Abradatas was an ally of the Assyrian king in the struggle against Cyrus. When Cyrus's forces captured the Assyrian camp, Pantea was among those taken captive. At the time, her husband was away on a diplomatic mission to the king of Bactria.

Seeing that Pantea's husband was absent, Cyrus placed her under the protection of his trusted associate Araspas. Araspas fell in love with Pantea, but she resisted his advances and reported the matter to Cyrus. Cyrus dealt with the matter appropriately, and his conduct pleased Pantea.

After Abradatas returned from his mission and learned of Cyrus's respectful and honorable treatment of his wife, he joined Cyrus's army.

During the campaign against Croesus, Abradatas was killed in battle. The historical conflict between Cyrus and Croesus is generally dated to around 541 BCE.

Grief-stricken by the death of her husband, Pantea took her own life with a dagger at his side. Her attendants also killed themselves.

Xenophon describes Cyrus as showing great respect for Pantea and Abradatas after their deaths and ordering a magnificent tomb to be constructed for them.
