= Military Theory and Practice in the Age of Xenophon =

1970 book by John Kinloch Anderson

- Cover of the 1970 Univ of California Press edition
- Author: John Kinloch Anderson
- Subject: Ancient Greek warfare
- Publisher: University of California Press
- Publication date: 1970
- Publication place: Berkeley and Los Angeles, California
- Pages: 427 (Note: This page count includes the eight-page introduction.)
- OCLC: 63909
- LC Class: 74-104010

Military Theory and Practice in the Age of Xenophon is a 1970 history book by John Kinloch Anderson, published by University of California Press. The book focuses on the training, organization and strategy employed by the Spartan army during the Classical period between the late 5th century and mid 4th century BC. It is primarily based on the writings of the Athenian-Spartan general Xenophon, citing both his non-fiction accounts and his semi-fictional Cyropaedia as evidence for Spartan military practices. Anderson supplements Xenophon's testimony with other literary and archaeological evidence for Classical Greek warfare.

The book had a mostly positive reception at the time of its publication. Reviews in academic journals praised the thoroughness of Anderson's research and the persuasiveness of his arguments, noting that the book was a substantial contribution to the field of Greek warfare, which was understudied at the time. Some reviewers came to criticize Anderson for not taking into account the possibility that Xenophon provided inaccurate information. The book had a lasting impact on the study of Greek warfare in the decades following its publication.

== Background ==
The book was written by John Kinloch Anderson, a Scottish classicist who moved to the United States and began teaching at University of California, Berkeley in 1958. Before studying ancient history, Anderson served as an officer in the Intelligence Corps and the Black Watch regiment of the British Army between 1942 and 1946; his experiences in World War II may have inspired his later interest in military history. He published extensively on the structure and equipment of infantry and cavalry in ancient Greece. In 1970, he published Military Theory and Practice in the Age of Xenophon, through University of California Press. The book combined several of Anderson's interests, including Greek vase painting and the writings of the Spartan general Xenophon.

== Summary ==
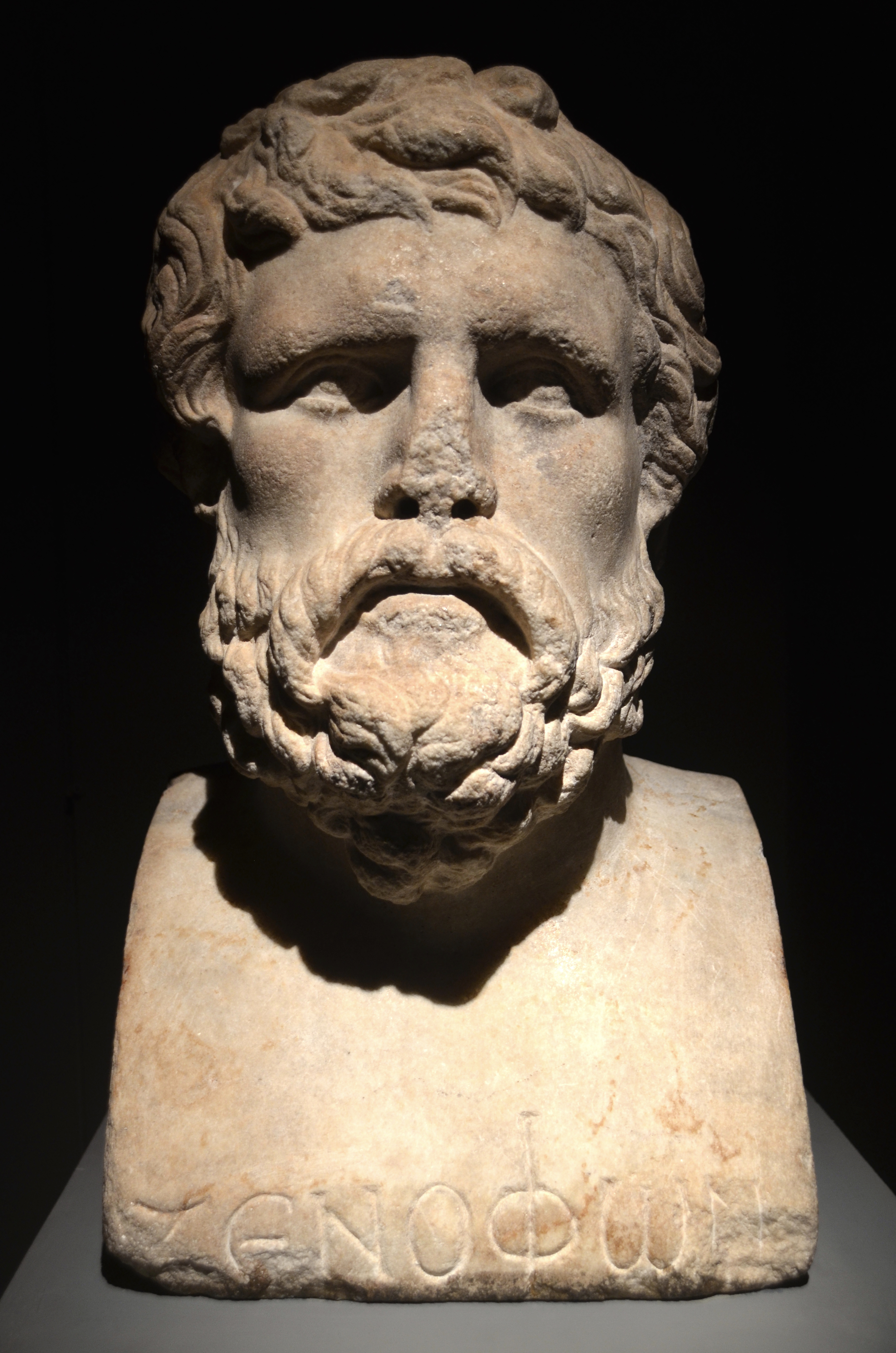
Posthumous bust of Xenophon, created c. AD 120

The book discusses ancient Greek warfare in the Classical period, particularly from the late 5th century BC until the Battle of Leuctra in 371 BC. It primarily deals with the technical aspects of the ancient Spartan army, including its organization, training, equipment, and strategy.

Anderson heavily relies on the testimony of Xenophon, who he describes as the "chief contemporary authority for the history of the fourth century B.C." He analyses the portrayal of Greek warfare in Xenophon's writings, such as the Anabasis and the Hellenica. Anderson also examines Xenophon's Cyropaedia, a fictionalized biography of the Persian king Cyrus the Great, which Anderson treats as both a fictional narrative and an instructional text on warfare. He describes the Cyropaedia as "the fullest statement of Xenophon's ideas on education". The testimony of Xenophon is supplemented by other ancient writers such as Herodotus, Thucydides, Demosthenes, Polybius, and Diodorus Siculus. Anderson also refers to representations of warfare in Ancient Greek art and studies of archaeological evidence.

=== Contents ===
After the introduction in the first chapter, Anderson discusses various aspects of the Spartan army, including "Hoplite Armour and Weapons" (chapter two), "Commissariat and Camps" (chapter three), "The General and his Officers" (chapter four), "Weapon Training" (chapter five) and "Tactical Training" (chapter six). Chapter seven "Hoplites and Other Arms" discusses the deployment of hoplites, a type of heavy infantry, along with other forces such as siege engines and light infantry known as peltasts. The final chapters deal with various battles from the Classical period, including "Hoplites Against Hoplites: From the Nemea to Tegyra" (chapter eight), "The Battle of Thymbra" (chapter nine), and "The Battle of Leuctra" (chapter ten), while the epilogue discusses the Battle of Mantinea in 362 BC.

== Reception ==
=== Contemporary reviews ===
At the time of its publication, the book received mostly positive reviews in academic journals. A review by L. B. L. in The Classical Outlook noted that the book was written in an interesting and approachable style that made it accessible to non-specialists, while still being informative for specialist readers. Robert Buck in The Classical Journal called it "an important and useful contribution to the understanding of Greek military tactics." Charles William John Eliot noted Anderson's thorough examination and persuasive analyses of literary and archaeological evidence. He wrote that the book's footnotes had not been properly proofread, describing the issue as "an unnecessary blemish in an otherwise commendable work by a scholar of exacting standards."

Wallace McLeod in The American Historical Review wrote that the book was "indispensable for all students of ancient warfare", and noted that "the biggest novelty in the book is Anderson's treatment of the Cyropaedia: he establishes that [...] it was evidently also intended as a military handbook." In a review for the journal Gnomon, Henry D. Westlake described Greek warfare as an under-researched topic and wrote that the book was an important contribution to the field. Westlake noted the thoroughness of Anderson's research and the sound basis for his conclusions, but noted numerous typographical errors. He also suggested that Anderson may not have fully accounted for potential inaccuracies, including unintentional omissions, in Xenophon's accounts.

Historian Chester G. Starr gave the book a largely positive appraisal and noted Anderson's thoroughness. However, he felt that the author did not adequately question Xenophon's credibility as a source and possibly went too far when using the Cyropaedia as evidence. A review by Y. B. in the Revue Archéologique wrote that Anderson presented many interesting ideas and observations, but that he had not cited or engaged with recent studies on Classical Greek warfare. The review also noted that while the Cyropaedia contained useful observations about the period, it also contained many elements that were fictionalized or potentially false. Classicist Herbert William Parke wrote that the book was a rare example of a detailed study of ancient Greek warfare written in English. He praised Anderson's use of archaeological evidence for hoplites and peltasts, but was not fully convinced by his analysis of the Cyropaedia, which Parke considered a "dangerous and difficult to appraise" source.

=== Retrospective assessment ===
In a 2014 article about Anderson, Russian classicist Alexander A. Sinitsyn wrote that the two decades following the book's publication were "the age of Anderson" in the study of ancient Greek warfare, because of its influence on scholars in the field. In the 2017 book Classical Greek Tactics: A Cultural History, Dutch classicist Roel Konijnendijk noted that the book's publication revived scholarly interest in Greek warfare in the United States. He stated that Anderson was a key figure in the establishment of the field in the United States in the 1960s and 1970s, and one of a few highly influential scholars from that generation whose publications are still widely used as general reference works. Konijnendijk was critical of Anderson's scholarship, which he considered to be derivative of flawed theories developed by earlier Prussian and English historians, including Wilhelm Rüstow and George Beardoe Grundy. (Note: For expanded information on Konijnendijk's criticism of these historians, see)
