= Xenophon (book) =

1974 book by John Kinloch Anderson

- Author: John Kinloch Anderson
- Publisher: Duckworth Books
- Publication date: 1974
- ISBN: 978-0-7156-0702-2

Xenophon is a 1974 history book by John Kinloch Anderson, published by Duckworth Books. The book is about the life and career of the ancient Athenian philosopher and general Xenophon.

== Background ==
In 1970, Anderson had published Military Theory and Practice in the Age of Xenophon, which was a more technical and detailed work about similar topics.

== Reception ==
American historian Chester G. Starr reviewed the book in the journal History: Reviews of New Books. British historian David Malcolm Lewis described the book as "a useful and elegant introduction to Xenophon's life and work".
