= Classical Greek Tactics: A Cultural History =

2018 non-fiction history book

- Cover of the first edition, showing the Grave Stele of Dexileos, made in 394 BCE
- Author: Roel Konijnendijk
- Subject: Ancient Greek warfare
- Publisher: Brill Publishers
- Publication date: 2018
- Publication place: Leiden
- ISBN: 978-90-04-35536-1

Classical Greek Tactics: A Cultural History is a 2018 non-fiction book by the Dutch historian Roel Konijnendijk, published by Brill Publishers. In the book, Konijnendijk argues that ancient Greek warfare has been misunderstood as a ritualised, honour-based affair, focused on combat between heavily armoured hoplites and the achievement of symbolic objectives. He traces the origin of this belief to nineteenth- and twentieth-century German military science, and argues that it does not reflect the ancient evidence. Instead, he constructs Greek warfare as predicated upon causing maximum casualties in the most efficient manner possible, using combined arms, tactics, strategy and pursuit to achieve this.

Classical Greek Tactics was widely praised, with reviewers commending its coherence, clarity, argumentation and use of evidence. Several considered it an important and useful contribution to the study of Greek warfare, and a means of advancing the discipline beyond outdated paradigms. Some reviewers questioned whether ancient literary sources, as used by Konijnendijk, gave a full picture of Greek warfare, while others suggested that Konijnendijk over-emphasised commanders' attempts to kill enemy soldiers at the expense of other political or strategic objectives.

== Synopsis ==
Classical Greek Tactics was written by Roel Konijnendijk based on his doctoral thesis, which was completed under Hans van Wees at University College London. In it, Konijnendijk reassesses ancient Greek warfare by examining literary evidence from the fifth and fourth centuries BCE. He constructs what he calls the "traditional" view of Greek warfare before the Peloponnesian War of the late fifth century BCE, which sees warfare as primarily carried out in a ritualistic, agonistic fashion for motives of honour and prestige; as primarily focused upon clashes between armoured heavy infantry known as hoplites; and as conducted with little regard for strategy, tactics or deception. Konijnendijk argues that this view has little basis in primary sources from the ancient Greek world, and is largely a construct of nineteenth- and twentieth-century military science theory from German literature, particularly from the Kingdom of Prussia. He considers this group of scholars, whom he terms "the Prussians", to have written about Greek warfare largely as a means to illustrate contemporary military ideas from their own period, relying more on their own experience of military service than ancient evidence.

Against this view, Konijnendijk argues that Greek warfare was driven by the desire to "destroy the enemy in a ruthless display of military power ... at minimal risk to the militia army that city-states relied on to fight their battles". Successive chapters discuss the comparatively low amount of military training afforded to classical Greek warriors, who were mostly untrained citizen-soldiers that served only in times of war; the strategic concerns shown by Greek commanders around choosing a battlefield; the development of military formations and the use of combined arms between hoplites, lighter infantry such as peltasts, and cavalry; the use of tactics and specialist troops to generate an advantage; and the importance of pursuit and mass killing during a rout, which was carried out in preference to more symbolic actions such as setting up a tropaion or victory monument.

== Reception ==
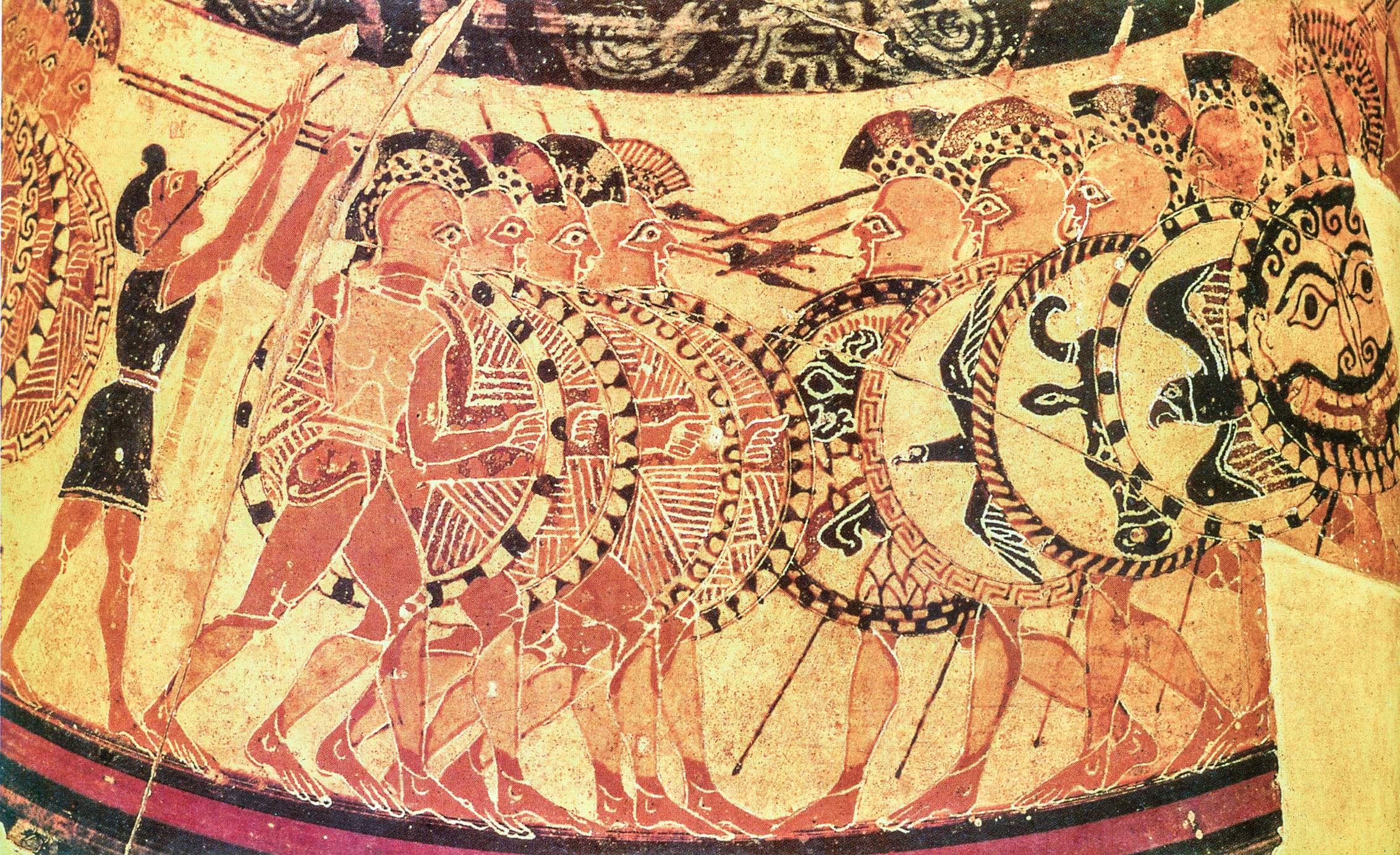
Hoplites battle on the ancient Greek Chigi vase, made around 645 BCE

Classical Greek Tactics received a mostly positive reception in academic journals. Fernando Echeverría, in The Classical Review, called it an extremely useful contribution to the study of ancient Greek tactics, which he characterised as a previously outdated and "deliberately stunted" field. Kyle Fingerson, writing for the Bryn Mawr Classical Review, called it "a much-needed reevaluation of the traditional views of classical Greek warfare", and recommended that it be used in future studies of the subject, calling its argument persuasive and convincing. It received similar praise from Kostas Vlassopoulos in Greece & Rome, who wrote that the book opens avenues for research into how the tactical system described by Konijnendijk developed from the less formalised warfare of the Archaic period, and into the reasons for which Greek states fought battles.

Pavel Nývlt, in Eirene: Studia Graeca et Latina, praised the book's coherence, argumentation, and use of evidence, though argued that Konijnendijk had improperly used the absence of evidence in literary sources to argue for the non-existence of Spartan weapon-training, and that he had overemphasised the vulnerability of hoplites against light troops. Nývlt called the book "certainly one of the most valuable additions to modern reconstructions of ancient Greek warfare". In a review for The Classical Journal, Edith Foster praised the book's examination of classical scholarship, saying that it was "clear and well-organized", though suggested that Konijnendijk had placed too much emphasis upon the killing of enemy troops as the sole aim of a Greek battle, as opposed to other strategic and political objectives.

== Works cited ==
- Echeverría, Fernando (2018). "Review: Greek Battle Tactics". The Classical Review. 68 (2): 477–479. JSTOR 26796322.
- Fingerson, Kyle (2018). "Review of: Classical Greek Tactics: A Cultural History". Bryn Mawr Classical Review. ISSN 1055-7660.
- Foster, Edith (December 2, 2018). "Book Review: Classical Greek Tactics: A Cultural History" (PDF). The Classical Journal Online.
- Konijnendijk, Roel (2018). Classical Greek Tactics: A Cultural History. Leiden: Brill. ISBN 978-90-04-35557-6.
- Nývlt, Pavel (2020). "(Review) R. Konijnendijk: Classical Greek Tactics". Eirene: Studia Graeca et Latina. 56 (1–2): 335–340.
- Vlassopoulos, Kostas (October 2018). "Greek History". Greece & Rome. 65 (2): 253–259. doi:10.1017/S0017383518000190. ISSN 0017-3835. S2CID 232179261.
