= The Wrath of Homer =

1948 book by Louis Alexander MacKay

- Author: Louis Alexander MacKay
- Language: English
- Subject: The Iliad
- Genre: Homeric scholarship
- Publisher: University of Toronto Press
- Publication date: 1948
- Publication place: Toronto
- Pages: 140 (Note: This page count includes the nine page introduction.)
- OCLC: 1210889

The Wrath of Homer is a 1948 book by Canadian-American classicist and poet Louis Alexander MacKay, published by University of Toronto Press. The book focuses on the historical basis, origins, and structure of the Iliad, an ancient Greek epic. It was MacKay's first nonfiction book and was published after he received a Guggenheim Fellowship to study the Iliad.

MacKay argues that the Iliad is based on two distinct legendary traditions: a Trojan War cycle about Agamemnon, and a revenge narrative about Achilles that originated in Epirus. He theorizes that these legendary traditions were combined into a single epic based on the theme of wrath by Homer, an 8th century BC Ionian poet. MacKay cites archaeological evidence for his representation of Mycenae during the Bronze Age and the historical background of the Trojan War, while his proposed origin for the Iliad as a combination of separate legends is based on structural and textual analysis of the epic.

The book received mixed reviews at the time of its publication. Some reviewers praised MacKay's presentation of the historical background of the Trojan War, his use of archaeological evidence, and his structural analysis of the Iliad. Other reviewers criticized his claims about the Iliad's purported origin in Epirote legend and felt that the textual evidence used to support this theory was unconvincing.

== Background ==
The book was written by Louis Alexander MacKay, a classicist and poet who graduated from the University of Toronto in 1924 and from Balliol College, Oxford, in 1928. He taught at the University of Toronto until 1941, when he became assistant professor of classics at the University of British Columbia. In 1945, he was awarded a Guggenheim Fellowship for his research into the structure and composition of the Iliad, a Greek epic poem. In 1948, he published his first nonfiction book, The Wrath of Homer, (Note: MacKay published the poetry chapbook Viper's Bugloss in 1938.) through University of Toronto Press.

== Summary ==
The book's central argument concerns the origin of the Iliad, the context in which it was created, and the identity of Homer, the figure credited with creating the epic. These topics are all aspects of the "Homeric Question", a longstanding philological and historical debate in Homeric scholarship about the origins of the Iliad and the Odyssey, a related epic poem that is also attributed to Homer. In the mid 19th century, German scholars such as Karl Lachmann and Gregor Wilhelm Nitzsch proposed that the Iliad was a composite of originally unrelated poems that had been combined and improved by Homer. In The Wrath of Homer, MacKay presents a variation on this theory.

MacKay argues that Homer, who he identifies as an 8th century BC Ionian poet, combined two separate legendary cycles to create the Iliad, a single epic based upon the theme of wrath. According to MacKay, one of these original legendary cycles was about the Mycenaean king Agamemnon leading an assault on Troy during the Trojan War, and the other was about Achilles's conflict with Hector. He considers the Trojan War cycle to be based on historical fact, while describing the Achillean cycle as potentially mythological. MacKay introduces the argument that the Achillean legendary tradition originated in Epirus and other adjoining regions of northwestern Greece.

=== Contents ===
The book is divided into three chapters. The first chapter is titled "The Historical Background" and is concerned with the historical background of the Trojan War; this chapter is largely based on archaeological evidence from Middle Bronze Age Europe (c. 2000 BC). The second chapter, titled "The Heroic Legends", examines the origins of the legendary traditions that inspired the Iliad. The third and final chapter is titled "The Structure and Composition of the Iliad", and deals with that subject.

In the first part, MacKay argues that Mycenae's wealth and power in the Bronze Age was derived from commerce rather than piracy, owing to its status as an intermediary for trade from mainland Greece to Crete and Egypt. He theorized that this trade extended to the Danube basin, which exported iron to Mycenae, and that Troy benefited from a separate trade route to the Danube. He cites economic competition as the origin of the rivalry between Mycenae and Troy, while noting that the abduction of Menelaus's wife Helen by the Trojans as described in the Iliad may still have been the direct cause of the Trojan War.

In the second part of the book, MacKay examines the toponyms and ethnonyms used in the Iliad, determining that many of the names are related to places and ethnic groups in northwestern Greece, specifically Epirus. MacKay argues that this region is where the legendary tradition related to Achilles originated, and that the original version of the story involved a conflict between two villages in Epirus. In this original version, Achilles's friend Patroclus was killed during a conflict with a rival town in Epirus that was ruled by the brothers Hector and Alexander (Paris), and the rest of the story pertained to Achilles's quest for revenge.

In the third section of the book, MacKay focuses on the structure and composition of the Iliad. In this section, he notes that the theme of Achilles's wrath appears to break up the action of the Iliad, which he argues is a consequence of the poet inserting the theme into a narrative that did not originally include it.

== Reception ==
The book was considered unorthodox at the time of its publication. Classicist William Bedell Stanford praised MacKay's analysis of the historical background of the Trojan War and of the Iliad's structure. However, he criticized MacKay's methodology in the second part of the book, and felt that MacKay did not convincingly argue that certain legendary traditions originated in western Greece. Albert Severyns, in his review of the book in L'Antiquité Classique, praised the book's analysis of the Iliad's structure and composition, while writing that he disagreed with MacKay's theory about the origins of the Iliad's legendary tradition. Severyns observed that MacKay's background as a poet influenced his approach to the Iliad, and in Severyns's view improved his ability to analyse and appreciate Homer's genius.

Hilda Lorimer found MacKay's central arguments to be unconvincing, including his arguments about the significance of the double-names used in the Iliad. She also disagreed with MacKay's speculation that Mycenae grew wealthy by importing iron from central Europe, citing archaeological and historical evidence that the Hittites controlled the only sources of iron in the Bronze Age. Lorimer felt that the most persuasive part of the book was MacKay's examination of ethnic names and place names in the Iliad and their connection to northwestern Greece. W. F. Clark gave the book a mixed review in The Classical Journal, writing that MacKay diligently argued for his theory but did not completely avoid the tendency of researchers to distort evidence to support "an attractive thesis."

Art historian Rhys Carpenter gave the book a positive review, writing that MacKay ingeniously combined disparate threads of argument based on archaeology, linguistics, and textual analysis into a single theory. A review by K. G. in the Classical Outlook described the book as a strong addition to the field of Homeric studies, praising its discussion of archaeological and linguistic evidence, while arguing that its least persuasive aspect was MacKay's claims about the Iliad's connection to Epirus. Donald Blythe Durham praised MacKay's "sprightly" style, his presentation of Mycenae as a commercial power, and his justification of Achilles's behavior in the Iliad, while criticizing the grammatical choices and typographical errors present in the book.
