= Historia: Zeitschrift für Alte Geschichte =

- Discipline: Classical history
- Language: English, German, French, Italian
- Edited by: Kai Brodersen, Walter Scheidel, Hans van Wees, Mischa Meier, Bernhard Linke

Publication details
- History: 1952–present
- Publisher: Franz Steiner Verlag
- Frequency: Quarterly

Standard abbreviations
- ISO 4: Historia

Indexing
- ISSN: 0018-2311
- OCLC no.: 5230783
- Special issues: Historia Einzelschriften
- ISSN: 0341-0056

Links
- Journal homepage; Tables of contents

Historia: Zeitschrift für Alte Geschichte is a peer-reviewed academic journal specialising in Greek and Roman antiquity. It was established in 1952 by Karl Friedrich Stroheker and Gerold Walser. Hildegard Temporini-Gräfin Vitzthum was a member of its editorial staff. In 2019, the editors-in-chief were Kai Brodersen, Hans van Wees, Walter Scheidel, Bernhard Linke, and Mischa Meier. It is published quarterly by Franz Steiner Verlag. It is ranked as an "A"-journal for "History" in the European Reference Index for the Humanities of the European Science Foundation, in the "Ranked Journal List" of the Australian Research Council, and in other journal rankings.

Since 1956, it is supplemented by a series of monographs, the renowned "Historia Einzelschriften".
