= Nandini Pandey =

Classicist

Nandini Pandey is Associate Professor of Classics at the Johns Hopkins University, after teaching from 2014-2021 at the University of Wisconsin-Madison. She is an expert on the literature, culture, history, and reception of early imperial Rome.

== Education ==
Pandey received a BA from Swarthmore College, and a BA in Classics and English from Oxford University. She was awarded an M.Phil in Renaissance English from Cambridge University, and an MA and PhD in Classics from the University of California, Berkeley. Her doctoral thesis was Empire of the Imagination: The Power of Public Fictions in Ovid's 'Reader Response' to Augustan Rome.

== Career ==
Pandey's first monograph, The Poetics of Power in Augustan Rome: Latin Poetic Responses to Early Imperial Iconography, was published by Cambridge University Press in 2018. It won the Classical Association of the Midwest and South First Book Prize in 2020. Prize committee members described the book as 'stunningly smart' and 'impressive in its depth, breadth and ambition'. She received a Fellowship from the American Council of Learned Societies for her second book on Roman race and diversity, Diversitas: Negotiating Ethnic Difference in Imperial Rome (under contract with Princeton University Press). The book aims to write a new chapter in the history of diversity and promotes critical reexamination of modern discourse on race.

Pandey was the Nina Maria Gorrissen Fellow in History at the American Academy in Berlin, and is currently a Basel Fellow in Latin Literature at the University of Basel. After seven years as an Associate Professor of Classics at the University of Wisconsin-Madison, Pandey took up a new position at the Johns Hopkins University in January 2022.

Pandey has written for a wide range of public-facing media institutions, including Hyperallergic, Medium and Eidolon, where she wrote the column 'Romans Go Home'.

== Select Awards ==
- Pedagogy Award, Society for Classical Studies
- Teaching Innovation Grant, Johns Hopkins University
- Global Fellowship, University of St Andrews
- Basel Fellowship in Latin Literature
- American Academy in Berlin Fellowship
- First Book Award, Classical Association of the Midwest and South (CAMWS)
- American Council of Learned Societies (ACLS) Fellowship
- Hugh le May Senior Research Fellowship, Rhodes University, South Africa
- Loeb Classical Library Foundation Fellowship
