= Hunting in the Ancient World =

1985 book by John Kinloch Anderson

- Author: John Kinloch Anderson
- Subject: Hunting practices
- Genre: History
- Publisher: University of California Press
- Publication date: 1985
- Publication place: Berkeley and Los Angeles
- ISBN: 978-0-520-05197-3

Hunting in the Ancient World is a 1985 history book by John Kinloch Anderson.

== Background ==
The book was the last monograph published by Scottish classicist John Kinloch Anderson. It built on some of the topics he had begun exploring in his first book, Ancient Greek Horsemanship (1961).

== Summary ==
The book provides an overview of hunting practices in Classical Greece and Rome. It draws on artistic and literary evidence from the Greco-Roman world, as well as evidence from other ancient cultures like the Persian Empire and Assyria.

== Reception ==
J. M. Croisille, in the journal Latomus, praised Anderson's detailed analysis of relevant texts and artworks, while noting the brevity of the book. Donald G. Kyle in the Journal of Sport History wrote that "this work is authoritative because of Anderson's scholarship and range as a classicist, archaeologist, and horseman."
