= Ronald M. James =

American folklorist and historian

- Born: 1955 (age 70–71); Reno, Nevada
- Spouse: Susan (m. 1984)
- Children: 1

Academic background
- Education: University of Nevada, Reno (BA) and MA); University College, Dublin (I. T. T. Fellowship)

Academic work
- Discipline: Folklorist and historian
- Institutions: University of Nevada, Reno (1979–2011); Nevada State Historic Preservation Office (1983–2012)

Ronald M. James (born 1955) is an American folklorist and historian from Reno, Nevada. He lectured on history and folklore at the University of Nevada, Reno from 1979 until 2011, and was head of the Nevada State Historic Preservation Office from 1983 until 2012. James has published numerous books and articles on history and folklore.

== Early life and education ==
Ronald M. James was born at St. Mary's Hospital in Reno, Nevada, in 1955. His father, who was a police officer, died when James was a child. He played in the rock band Jericho while attending Reno High School.

James attended the University of Nevada, Reno where he obtained a dual bachelor's degree in anthropology and history in 1978, with minors in English and psychology. While at the university, he was mentored by Swedish folklorist Sven S. Liljeblad. James later called Liljeblad "one of the last great folklorists". In 1981, James received a Master of Arts degree in medieval history from University of Nevada, Reno.

He subsequently studied at the Irish Department of Folklore at University College, Dublin, and was an I.T.T fellow studying folklore from 1981 until 1982. While studying in Dublin, he taught himself the local brogue because he felt that his American accent separated him from the locals. In 1984, he married Susan, with whom he has a son named Reed.

== Career ==
James lectured on history, historic preservation, and folklore at University of Nevada, Reno from 1979 to 2011. He was the head of the Nevada State Historic Preservation Office from 1983 until 2012. In 1991, he organized the Commission for Cultural Affairs, overseeing the restoration of historic buildings for use as cultural centers. Between 2004 and 2013, James was chairman of the National Historic Landmarks Committee. He was appointed to the National Park System Advisory Board as historian and folklorist in 2010. He was also executive director of the Comstock Foundation for History and Culture from 2013 until 2015.

James has written or co-written 18 books, about the architectural history of Nevada, the history of Virginia City, and European and American folklore. He authored over 100 entries in the Online Nevada Encyclopedia and was a board member and manuscript referee for the The Western Historical Quarterly. He published The Roar and the Silence: A History of Virginia City and the Comstock Lode in 1998. In 2012, he wrote Virginia City: Secrets of a Western Past. In 2014, he published A Short History of Virginia City with Susan A. James. James is also a contributor to R/AskHistorians.

=== The Folklore of Cornwall ===
He wrote the The Folklore of Cornwall: The Oral Tradition of a Celtic Nation in 2018. The book is a study of 19th century Cornish folklore, focusing on both its unique features and its interconnections with other cultures. Elissa Henken, in the Journal of Folklore Research Reviews, called it "a gift to Cornish studies, an easy-to-read, scholarly work, which provides historic and theoretic perspective along with its valuable body of cultural information." Writing for the The Irish Times, Seaghan Mac an tSionnaigh called it "an apt introduction both to Cornwall and to folklore". The book was a finalist for The Folklore Society's 2019 Katharine Briggs Award.

=== Monumental Lies ===
In 2023, James published Monumental Lies: Early Nevada Folklore of the Wild West. He credited his college mentor Sven S. Liljeblad with influencing the book. Mark Maynard of the Nevada Historical Society praised the book, writing that "The hard work the author has done to find, categorize, and make sense of these localized stories is too important to be ignored."

== Legacy ==
James was inducted into the Nevada Writers Hall of Fame in 2014, and he received the 2015 Rodman Paul Award from the Mining History Association. In 2016, he was elected a bard of the Gorsedh Kernow, for his contributions to the study of Cornish folklore and immigration.

The "Ronald M. James Papers" in the special collections department of the University of Nevada, Reno contains research materials from five books written by James between 1992 and 2019. These books largely deal with Nevada history, including the history of the Comstock Lode.
