= Louis Alexander MacKay =

Canadian-American classicist and poet (1901–1982)

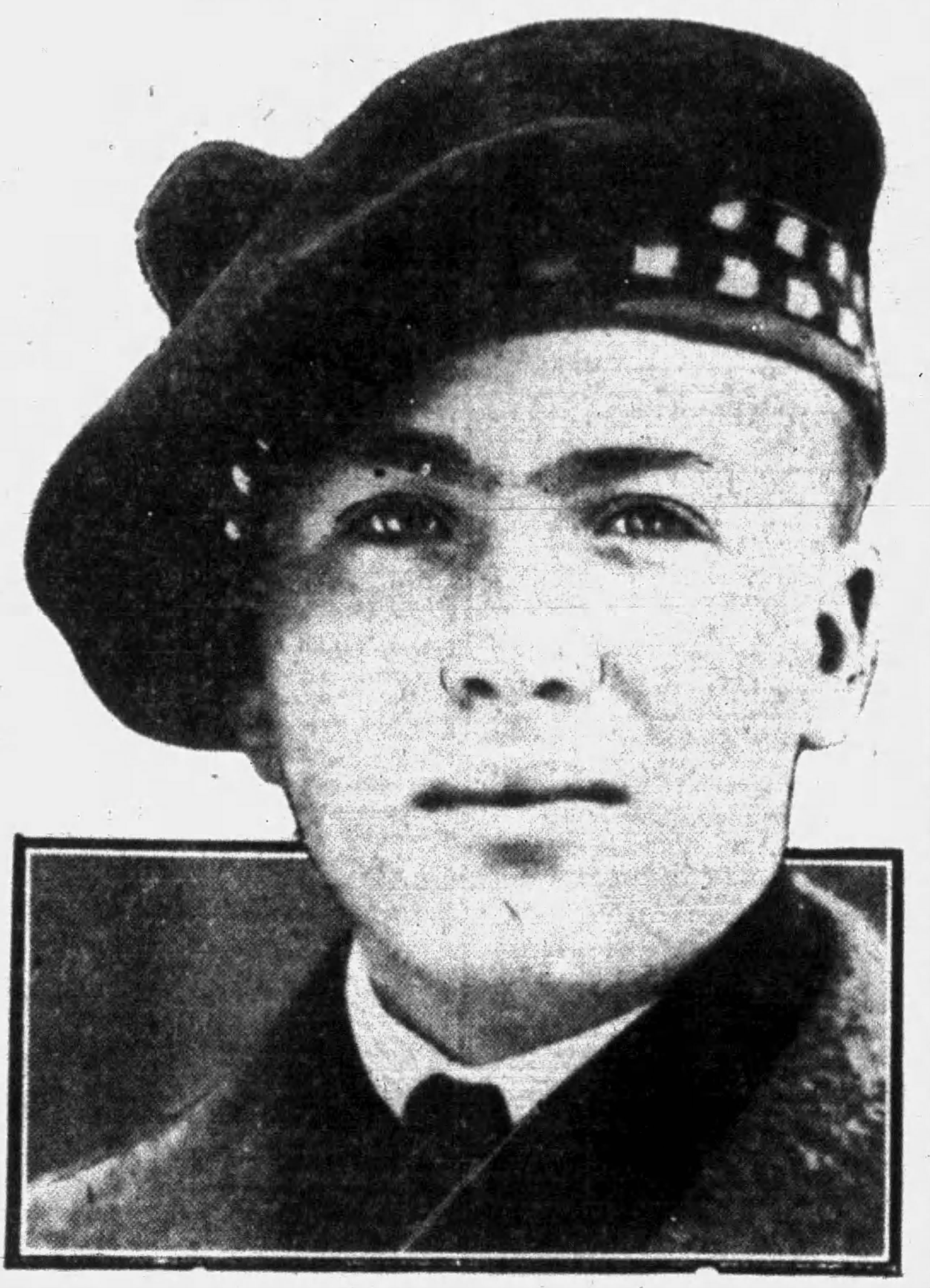
- MacKay c. 1923
- Born: February 27, 1901; Hensall, Ontario, Canada
- Died: June 24, 1982 (aged 81); Berkeley, California, US
- Other name: John Smalacombe (pen name)
- Occupations: Classicist and poet
- Spouse: Constance Charlesworth (m. 1928)
- Children: 2
- Awards: Guggenheim Fellowship (1945)

Academic background
- Education: University of Toronto (BA and MA); Balliol College, Oxford (BA and MA)

Academic work
- Discipline: Classicist
- Sub-discipline: Latin poetry
- Institutions: University of Toronto (1928–1941); University of British Columbia (1941–1948); University of California, Berkeley (1948–1968)
- Notable students: John Kinloch Anderson
- Notable works: The Wrath of Homer (1948); The Ill-Tempered Lover and Other Poems (1948)

Louis Alexander MacKay (February 27, 1901 – June 24, 1982) was a Canadian-American classicist and Modernist poet. He used the pen name John Smalacombe on some of his English poetry. His most significant scholarly work was related to the study of Latin poetry, although he also studied ancient Greek literature. He received a Guggenheim Fellowship in 1945 for researching the Iliad, and published a book about the Iliad titled The Wrath of Homer in 1948.

MacKay was born in Hensall, Ontario, and graduated from the University of Toronto in 1924 with a bachelor of arts and master of arts degree in classics. He studied at Balliol College, Oxford on a Rhodes Scholarship, where he received a Bachelor of Arts degree in literae humaniores in 1928 and a Master of Arts degree in 1948.

He taught Latin at the University of Toronto from 1928 to 1941, and at the University of British Columbia from 1941 until 1948. While teaching classics, MacKay published two chapbooks of poetry and contributed poems to magazines and anthologies. In 1948 he became a professor of Latin at the University of California, Berkeley, and he chaired the university's classics department from 1949 to 1953. MacKay spent the remainder of his life in California and became a naturalized citizen of the United States in 1954.

MacKay was president of the American Philological Association from 1959 to 1960, and chaired the association in 1965. He wrote hundreds of articles about Latin and Greek poetry. After retiring from full-time teaching in 1968, he taught workshops at the University of California and held visiting professorships at other universities before his death in 1982.

== Early life and education ==
Louis Alexander MacKay was born in Hensall, Ontario, on February 27, 1901, the son of William MacKay and Martha Elme (née Smallacombe). He was an Anglican. He attended Hensall Public School from 1907 until 1914 and the Clinton Collegiate Institute between 1914 and 1919. He also studied at Guelph Collegiate Institute in 1918.

MacKay received his bachelor of arts degree in classics from the University of Toronto in 1923, followed by a master of arts degree in 1924. He was a successful student playwright at University of Toronto and two of his plays were produced, including one written in French. MacKay also contributed to Vincent Massey's Canadian Plays from Hart House Theatre: Volume 2 (1927). He was a lecturer in classics at Victoria College, University of Toronto, between 1923 and 1925.

MacKay went to Balliol College, Oxford, on a Rhodes Scholarship in 1924. He earned a Bachelor of Arts degree in literae humaniores at Oxford in 1928. He married Constance Charlesworth on June 29, 1928. They had two children, Pierre, born February 19, 1933, and Katherine Camilla Anne, born November 2, 1935. MacKay later earned a Master of Arts degree from Balliol College in 1948.

== Career ==
=== University College, Toronto and University of British Columbia ===
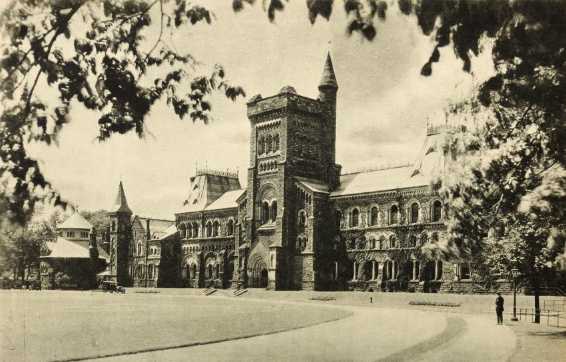
Main building of the University of Toronto, photographed in 1930

Between 1928 and 1941, MacKay taught Latin at the University of Toronto. He lectured at University College, Toronto from 1928 until 1932, when he became an assistant professor. In 1941, he took up a post as assistant professor of Latin at the University of British Columbia. He received a Guggenheim Fellowship in 1945 for his research on the structure and composition of the Iliad, an ancient Greek epic poem. In 1948, he became full professor of classics at the University of British Columbia.

He published the critical work The Wrath of Homer in 1948 through University of Toronto Press. In the book, MacKay argues that the Iliad was based on two originally unconnected legendary cycles: a saga about Agamemnon's sack of Troy during the Trojan War and a separate legend from western Greece about the hero Achilles. According to MacKay, these unconnected legends were combined into a single epic poem about the theme of wrath by Homer, whom he identifies as an Ionian poet who lived during the 8th century BC. The book was considered unorthodox at the time of its publication. Contemporary reviews in academic journals were mixed, with some reviewers praising MacKay's knowledge of archaeological and linguistic evidence, and others writing that his arguments were unconvincing and lacked sufficient evidence. Some reviewers praised aspects of MacKay's structural analysis of the Iliad, while remaining unconvinced by his claims about the poem's origin.

=== Poetry ===
While teaching in Canada, MacKay became established as a poet. Between 1932 and 1935, he was an associate editor of the magazine Canadian Forum. He wrote poems, reviews, and essays throughout the Great Depression period of the 1930s. His work was published in literary magazines like Canadian Forum, Saturday Night, Canadian Poetry, Poetry, Northern Review, and the Canadian Review of Music and Art. MacKay published his first chapbook of poetry under the pen name John Smalacombe. The book, titled Viper's Bugloss, was published through Ryerson Press in 1938. MacKay also contributed to the Canadian magazine Contemporary Verse in the 1940s.

MacKay wrote Modernist poetry, which was influenced by contemporary developments in English and American poetry. He was heavily influenced by classical poetry, including the epigrammatic style of the Roman poet Martial, and wrote some poems in Latin. Literary scholar Brian Trehearne suggested that MacKay was influenced by Irish writer Oscar Wilde on the basis of similarities between their poetry and critical writing. Describing the varied influences that shaped MacKay's poetry, Trehearne wrote that "In MacKay, the classical tendency is mitigated by a dissonant tendency towards Aestheticism; the irresolution of the two is apparent in a number of his poems." His work was characterized by satire, paradoxes, and verbal irony. In 1941, literary critic E. K. Brown called him Canada's "most angry and clever satirist", and noted that much of his work was richly descriptive.

In 1942, some of MacKay's poetry was published in Ralph Gustafson's Anthology of Canadian Poetry. Anthologist and poet A. J. M. Smith helped to establish MacKay's literary reputation by praising his satirical and descriptive abilities in the Book of Canadian Poetry (1943). In Trehearne's estimation, MacKay's work was "neither so substantial nor so distinctive as to guarantee the poet his place in literary history" without Smith's influence. MacKay published his second and best known chapbook, The Ill-Tempered Lover and Other Poems, through Macmillan Publishers in 1948. Unlike his first chapbook, The Ill-Tempered Lover was published under his birth name. An article published that year called him one of the best Anglo-Canadian poets of his generation. He had stopped writing poetry by 1955, and Trehearne suggested that his abandonment of writing prevented him from fully developing his voice and style.

MacKay's poetry has appeared in numerous anthologies, including Ira Dilworth's Twentieth Century Verse (1945), A. J. M. Smith's The Worldly Muse (1951), Henry W. Wells' One Thousand and One Poems of Mankind (1953), Bliss Carman's Canadian Poetry in English (1954), F. R. Scott and A. J. M. Smith's The Blasted Pine (1957), Oscar Williams' The Silver Treasury of Light Verse (1957), and Ralph Gustafson's The Penguin Book of Canadian Verse (1967). He was posthumously included in the New Canadian Library's 2010 anthology Canadian Poetry: 1920 to 1960, a selection of poets whose work represents the Modernizing period in Canadian poetry between the end of World War I in 1918 and 1960.

=== University of California, Berkeley ===
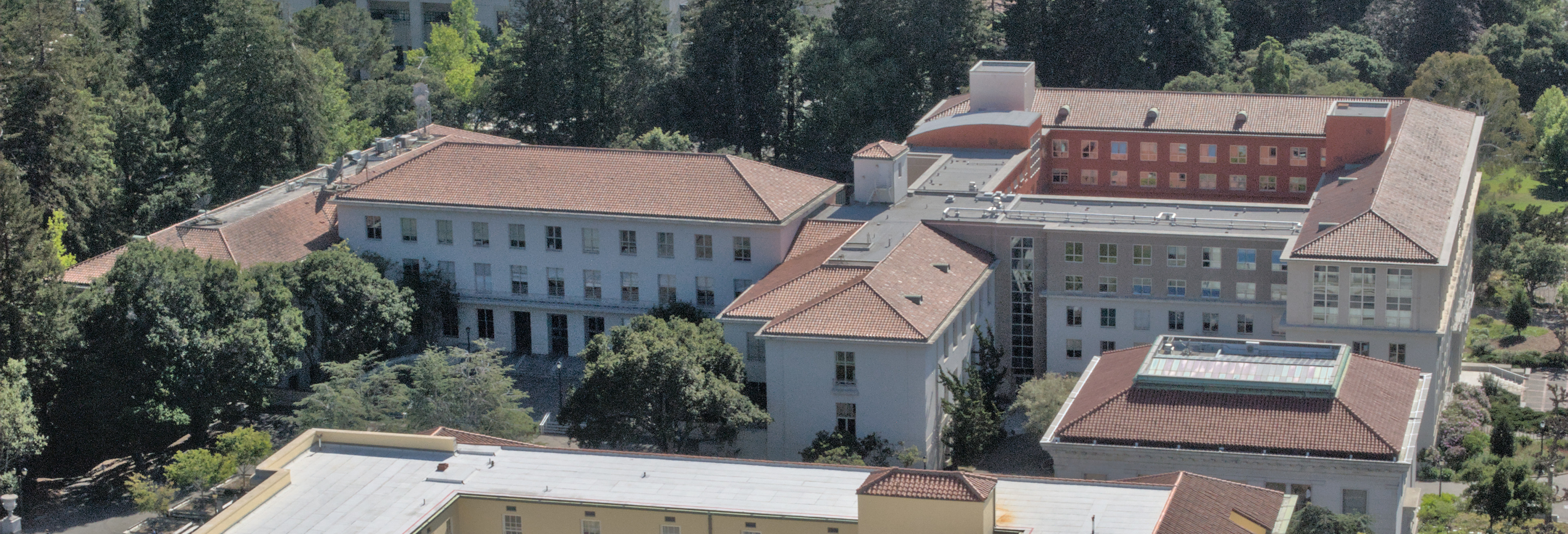
MacKay taught in the University of California, Berkeley's classics department, located in Dwinelle Hall (pictured).

In 1948, MacKay left the University of British Columbia to become professor of Latin at the University of California, Berkeley. After moving to the United States, he focused on the study of Latin literature, especially Roman poetry. Following the publication of The Wrath of Homer, MacKay mostly wrote articles instead of books or monographs, and the majority of his publications focused on minor literary and textual issues in Latin and Greek poetry. By the end of his life, MacKay estimated that he had published hundreds of articles. He published two philological books through University of California Press, Notes on Lucretius in 1950 and Janus in 1956. An obituary published by the University of California wrote that his academic writing was noted for being imaginative and containing a "rather naughty sense of humor and common-sense practicality".

MacKay was the chair of the Classics Department at the University of California, Berkeley, from 1949 to 1953. He became a naturalized United States citizen in 1954. MacKay was president of the American Philological Association from 1959 to 1960, and chairman of the association in 1965. In the early 1960s, he founded the Berkeley Greek Club, a symposium for members to discuss and translate Greek literature. He mentored British classicist John Kinloch Anderson, who joined Berkeley's faculty in 1958 and was a founding member of the Berkeley Greek Club. Anderson credited MacKay with helping to shape his later ideas. MacKay retired in 1968, retaining the title of professor of Latin emeritus.

== Retirement and death ==
After his retirement, MacKay traveled in Europe and the United States, but continued to teach Latin workshops at the University of California, Berkeley. He was recalled twice at the request of graduate students to teach a course in Latin verse composition at Berkeley. He was visiting professor at the University of Toronto from 1968 to 1969 and at the University of Washington in 1970. He died in Berkeley, California, on June 24, 1982.

== Publications ==
=== Poetry ===
- (as John Smalacombe) Viper's Bugloss. Whitby, Ontario: Ryerson Press. 1938. OCLC 609677810.
- The Ill-Tempered Lover and Other Poems. London: MacMillan Publishers. 1948. OCLC 561677002.

=== Philology ===
- The Wrath of Homer. Toronto: University of Toronto Press. 1948. OCLC 1210889.
- Notes On Lucretius. Berkeley: University of California Press. 1950. OCLC 3862307.
- Janus. Berkeley: University of California Press. 1956. OCLC 907611285.
