= Araspes =

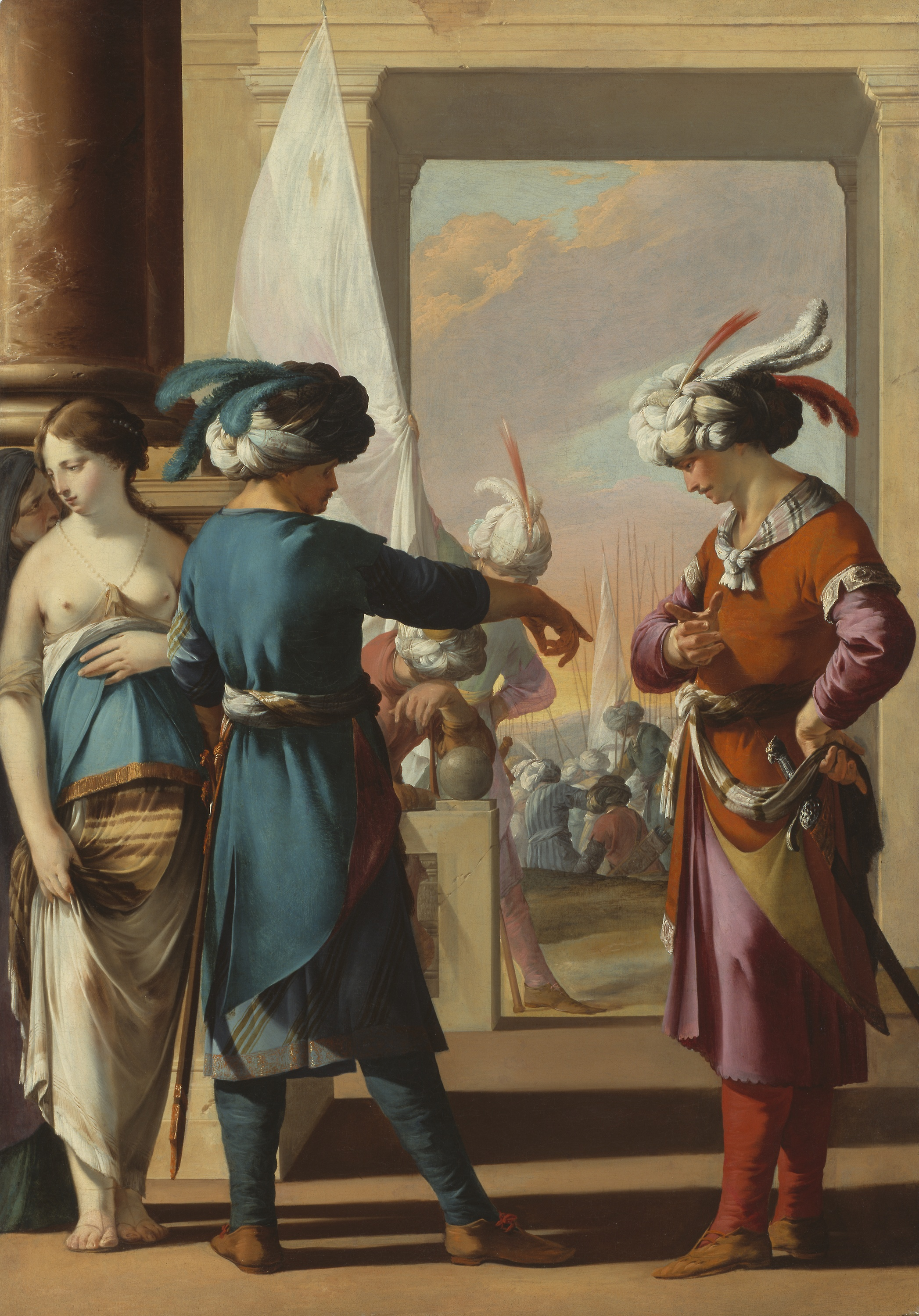
Panthea, Cyrus, and Araspas, 1630s painting by Laurent de La Hyre

Araspus (Ancient Greek: Ἀράσπης), a Mede, and a friend of Cyrus the Great from his youth, contends with Cyrus that love has no power over him, but shortly afterwards refutes himself by falling in love with Pantheia, whom Cyrus had committed to his charge. He is afterwards sent to Croesus as a deserter, to inspect the condition of the enemy, and subsequently commands the right wing of Cyrus's army in the battle with Croesus.
