= R/AskHistorians =

History forum on Reddit

r/AskHistorians
- Website type: Subreddit, Question-and-answer site
- Available in: English
- Founded: August 28, 2011; 14 years ago
- Founder: u/Artrw
- Website: www.reddit.com/r/AskHistorians
- Users: 2.5 million members

r/AskHistorians is a subreddit on Reddit where users may ask questions about history. It is one of the internet's largest history forums.

The subreddit was founded in 2011 and has remained active ever since, with over 2.7 million subscribers as of April 19, 2026. It aims to "provide serious, academic-level answers to questions about history" and is strictly moderated. Therefore, discussions not directly pertaining to the question being asked are routinely removed by the moderators.

== History ==
r/AskHistorians was founded August 28, 2011, as a question and answer forum for sharing historical knowledge. It grew to be one of the largest online history forums. The site's rules state that all answers must be serious and based in reliable academic sources, and regular contributors who demonstrate an expert level of knowledge in their field are given a "flair" which displays their expertise next to their username. Although many of AskHistorians' contributors are professional historians, anyone is allowed to contribute to the site provided that they produce answers that meet AskHistorians' standards. Scholars Roel Konijnendijk, Mike Dash, Cassidy Percoco, Ronald M. James, and Alex Wellerstein are regular contributors to AskHistorians.

AskHistorians has received praise for its commitment to unbiased and well-sourced history, and for making academic history accessible to a broad audience, with the American Historical Association stating that "AskHistorians is, in effect, a training ground for historical thinking facilitated by the moderators and experts". Many of AskHistorians' most popular posts deal with common historical myths and misconceptions, such as the theory that lead caused the fall of the Roman Empire.

== Moderation ==
AskHistorians is strictly moderated, with rules related to civility and academic rigor. Though initially only lightly moderated, the subreddit has added moderators and rules as its subscriber count grew. Questions and answers are limited to events that occurred at least twenty years ago.

AskHistorians has been noted for its commitment to combating Holocaust denial, in comparison with the more lax policies of Facebook. The moderators of AskHistorians are outspoken about their policy of banning all Holocaust deniers and Nazi sympathisers from the platform, and preventing Nazi apologism or manipulation of historical facts surrounding The Holocaust. AskHistorians' contributors also write in-depth explorations of the circumstances in which the Holocaust occurred, and its historical weight.

== AMAs ==
AskHistorians regularly hosts expert Q&A panels called AMAs (short for "Ask Me Anything"). These panels include both regular contributors to AskHistorians and outside guest experts.

Some notable guests on AskHistorians include Kate Williams, James F. Brooks, John Lukacs, Eleanor Dickey, Juan Cole, Erica Armstrong Dunbar, James M. McPherson, Brad Lepper, Gavriel Rosenfeld, Eric H. Cline, Benerson Little, and Jack Weatherford. AskHistorians has also featured organizations such as American Battlefield Trust, Ohio History Connection, and Osprey Publishing. On November 25, 2014 Timothy Potts (then director of the J. Paul Getty Museum) hosted an AMA on the Getty Museum. In 2019, the American Archive of Public Broadcasting hosted an AMA on AskHistorians to discuss the value of cultural resources and historical media.

== Conference ==
In September 2020 AskHistorians organized the first ever virtual conference on Reddit. The topic was "Business as Unusual: Histories of Rupture, Chaos, Revolution and Change." The three-day event included AMAs, networking events and panels, with speakers encompassing academics and museum professionals. According to the organizers, the event reached an audience of approximately 30–40,000 people, over 90% of whom were likely to be attending their first history conference. A further conference, on the theme of '[Deleted] & Missing History: Reconstructing the Past, Confronting Distortions', was held in 2021.

== Podcast ==
AskHistorians launched its own dedicated history podcast on December 20, 2016. The podcast features 30–90 minute interviews with dedicated members of the r/AskHistorians community, as well as academics and published experts in the fields of history, anthropology, and archaeology. Since August 2018, it also features AskHistorians Aloud, shorter episodes which focus on narrating answers to questions from their subreddit.
