= Cassidy Percoco =

American fashion historian

- Occupation: Historian
- Known for: AskHistorians

Academic background
- Education: Fashion Institute of Technology

Academic work
- Discipline: Fashion history
- Institutions: Collections manager, Fenimore Art Museum and Fenimore Farm & Country Village
- Notable works: Regency Women's Dress (2015)
- Website: mimicofmodes.com

Cassidy Percoco is an American fashion historian and collections manager.

== Early life and education ==
Percoco received a BA from Binghamton University in 2009. She received a Master of Arts degree in Fashion and Textile History, Theory, and Museum Practice from the Fashion Institute of Technology in 2012.

== Career ==
Percoco is collections manager at the Fenimore Art Museum and the Fenimore Farm & Country Village. In 2015, she published the book Regency Women's Dress: Techniques and Patterns 1800–1830. The book examines the techniques and styles of women's clothing in the Regency era. It begins with a brief overview of the history of Regency era women's fashion, and includes patterns, line drawings, and photographs for 26 historical garments from museum collections in New York and Massachusetts, many of which were previously unpublished. In a review for The Journal of the Costume Society of America, Ann Buerman Wass praised its informativeness and recommended it to costume designers and period enthusiasts. Pat Poppy, reviewing the book for Costume gave it a similarly positive review, writing that "those looking to recreate garments of this period will find many options here."

=== Public history ===
Percoco is a moderator and contributor to the online history platform AskHistorians, where she writes content and answers Q&As related to fashion history, women's history and social history. She also authors the history blog A Most Beguiling Accomplishment. She has been interviewed as a featured expert in publications like Teen Vogue and Den of Geek, where she has discussed the historical accuracy of costuming in films and series such as Netflix's Bridgerton. She has also written for popular history publications such as History Today.
