= Classical Association of the Middle West and South =

The Classical Association of the Middle West and South (CAMWS) is a professional organization for classicists and non-classicists at all levels of instruction which promotes the Classics through the broad scope of its annual meeting, through its publication of both original research and pedagogical contributions in The Classical Journal and Teaching Classical Languages and through its awards, scholarships, and outreach initiatives.

== Background ==
CAMWS was founded at the University of Chicago in 1905 as the first regional classical organization in the United States of America. It immediately began publication of the Classical Journal, which became only the second classical journal (excluding annuals) in the country. Twenty-two states belonged at CAMWS' inception; there are now thirty-two states and three Canadian provinces. CAMWS is an educational, non-profit organization, the largest of all regional Classical groups; membership is open to anyone with Classical interests, regardless of place of residence. Its members (c. 1,500) are primarily college and university professors, K-12 teachers, and graduate students whose specialty is Classics: Classical languages (Greek and Latin) and the world of ancient Greece and Rome. Departments of Classics at colleges and universities, high schools which teach Latin, publishers and other classical organizations are also welcome to join CAMWS as institutional members.

A committee of CAMWS, the Committee for the Promotion of Latin (CPL), serves as CAMWS' arm for public outreach.

CAMWS offers a variety of awards and scholarships, including the Bolchazy Pedagogy Book Prize, CPL Promotional Activity Award, CAMWS New Teacher Awards, CAMWS Travel Grant For High School Groups, Excavation/Field School Award, Faculty-Undergraduate Collaborative Research Grant, CAMWS First Book Award, Manson A. Stewart Undergraduate Awards, Manson A. Stewart Teacher Training and Travel Awards, Outstanding Accomplishment in High School or Undergraduate Classical Studies, Ovationes, Phinney Book Prize, Presidential Award for Outstanding Graduate Student Paper, School Awards (Latin Translation Contest), Semple, Grant, and Benario Awards, Special Service Award, and Teaching Awards for both high school and college/university teachers.

CAMWS holds its annual meeting in March or April. In odd-numbered years the annual meeting is held in a northern or western state or in Canada. In even-numbered years it is held in a southern state.

CAMWS is a member of the Society for Classical Studies, the National Humanities Alliance and the International Federation of Associations of Classical Studies (FIEC).
