= Benjamin Farrington =

Irish scholar and professor

- A 1940 photograph of Farrington as he appeared on The Challenge of Socialism
- Born: 10 July 1891
- Died: 17 November 1974 (aged 83)
- Political party: Communist Party of Great Britain (1936 - 1956)
- Spouse: Ruth Schechter

Academic background
- Education: University College Cork; Trinity College Dublin

Academic work
- Discipline: Classical Studies
- Sub-discipline: Greek History
- Institutions: Queen's University Belfast; University of Cape Town; University College, Swansea
- Main interests: Materialism; Humanism

Benjamin Farrington (10 July 1891 –17 November 1974) was an Irish scholar and professor of Classics, teaching in Ireland (1916–1920), South Africa (1920–1935), and Great Britain (1935–1956). Although his academic career spanned several disciplines, he is most well known for his contributions to the history of Greek science. Moreover, within the development of the discipline, his books were some of the first written in the English language that focused specifically on Greek science. In addition to his professional academic career he was also active in socialist politics, using his intellectual capabilities to speak and write on it. While beginning his academic career in South Africa in 1920 he became heavily involved in the Irish Republican Association of South Africa. In the process he wrote several articles for local South African newspapers about the need for Ireland to separate from England. In addition, he was instrumental in forming the Irish Peace Conference in Paris in 1922. Such political commitments inevitably influenced his teaching style, giving him the reputation in South Africa of being an intellectual Marxist. However, from the perspective of some critics, his Marxist commitments overshadowed his scholarly work, heavily tainting them. One of his better known pamphlets on socialism, written in 1940, is The Challenge of Socialism.

== Early life ==
Farrington was born in Cork City, Ireland into an Anglo-Irish family. His father was the city engineer and was a Congregationalist, a Protestant church in the Calvinist tradition.

== Political activism ==
Farrington arrived in South Africa in March 1920 to serve as a lecturer at the University of Cape Town. By September, Farrington was writing articles for Die Burger (The Citizen) in which he tried to persuade the paper's Afrikaan readership to support Sinn Féin and the Irish in the Irish War of Independence. Keeping in mind the readership was also overwhelming Protestant, Farrington sought to frame the conflict as a cultural and political one, not one based on a religious divide as some might. Farrington's partisan articles for Die Burger annoyed his employers at the University of Cape Town, who issued him a formal warning, which Farrington abided by. Nonetheless, at the same time Farrington formed the Irish Republican Association of South Africa (IRASA), which launched its own newspaper The Republic in November 1920. Farrington served as the editor of the paper which ran from November 1920 to June 1922 over the course of 41 editions. The front of the first edition of the paper featured a portrait of Terence McSwiney, the Lord Mayor of Cork who had just recently died on a hunger strike.

In November 1921, Farrington was elected by the IRASA to be the organisation's delegate to the Irish Race Conference in Paris to be held in January 1922. Many, including Eamon De Valera, credited the South African Irish and Farrington with the idea of holding another Irish Race Convention, as Farrington had been pushing the idea of an "Irish World Organisation" since early 1921, an association of members of the Irish Diaspora which would have a greater influence in the building of the new Irish Republic. However, what was posed to be a great feather in Farrington's cap ended in disaster as the convention was racked with in-fighting between those for and against the newly signed Anglo-Irish Treaty. Another issue was that during the convention, delegates from Ireland pushed for the idea that the "Irish World Organisation" should be controlled by a committee in Ireland that would dictate policy to the Irish abroad. Farrington himself hated this idea and, in order to prevent it, opposed his own Irish World Organisation idea.

Following the convention, a dejected Farrington returned to South Africa where in The Republic he broke the IRASA's own policy of neutrality on the issue of the Anglo-Irish treaty to attack De Valera and his cult of personality. Farrington also conceded that violence would be inevitable, foreshadowing the breakout of the Irish Civil War. The bitter divisions caused by the Civil war seemed to cause the IRASA to break apart, and the Republic did not publish any more editions after June 1922. Simultaneously, events back in South Africa were also weighing down on Farrington; the Rand Rebellion broke out in March and pushed Farrington away from entertaining Afrikaan nationalism. Farrington was disappointed to see the Rand Rebellion, which had started as a workers' strike, became subsumed by segregationists.

Instead of actively campaigning, Farrington withdrew and became to study the work of Irish Syndicalist James Connolly, of whom he became an admirer. In 1921 South African Communist Party was formed, but despite Farrington's newfound interest in Connolly he declined to join. Instead, he would gravitate towards Trotskyist groups already setting up as well in South Africa.

In c. 1936 Farrington (and his wife Ruth) joined the Communist Party of Great Britain following their immigration to the UK. Following the Hungarian Revolution of 1956 Farrington left the Communist party, dismayed by the Soviet counter-invasion.

== Academic career ==
Benjamin Farrington received a Classics degree from University College Cork, Ireland, and then a degree in Middle English from Trinity College Dublin, Ireland. From 1915 to 1917 he pursued a master's degree in English from University College, completing his thesis in 1917 on Percy Bysshe Shelley's translations from Greek. While finishing his thesis he also served as an assistant professor in Classics at Queen's University in Belfast from 1916–1920. In 1920 he moved to South Africa to teach at the University of Cape Town, serving as Lecturer in Greek (1920–1922), Senior Lecturer in Classics (1922–1930), and Professor of Latin (1930–1935). In 1935 he moved to England to become Lecturer in Classics at the University of Bristol (1935–1936), and then Professor of Classics at University College, Swansea (1936–1956), where he taught until his retirement.

== Critical reception ==
We are tantalized because his case is so nearly good, and might have been very good. If only he would avoid ridiculous overstatements bound to alienate,... Lastly, the book annoys, because ... it abounds in misleading statements or half-truths.

— W. K. C. Guthrie, review of Science and Politics in the Ancient World, The Classical Review, 54(1940): 34–5.

There is enough truth in Professor Farrington's main contention to cause one to wish that his book had been more fairly conceived. Let it be granted that politics and vested religious interests have often opposed the scientific spirit;... Yet it remains true that Greek humanism is as notable an achievement as Greek science.... Science is the chief foe of superstition, but to suppose that science alone will ever achieve man's good is itself a grandiose superstition.

— William C. Greene, review of Science and Politics in the Ancient World, Classical Philology, 36(1941): 201–2.

Professor Farrington, in this book, conclusively shows that the popular superstition which in the Ancient World formed so effective an obstacle to the progress of science was a superstition which was, for the most part, deliberately thought out by the 'patricians' and deliberately foisted by them upon the 'plebeians'.

— M. F. Ashley Montagu, review of Science and Politics in the Ancient World, Isis, 33(1941): 270–3.

Farrington's Greek Science thus seems at once very stimulating and very biased, excellent in many respects but to be read with a critical mind. Until a better book on the subject comes along—and that may not be soon—it will fill a considerable need for a readable work dealing with the science of the ancient Greeks.

— Bentley Glass, review of Greek Science: Its Meaning for Us, Quarterly Review of Biology, 30 (1955): 281.

An explanation for the decline of ancient science has been put forward by the historian of science, Benjamin Farrington: "The mercantile tradition, which led to Ionian science, also led to a slave economy. The owning of slaves was the road to wealth and power. Polycrates’ fortifications were built by slaves. Athens in the time of Pericles, Plato and Aristotle had a vast slave population. All the brave Athenian talk about democracy applied only to a privileged few. What slaves characteristically perform is manual labor. But scientific experimentation is manual labor, from which the slaveholders are preferentially distanced; while it is only the slaveholders – politely called ‘gentle-men’ in some societies – who have the leisure to do science. Accordingly, almost no one did science. The Ionians were perfectly able to make machines of some elegance. But the availability of slaves undermined the economic motive for the development of technology. Thus the mercantile tradition contributed to the great Ionian awakening around 600 B.C., and, through slavery, may have been the cause of its decline some two centuries later. There are great ironies here."

— Carl Sagan, Cosmos Chapter 7, Random House, New York (1980)

== Personal life ==
Not long after settling in Cape Town in South Africa, Farrington began to attend the salon of Ruth Schechter, a member of the intelligentsia in her own right but also notable as the daughter of Solomon Schechter, the American Rabbi, and the wife of politician and lawyer Morris Alexander. Over the years Farrington and Schechter became quite close. Schechter left her husband and South Africa in 1933 and married Farrington in August 1935 in the United Kingdom. Ruth died in March 1942.

== Bibliography ==
- Science in Antiquity (1936, reprinted in 1969).
- The Civilisation of Greece and Rome (1938, Victor Gollancz).
- Science and Politics in the Ancient World (1939, 1946).
- Greek Science: Its Meaning for Us; Part I (1944, reprinted with Part II in 1953, paperback 2000 ISBN 0-85124-631-1).
- Head and Hand in Ancient Greece: Four Studies in the Social Relations of Thought (1947, paperback 2001 ISBN 0-85124-654-0).
- Greek Science: Its Meaning for Us; Part II (1949, reprinted with Part I in 1953, paperback 1981 ISBN 0-85124-288-X, 2000 ISBN 0-85124-631-1).
- Francis Bacon, Philosopher of Industrial Science (1951, 1973 ISBN 0-8383-1685-9, reprint 1979 ISBN 0-374-92706-5).
- Francis Bacon, Pioneer of Planned Science (1963, 1969 ISBN 0-298-16449-3)
- The Philosophy of Francis Bacon (1964 ISBN 0-85323-310-1, paperback 1966 ISBN 0-226-23885-7).
- Lucretius, editor (1965).
- What Darwin Really Said (1966 ISBN 0-8052-3282-6, paperback 1996 ISBN 0-8052-1062-8).
- The Faith of Epicurus (1967).
- The Philosophy of Francis Bacon: An essay on its development from 1603 to 1609, with new translations of fundamental texts (1970).
- Samuel Butler and the Odyssey (1974 ISBN 0-8383-1777-4).
