= Henry Roy William Smith =

English classicist (1891–1971)

- Born: 1891
- Died: March 2, 1971 (aged 79–80)
- Occupations: Classicist and historian
- Children: 1

Academic background
- Education: PhD, Princeton University

Henry Roy William Smith (1891–2 March 1971) was an English classicist and historian. He was professor of Latin and classical archaeology at the University of California, Berkeley.

== Early life and education ==
Smith was born in 1891 and attended St Paul's School, London. He studied at University of Oxford where he received a Bachelor of Arts degree in 1914, followed by a Master of Arts degree in 1917. He received his PhD from Princeton University in 1927.

== Career ==
In 1914, Smith took up the post of associate professor of classics at St. Francis Xavier College in Antigonish, Nova Scotia, Canada. He left shortly after because of World War I and joined the British Army, serving on the Macedonian front where he was injured at Salonika. After the war, he returned to St. Francis Xavier College, where he was associate professor until 1920, and then full professor from 1920 until 1923. After St. Francis Xavier, he joined the faculty of Princeton University, where he served as instructor and then assistant professor of classics.

Smith went to University of California, Berkeley in 1928, where he was appointed assistant professor of Latin. He became associate professor in 1930, and in 1931 became full professor of Latin and classical archaeology.

In 1935, Smith received a Guggenheim Fellowship to research Greek vase painting, especially the so-called "Lewis Painter". He retired from teaching in 1958 with the title of emeritus associate curator of classical archaeology.

== Retirement and death ==
After retiring, he travelled to Rio de Janeiro, Brazil. There, he studied South Italian artefacts that had been brought to Rio from Naples as part of the dowry of Teresa Cristina, the last Brazilian empress.

He died in Berkeley, California on 2 March 1971. At the time of his death, he and his wife had one son.

The Henry Roy William Smith Papers are part of the collection of the Bancroft Library.
