= Targeteer =

A targeteer is a military or intelligence officer responsible for planning and coordinating bombardment-type attacks. Duties include identifying critical elements or vulnerable points, estimating collateral damage, selecting munitions required, and submitting targets to commanders. After an attack, the targeteer is responsible for battle damage assessment to establish whether the strike had the desired effect.
