= Roel Konijnendijk =

Dutch historian

Academic background
- Education: BA and MPhil, Leiden University; PhD, University College London
- Thesis: Ideals and Pragmatism in Greek Military Thought, 490–338 BC (2015)
- Doctoral advisor: Hans van Wees

Academic work
- Discipline: Classics, Ancient History
- Notable works: Classical Greek Tactics

Roel Konijnendijk is a Dutch historian working in the United Kingdom. He is known for his research on Classical Greek warfare and military thought, and has authored the book Classical Greek Tactics.

== Early life and education ==
Roel Konijnendijk enrolled at Leiden University in 2004 where he received a BA and MPhil in history. He has also studied in Taiwan and worked at the Rijksmuseum van Oudheden in Leiden. In 2015, Konijnendijk graduated from University College London with a PhD, where he was supervised by Hans van Wees.

== Career ==
=== Academic history ===
Konijnendijk was a postdoctoral fellow at the Institute of Historical Research and Leiden. He has taught Greek History at Birkbeck, University of Warwick, University of Edinburgh, New College, Oxford, and Lincoln College, Oxford. He has contributed to a number of books on the topics of Classical Greek warfare, the military reforms of Iphicrates, Athenian democracy, and the military history of Sparta. He is also cited as an expert on the training and organization of Classical Greek and Persian armies.

He is a proponent of the theory that Greek warfare was both more brutal than some modern scholars have described, and that it was driven by practicality rather than ritual. His research challenges the so-called "California School" of Greek military scholarship, arguing that its theories were largely based on outdated 19th-century models.

In 2017, Konijnendijk published Classical Greek Tactics: A Cultural History. The book was well received, with praise for Konijnendijk's re-assessment of Greek tactics. With Cezary Kucewicz and Matthew Lloyd he edited Companion to Greek Land Warfare Beyond the Phalanx (2021), and also wrote three chapters of it.

He published his second monograph, Between Miltiades and Moltke: Early German Studies in Greek Military History, in 2022.

In September 2022, Konijnendijk was appointed Darby Fellow and Tutor in Ancient History at Lincoln College, Oxford.

=== Popular history ===
Konijnendijk is a moderator and panelist for r/AskHistorians, a history forum on Reddit. He has also written for a number of popular history magazines, including Ancient Warfare, Ancient History Magazine, Ancient World Magazine, BadAncient, and Desperta Ferro.

==== Insider ====
Since 2021, he has appeared in a series of videos for Insider, where he discusses the historical accuracy of well-known fantasy and historical drama films such as 300, Game of Thrones, Gladiator II, and The Lord of the Rings: The Two Towers.

== Selected bibliography ==
- Between Miltiades and Moltke: Early German Studies in Greek Military History. Brill Publishers. 2022.
- "The Face of Battle at Plataiai", in The Battle of Plataia 479 BC. Phoibos. 2022.
- "The eager amateur: unit cohesion and the Athenian hoplite phalanx", in Unit Cohesion in the Ancient World. Routledge. 2022.
- (ed. and contributor with C. Kucewicz and M. Lloyd). A Companion to Greek Land Warfare Beyond the Phalanx. Brill Publishers. 2021.
- "Legitimization of war" in A Companion to the Achaemenid Persian Empire. Wiley-Blackwell. 2021.
- "Democracy as protection against intra-communal violence in Classical Greece", in Violence and Democracy. British Academy, 2019.
- "Commemoration through fear: the Spartan reputation as a weapon of war", in Commemorating War and War Dead: Ancient and Modern. Steiner Verlag, 2019.
- Classical Greek Tactics: A Cultural History. Brill Publishers. 2018.
- "Iphikrates the innovator and the historiography of Lechaion", in Iphicrates, Peltasts and Lechaeum. Akanthina, 2014.
