= Hans van Wees =

Classicist and historian

Academic background
- Thesis: Status Warriors: War, Violence and Society in Homer and History

Academic work
- Discipline: Classicist and historian
- Institutions: Grote Professor of Ancient History at University College London

Hans van Wees is a classicist and Grote Professor of Ancient History at University College London.

== Academic career ==
His doctoral thesis was developed into a book and published in 1992 as Status Warriors: War, Violence and Society in Homer and History. In 2000, he was editor of War and Violence in Ancient Greece.

He was Lecturer, Reader and Professor at University College London from 1995 until 2011, when he became Grote Professor of Ancient History. He was PhD supervisor for Errietta Bissa, Roel Konijnendijk, Cezary Kucewicz, and Beatrice Pestarino.

He published Greek Warfare: Myths and Realities in 2005. The book provides a general overview of the practice of warfare in ancient Greece, challenging long-standing assumptions about the purpose and nature of war presented by scholars like Victor Davis Hanson.

In 2013, he published Ships, Silver, Taxes and Tribute: A Fiscal History of Archaic Athens. The book was praised for its insight on public finance in the archaic poleis.

He has co-edited multiple volumes, including Competition in the Ancient World and Cambridge History of Greek and Roman Warfare.
