= Chester G. Starr =

American historian

- Born: October 5, 1914; Centralia, Missouri, US
- Died: September 22, 1999 (aged 84); Ann Arbor, Michigan, US

Academic background
- Education: Cornell University

Academic work
- Discipline: history
- Sub-discipline: ancient history
- Institutions: University of Illinois; University of Michigan; U.S. Army
- Main interests: ancient art and archeology of the Greco-Roman civilization
- Notable works: A History of the Ancient World

Chester G. Starr (October 5, 1914, in Centralia, Missouri – September 22, 1999, in Ann Arbor, Michigan) was an American historian. An authority on ancient history, he specialized in the ancient art and archeology of the Greco-Roman civilization. According to the University of Michigan, he was "the acknowledged dean of ancient history in America."

Starr studied at Cornell University, with Max Ludwig Wolfram Laistner. Between 1940 and 1953 he was lecturer in history at the University of Illinois, Urbana. He became a professor in the same department, a position he held until 1970, when he moved to the University of Michigan. From 1973 to 1985 he held the Bentley Chair at Michigan. In 1974 he became the first president of the American Association of Ancient Historians.

During World War II Starr served in the history section of the U.S. Army, posted to the headquarters of the United States Fifth Army in Italy from 1942 to 1946. As a result of that commission, he wrote a nine-volume compilation entitled Fifth Army History, and a popular book about it titled From Salerno to the Alps (1948).

Among his historical works are twenty-one books, dozens of articles and over one hundred book reviews. His best-known text, A History of the Ancient World, was reissued with successive enlargements between 1965 and 1991. His historiographical methodology has been described as Hegelian, especially in Civilization and the Caesars: The Intellectual Revolution in the Roman Empire (1954). In what has been called his greatest work: The Origins of Greek Civilization (1961), he dismantled the Nordic theory, which sought to interpret Greek cultural achievements in terms of a master race. His approach focused on individuals as agents of historical change, in contrast to the dominant methodology of the time: the Annales School and the Braudelian concept of longue durée.

Among his other works are The Awakening of the Greek Historical Spirit (1968), Economic Growth of Early Greece (1977), The Beginnings of Imperial Rome: Rome in the Mid-Republic (1980), The Flawed Mirror (1983) and Past and Future in Ancient History (1987).
