= Cyropaedia =

Work by Xenophon on Cyrus the Great

Cryopaedia
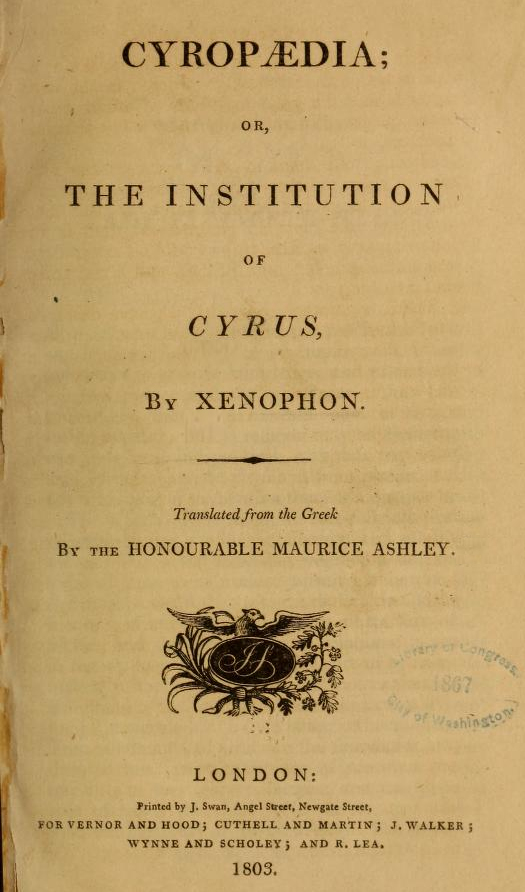
- Xenophon's Cyropaedia, 1803 English edition. Translated by Maurice Ashley.
- Author: Xenophon
- Original title: Κύρου παιδεία
- Language: Ancient Greek
- Subject: Cyrus the Great Achaemenid Empire
- Publication date: c. 370 BC
- Pages: 8 books

The Cyropaedia (also spelled Cyropedia; Ancient Greek: Κύρου παιδεία, Kýrou Paideía, lit. 'The Education of Cyrus') is a work by the Greek soldier, historian, and philosopher Xenophon. Written around 370 BC, it presents an account of Cyrus the Great, founder of the Achaemenid Persian Empire.

The Cyropaedia is Xenophon's longest work and among his most difficult to classify, as it does not fit neatly into any established Greek literary genre. It has been variously interpreted as an early novel, a biography, and a manifesto on leadership. Its authorial intent is also difficult to interpret. However, most scholars agree that the Cyropaedia is not strictly historical but is also intended to communicate political and moral instruction.

The Cyropaedia is traditionally divided into eight books recounting Cyrus's upbringing, military campaigns, and the organization of his empire. Xenophon does not provide an exhaustive account of Cyrus's life and campaigns. Instead, he concentrates on events occurring in Persia, Media, and Babylon. Book I describes the Persian education system and Cyrus's stay at the Median court with his grandfather, King Astyages. Books II through VII describe Cyrus's military campaigns, while Book VIII shifts focus to Cyrus's administration and the organization of the empire. All known manuscripts and modern editions of the Cyropaedia contain an epilogue lamenting the moral decline in Persia during Xenophon's own time. Opinions on the epilogue's authenticity vary, with some scholars doubting Xenophon's authorship.

== Genre and historicity ==
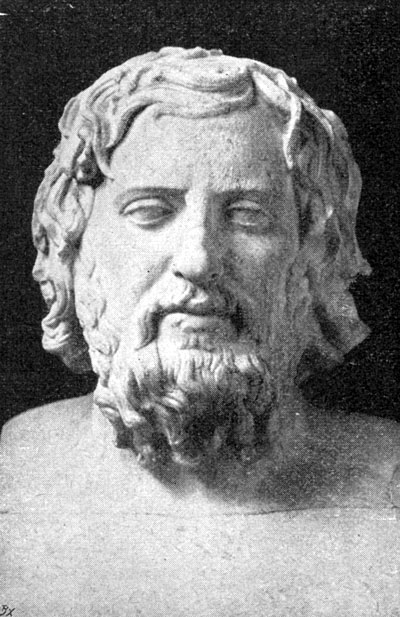
Bust of Xenophon author of the Cyropaedia.

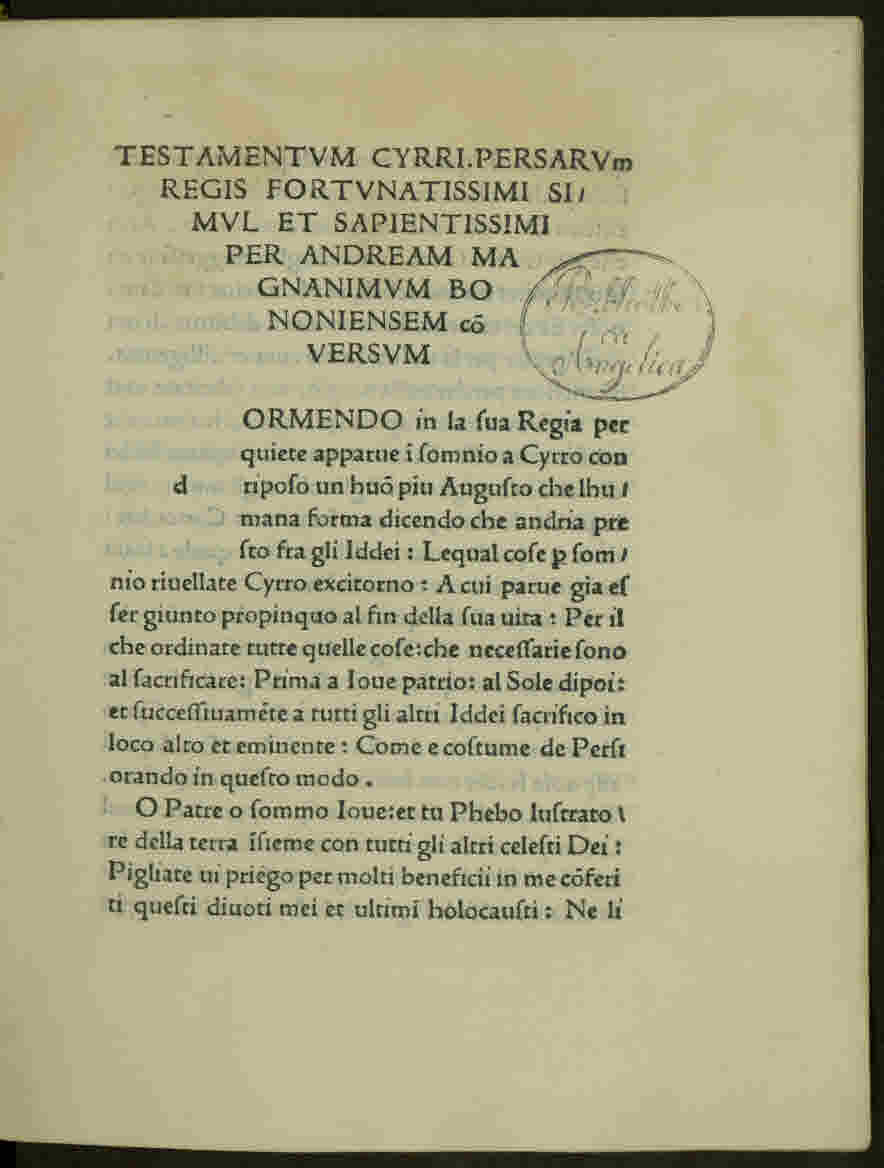
1594 edition

The Cyropaedia as a valid as a source of Achaemenid history has been repeatedly debated, with numerous of Xenophon's descriptions of events or persons having been found to be inaccurate.

Xenophon, who was born roughly a century after Cyrus's death around 530 BC, was likely influenced by his experience in Persia during the fourth century BC. Xenophon accompanied the Ten Thousand, a force of Greek mercenaries employed by Cyrus the Younger in an attempt to overthrow his brother Artaxerxes II, which he recounted in his Anabasis. This experience gave Xenophon knowledge about Persian oral traditions but might have also introduced anachronisms into the Cyropaedia.

== Synopsis ==
=== Book I ===
(1) The work begins with a discourse on the unprecedentedly large and diverse empire built by Cyrus the Great. After an overview of Persian society, Xenophon begins the biographical section when Cyrus is twelve years old. Cyrus's mother Mandane receives a message from her father Astyages, King of the Medes, requesting that she and her son visit him in Media. Introduced to his grandfather, Cyrus notes how the luxurious clothing and behavior of the Medes differ from the simpler customs of Persia. Mandane and Cyrus stay in the kingdom for a bit, and the boy learns the traditions of the Medes and forms a good relationship with Astyages. When Mandane is ready to go back to Persia, which is a vassal under the Medes, to see her husband, her father wants Cyrus to stay. Mandane is against the idea, but lets Cyrus make his own choice. Cyrus decides to stay, stating that he has more to learn from the Medes.

Growing up in Media Cyrus gains a following of companions that he trains with. He also goes hunting with them, but they are limited on what they can hunt to keep them safe due to their ages. This does not sit well with Cyrus who begs his uncle, Cyaxares, to take him hunting. His uncle refuses at first but agrees later on. While hunting with Cyaxare, Cyrus comes upon dangerous animals that he risks his life to give his game to Astyages out of the love he has for him. Astyages rejects the gifts telling Cyrus that no gift could be worth endangering his life over.

During this time the King of Assyria is getting married. To celebrate he assembles a huge group of people to go hunting between the borders of the Assyrian and Median empires. Arriving at the hunting spot, the Assyrian King realized he had a massive host to raid the Medes' borders. Astyages summoned his armies in response to the Assyrians pillaging his lands. Even though Cyrus was too young to fight he could not contain himself and joined his grandfather on the march. The Median force comes across a host of Assyrians carrying away stolen goods. Astyages is hesitant to send in his troops for fear of enemy cavalry countercharging them. Cyrus suggests that Cyaxares should lead a small cavalry division to intercept the foot soldiers carrying the loot. If the enemy cavalry tries to reinforce the infantry, Astyages's troops rush in to stop them. The plan works with the Medes pushing back the Assyrians. Astyages gives the victory to Cyrus but mentions how his strategy was one of madness.

Cyrus's reputation from the battle spreads throughout the empire. His father, Cambyses I, hears of his son's achievements and calls him back home to Persia. On his return, Cyrus is welcomed back with open arms. His friends thought he would have come back as a luxurious Mede but instead he returns as a simple Persian. He spends his time in Persia until he becomes a young man, learning and training in military traditions.

Astyages passes away and Cyaxares becomes ruler over the Median empire. The Assyrian King at the same time is going around conquering his neighbors. He looks to the Medes and Persians, convincing his allies that the two empires are a threat. Together with their allies, the Assyrians commanded over 60,000 horsemen and 200,000 archers and targeteers. Cyaxares knew of their plans and sent word to Persia asking for Cyrus to bring reinforcements. Cyrus assembles 10,000 archers, 10,000 slingers, and 10,000 targeteers. Before marching off to war he gives his army a speech promising them victory against their enemies.

=== Book II ===
(2)Cyrus and Cambyses meet up with Cyaxares's forces. After discussing scouting reports, army sizes, and strategy they are heavily at a disadvantage. The biggest one is their army size of 100,000 troops, 10,000 horsemen and 60,000 archers and targeteers coming from the Medes, against the enemies' army size of 260,000. Being so outnumbered Cyrus mentions that they cannot win by a war of attrition. He realizes that if he cannot win with numbers then he can win with a better-quality army. He states that the common tactic of warfare is lightly armored range units, so he decides to refit his army to be more of a heavy melee army. His troops receive a corslet for the breast, a shield for the left arm, and a sword or battle-axe for the right hand.

The Persian army is trained by Cyrus in melee combat. He issues military reforms like ordering the soldiers of units to live together to form a bond with each other. Not giving soldiers food until they completed all their workouts. How hard the soldier works determines their rewards. Meetings are held with his officers to learn about the army's progress. Cyrus is informed of the difficulty the army is having with learning new tactics but they are improving. The rest of Book II focuses on Cyrus and his captains' thoughts on the new recruits. Some of the captains believe that time is needed for the recruits to settle into their positions. The other captains agree but do not think there is enough time for the recruits to be ready for battle.

=== Book III ===
(3)The Persian army heads toward the Armenian Kingdom to collect the tribute owed to the Medes. The King of Armenia gathers his army to confront the Persians but flees when he learns of Cyrus leading the army. The King takes refuge high up in the mountains. Cyrus responds by surrounding the exit points with his army and captures the King's family and his treasure. He sends messengers to the located villages telling them that he considers them an enemy if they stay in their homes. Messengers are also sent to the King telling him to come to meet with Cyrus. Eventually, the King meets with Cyrus who puts the King on trial for abandoning his agreement with the Medes. The King's reasoning for not honoring the agreement was to gain freedom for his people. He still accepts any punishment given until his son, Tigranes, pleads with Cyrus to spare his father. Tigranes tries to convince Cyrus that his father is valuable as an ally and that his father learns from his folly. An argument ensues between the two over the question of whether or not a person can learn from his follies in such a short time. In the end, Cyrus grants the Tigranes his wish, and is happy that he gained another ally.

Cyrus returns everything that he seized back to the King, then asks him to quantify his material wealth and military power. The King tells Cyrus he has 8,000 horsemen, 40,000 archers and targeteers, and over 3,000 silver talents. Cyrus strikes a deal to take half of the Armenian army to add to his own. He also makes the King pay 100 talents of silver to both Cyrus and the Medes. The Persian army heads off with their detachment of Armenian forces led by Tigranes to deal with the Chaldaeans who are at war with the Armenians. While at the border of the two nations, Cyrus looks for a spot to build a fort to gain control over the area. He comes across a mountain range known to be a scouting position used by the Chaldaeans. Rather than conquering the enemy, Cyrus wants to end the conflict between the Armenians and the Chaldaeans. However, Cyrus does not want to wait for peace talks, and charges up the hill to capture the high ground. Chaldaean scouts see his army moving and try to counter their assault.

Cyrus leads his men up the hill, but Tigranes informs him that his Armenian soldiers cannot hold the hill against the enemy. The Chaldaeans are reputed to have the fiercest warriors in the region. In response, Cyrus orders the Armenians to feint a retreat, with the expectation that the Chaldaean soldiers will pursue them only to be surrounded by Cyrus's more experienced melee troops. Cyrus's plan works, causing the enemy to retreat and take control of the high ground. Messengers are sent to the Armenian King, asking him to bring builders to help build the fort. Medical assistance is given to the Chaldaean prisoners. Cyrus then makes them an offer: He will set the prisoners free to go back to their people and ask them to decide whether they want to make peace or continue the war. After the prisoners leave, the Armenian King shows up with his workers giving praises for Cyrus's victory. The Chaldaeans return to accept the peace offering. During the discussion, Cyrus offers new terms to both sides: They will be able to use each other's lands to build up resources that they have little of. The Chaldaeans are allowed to use the Armenian flatlands for cultivating crops, and the Armenians are allowed to use the Chaldaean hilly lands for pastures. Both nations also agree to allow marriage between the citizens and help each other in times of war.

Cyrus takes his forces to meet up with Cyaxares at Media. Upon arriving, Cyrus gives over the loot taken in battle to his Uncle. He presses Cyaxares to move against the enemy, first mentioning that they should not meet the enemy in their lands. Cyaxares agrees, and gathers his forces to join Cyrus on the march. Persians, Medes, and Armenians invade the Assyrian lands. Enemy scouts see the advancing army, and report back to the king. The Assyrian king summons his forces and goes out to meet Cyrus in battle. When the two armies are close to each other, neither wants to be the one to advance. The Assyrian forces set up a defensive entrenchment around their camp. Cyaxares wants to attack, but Cyrus informs him that once the enemy sees the smaller force, the Assyrians would not hold back against them. Cyrus is still given the order from his uncle to attack; he obeys the command. Chrysantas and other officers bring information that they captured Assyrian deserters to Cyrus. He learns that a small detachment of the enemy army is on the march with the rest station at the camp. Cyrus presses on the attack, saying to his men: "Brave men to the front! Who follows me? Who will lay the first Assyrian low?" Cyrus's soldiers clash with the Assyrians, and quickly force them to retreat. The fighting continues to take place at the enemy camp, but Cyrus orders his soldiers to pull back, concerned that enemy reinforcements might overrun them.

== Meaning of the Text ==
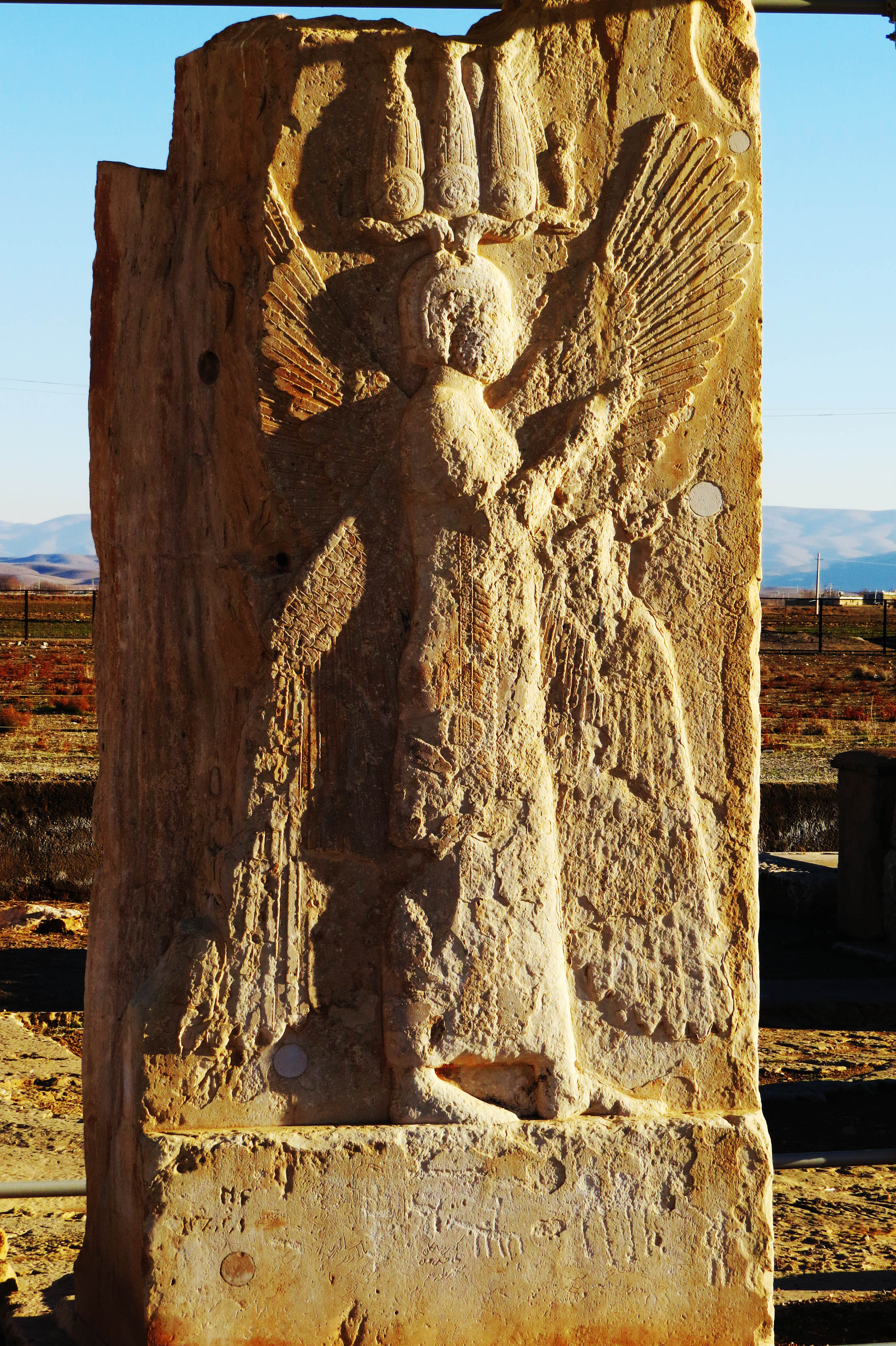
A relief of Cyrus the Great, subject of the Cyropaedia, at Pasargadae.

=== Book I ===
The first book's opening states that it began as a reflection about why some rulers are willingly obeyed and others are not. Everywhere, the author observes, humans fail to obey their rulers; the one exception is Cyrus the Great, a man who inspired obedience.

A list of Cyrus's conquests follows, and the author seeks to understand why his subjects obeyed him "willingly." The work narrates his entire life, with only the first of eight books concerning the actual education of Cyrus.

The first book is devoted to Cyrus's descent, education, and stay at the court of his maternal grandfather, the Median dynast Astyages. Scholars have noted that Xenophon's description of pre-imperial Persian education is unusual and appears to be based upon the traditions of Sparta: the subject of Xenophon's other work the Constitution of the Lacedaemonians.

=== Books II - VII ===
Books two to seven cover Cyrus's life as a Median vassal on his path to establishing the world's largest empire. In these books, Cyrus is upheld as an example of classical virtue, but also uses what are now known as Machiavellian tactics. He proves a faithful vassal to the Medes, initially acting as a general to defend them from the more powerful and assertive Babylonian empire. He does so by cultivating alliances with nations such as the Chaldeans, Hyrcanians, Cadusians, Saka, and Susians. The remaining allies of Babylon include many nations of Asia Minor, as well as a corps of Egyptian infantry. Croesus of Lydia acts as general in the two powers' final field battle. Cyrus then returns with an increasingly international army to conquer Babylon. He is able to avoid a long siege by deflecting the course of the river through it, then sending soldiers in over the dry bed during a festival night. The claim that Babylon was conquered on the night of a festival by diverting the Euphrates River from its channel is also made by Herodotus (1.191).

=== Book VIII ===
Book eight is a sketch of Cyrus' kingship and his views of monarchy.

The last section of this book (8.8) also describes the rapid collapse of Cyrus's empire after he died. It has been speculated that this section was written by a later author. Alternatively, it may symbolize Xenophon's theoretical inconsistency concerning his conception of an ideal ruler, or show that Xenophon did not mean to describe an ideal ruler in any simple way. It may also intend to display, rather than undermine, Cyrus's strength as a leader.

Related characters of questionable historical truth appear in the narrative as well. For example, the romance of Abradatas and Pantheia forms much of the narrative's latter half (v.1.3, vi.1.31ff, vi.4.2ff, vii.3.2ff).

== Reception ==
The Cyropaedia was often used to model correct prose in classical Attic Greek.

=== Classical Antiquity ===
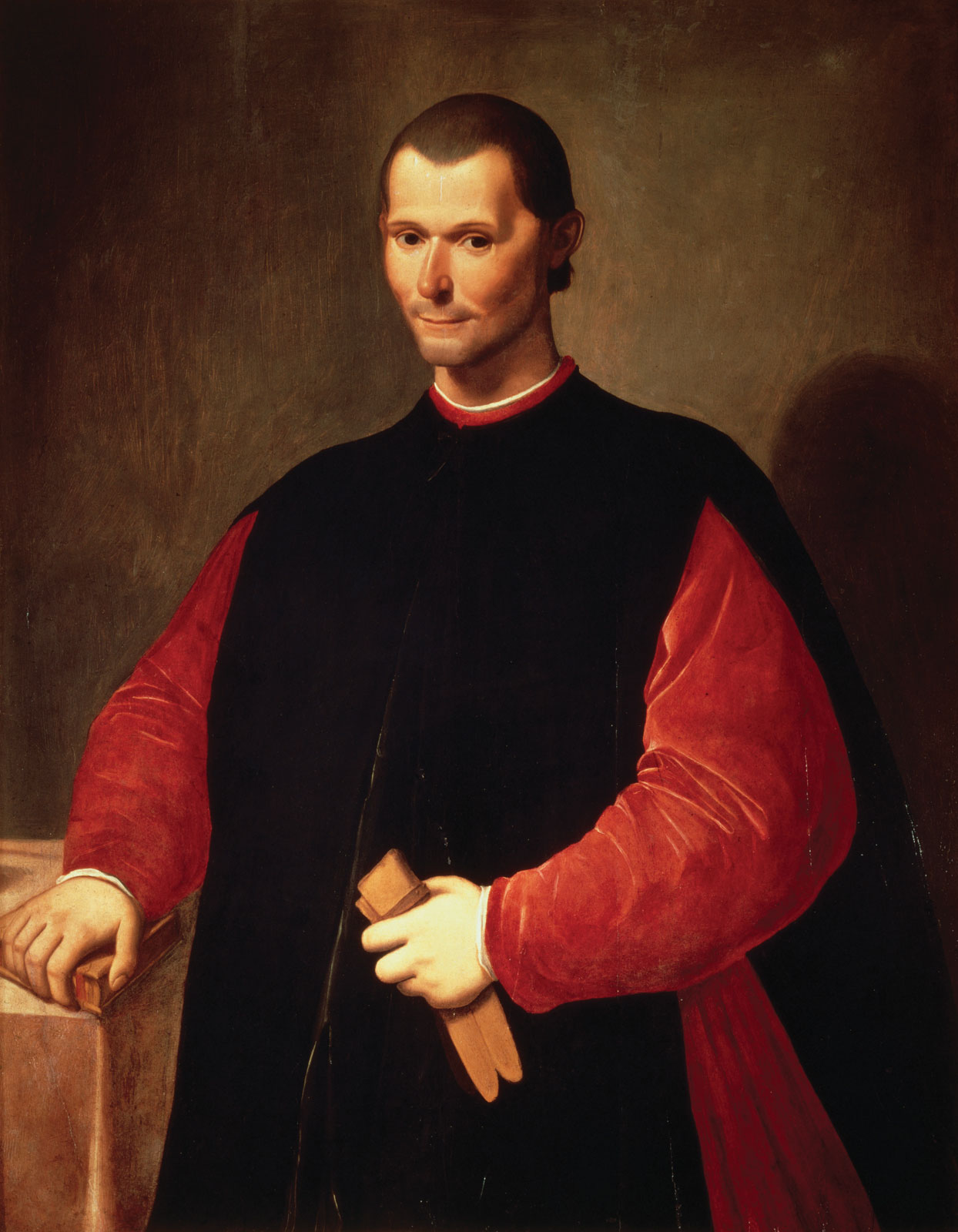
Niccolò Machiavelli was greatly influenced by Xenophon and his Cyropaedia.

A page from Thomas Jefferson's copy of the Cyropaedia where he has crossed out a typographical error.

Xenophon was one most widely read authors of classical antiquity, and the Cyropaedia was considered his magnum opus. Polybius, Cicero, Tacitus, Dionysius of Halicarnassus, Quintilian, Aulus Gellius and Longinus all thought highly of Xenophon and his work. Classical authors believed that he composed the Cyropaedia in response to the Republic of Plato or vice versa, and Plato's Laws seems to allude to the Cyropaedia. Among classical leaders, Scipio Aemilianus is said to have carried a copy with him at all times; it was also a favorite of Alexander the Great and Julius Caesar.

=== Renaissance ===
The Cyropaedia was rediscovered in Western Europe during the late medieval period as a piece on political virtue and social organization. It heavily influenced the late medieval and Renaissance genre known as mirrors of princes, which gave examples of leadership behavior to educate future rulers. Giovanni Pontano, Bartolomeo Sacchi, Leon Battista Alberti and Baldassare Castiglione treated Cyrus as such an example. However, unlike most mirrors of princes, whether the Cyropaedia was really intended to describe an ideal ruler is a subject of debate. Machiavelli was influenced by the Cyropaedia. In Chapter 14 of his political treatise The Prince, he notes that when reading Xenophon's writings on Cyrus, it becomes apparent how Scipio Africanus imitated Cyrus, and how this was to his benefit. This makes Xenophon, alongside Virgil, one of only two classical authors referenced explicitly by name in The Prince.

=== Early Modern Period ===
The Cyropaedia continued to be widely read in the early modern period and during the Enlightenment. Thomas Jefferson held the Cyropaedia in high regard and had two copies of the book in his library. In an 1820 letter to his grandson Francis Eppes, Jefferson recommended that he read the Cyropaedia before Herodotus, Thucydides, and Xenophon's other works the Hellenics and the Anabasis. In 1806, the Cyropaedia became the first book printed in the United States using domestically manufactured Greek type.

=== Modern Reception ===
Beginning in nineteenth century, Xenophon and the Cyropaedia become less popular among academics and the educated public when compared to other classical authors. This is partly owed to growing rigor in evaluating historical sources and because its endorsement of monarchy had grown less favorable. Yet, in the late twentieth and early twenty-first centuries, Xenophon's work has become more studied and esteemed. Some present scholars argue that the basic historical events of the Cyropaedia are more credible than those described in Herodotus's Histories, and debate continues over the work's relevance and historical accuracy.

== Selected Editions ==
The Cyropaedia has been translated into English many times, with the first complete translation being by William Barker in 1567, mainly based on the original Greek but also partially on the earlier translations into Latin (1467) by Francesco Filelfo and Italian by Jacopo Bracciolini (d. 1478).

- 1567: The VIII. Bookes of Xenophon, Containinge the Institution, Schole, and Education of Cyrus. Translated by William Barker. London. Reginald Wolfe.
- 1914: The Education of Cyrus. Translated by Henry Graham Dakyns, revised by F. M. Stawell. London: J. M Dent & Sons. Everyman's Library, no. 672
- 1914: Cyropaedia, translated by Walter Miller. 2 vols. Loeb Classical Library, nos. 51-52. Cambridge, Massachusetts: Harvard University Press.
- 2001: The Education of Cyrus. Translated by Wayne Ambler. Ithaca: Cornell University Press.

== Sources ==
- "Cyrus' Paradise: The World's First Online Collaborative Commentary to an Ancient Text". Cyrus' Paradise. Center for Hellenic Studies. 2026.
- Xenophon (1997), Cyropaedia, translated by Miller, Walter, Cambridge: Harvard University Press, ISBN 978-0-674-99057-9, (books 1-5) and (books 5-8)
- Xenophon (2001), The Education of Cyrus, translated by Ambler, Wayne, Ithaca: Cornell University Press, ISBN 0-8014-8750-1
- Xenophon (1914), Stawell, F. M. (ed.), Cyropaedia: The Education of Cyrus, translated by Dakyns, Henry Graham, London: Macmillan [Project Gutenberg]
- Xenophon (1914), Miller, Walter (ed.), Cyropaedia: The Education of Cyrus, London and Cambridge, MA: William Heinemann Ltd. and Harvard University Press [Perseus/Tufts University]
- Sage, Paula Winsor. "Dying in Style: Xenophon's Ideal Leader and the End of the Cyropaedia" The Classical Journal 90.2 (1994): 161-74
- Xenophon. “Cyropaedia.” Cyropaedia, by Xenophon, July 18, 2009. https://www.gutenberg.org/files/2085/2085-h/2085-h.htm.
