= Classical World (journal) =

Academic journal

- Discipline: Classics
- Language: English
- Edited by: Robin Mitchell-Boyask and Lee T. Pearcy

Publication details
- History: 1907-present
- Publisher: Johns Hopkins University Press on behalf of the Classical Association of the Atlantic States (United States)
- Frequency: Quarterly

Standard abbreviations
- ISO 4: Class. World

Indexing
- ISSN: 0009-8418 (print); 1558-9234 (web)
- LCCN: 10002751
- OCLC no.: 243426026

Links
- Journal homepage; Online access at Project MUSE

Classical World is a quarterly peer-reviewed academic journal published by Johns Hopkins University Press on behalf of the Classical Association of the Atlantic States. The journal focuses on scholarly works pertaining to Greek and Roman literature, history, traditions, as well as the history of classical scholarship. The editors-in-chief are Robin Mitchell-Boyask (Temple University) and Lee T. Pearcy (Bryn Mawr College)

In 1978, The Classical World published five books compiling past bibliographical articles which had appeared in past volumes. These books were on: Greek drama and poetry; Greek and Roman history; philosophy, religion, and rhetoric; Vergil; and Roman drama and poetry and ancient fiction. The Classical World had published many such review articles.

== Abstracts and indices ==
The following abstracts and indices have been created by agents other than the authors and publishers of this journal:

- Arts and Humanities Citation Index
- Current Contents/Arts and Humanities
- EBSCO databases
- International Bibliography of Periodical Literature
- International Bibliography of Book Reviews of Scholarly Literature and Social Sciences
- MLA International Bibliography
- Scopus
