= Abradatas =

6th century BC king of Susa

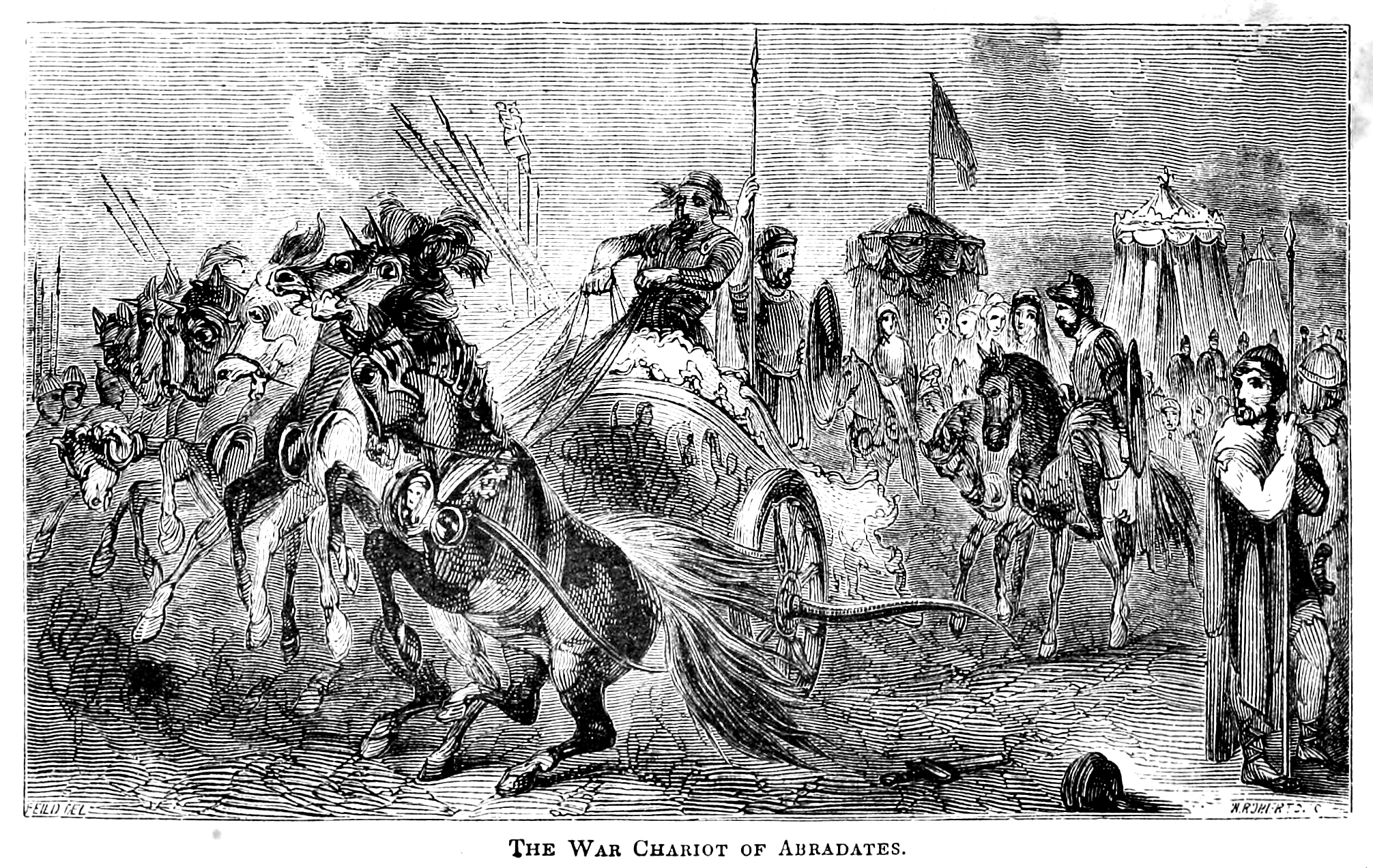
The war chariot of Abradates

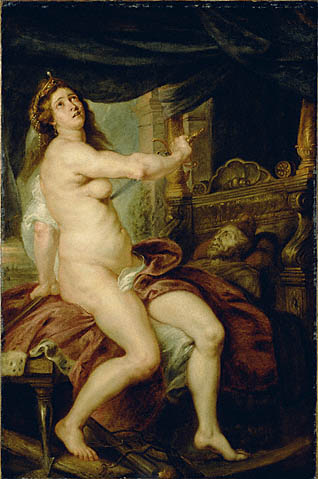
Death of Pantheia, wife of Abradatas, by Peter Paul Rubens

Abradatas (Greek: Αβραδάτας; fl. 6th century BC) was a king, probably fictional, of Susa, known to us from Xenophon's partly fictional biography of Cyrus the Great, the Cyropaedia. According to it, he was an ally of the Assyrians against Cyrus the Great, while Cyrus was still a vassal to his (also probably fictional) uncle, Cyaxares II.

His wife Panthea was taken by Cyrus on the conquest of the Assyrian camp, while Abradatas was absent on a mission to the Bactrians. In consequence of the honorable treatment which his wife received from Cyrus, he was persuaded to join the latter with his forces. He fell in battle, while fighting against the army of Croesus, during the conquest of Lydia in 547 BC. Inconsolable at his loss, Panthea committed suicide, and her example was followed by her three eunuchs. Cyrus had a high mound raised in their honour: on a pillar on the top were inscribed the names of Abradatas and Pantheia in the Syriac characters; and three columns below bore the inscription skēptouchōn (σκηπτούχων) in honour of the eunuchs.

The romance of Abradatas and Pantheia forms a significant part of the latter half of the Cyropaedia.
