= The Classical Journal =

- Discipline: Classics
- Language: English

Publication details
- History: 1905–present
- Publisher: Classical Association of the Middle West and South (United States)
- Frequency: Quarterly

Standard abbreviations
- ISO 4: Class. J.

Indexing
- ISSN: 0009-8353
- JSTOR: 00098353

Links
- Journal homepage

The Classical Journal (CJ) is a quarterly peer-reviewed academic journal of classical studies published by the Classical Association of the Middle West and South.

== Print edition ==
The journal currently has about 2300 subscribers, including approximately 700 libraries and research institutions.

== History ==
As described by JSTOR:

The Classical Journal publishes scholarly articles on Greek and Latin language and literature and on all other aspects of classical studies, together with book reviews. Its Forum section features articles devoted to pedagogy. The journal has been published continuously since 1905; over the years the number of issues per volume has varied, but it is now fixed at four.

The editor-in-chief is elected by the membership of the organization for a five-year term (renewable once). As of 2016, the current editor-in-chief is Georgia Irby (William & Mary). Previous editors have been:

- Arthur Fairbanks (University of Chicago) 1905-1907
- Gordon J. Laing (University of Chicago) 1905-1908
- A. G. Laird (University of Wisconsin) 1907-1909
- Frank J. Miller (University of Chicago) 1908-1928
- Arthur T. Walker (University of Kansas) 1909-1932
- Roy C. Flickinger (University of Iowa) 1928-1933
- J. O. Lofberg (Oberlin College) (died November 10, 1932)
- Walter Miller (University of Missouri) 1933-1935
- Eugene Tavenner (Washington University) 1935-1945
- Norman J. DeWitt (Washington University) 1945-1950
- Clyde Murley (Northwestern University) 1950-1955
- Phillip DeLacy (Washington University) 1955-1956
- Norman T. Pratt, Jr. (Indiana University) 1956-1961
- W. Robert Jones (Ohio State University) 1961-1968
- Roy Arthur Swanson (University of Wisconsin-Milwaukee) 1968-1973
- Harold D. Evjen (University of Colorado) 1973-1977
- Ernst A. Fredricksmeyer (University of Colorado) 1973-1976
- Hunter R. Rawlings, III (University of Colorado) 1977-1983
- W. W. de Grummond (Florida State University) 1983-1991
- John Miller (University of Virginia) 1991-1998
- Peter Knox (University of Colorado) 1998-2005
- S. Douglas Olson (University of Minnesota) 2005-2010
- Laurel Fulkerson (Florida State University) 2010-2016
- Antony Augoustakis (University of Illinois) 2016-2021
- Georgia Irby (College of William & Mary) 2021-

== Listserv and website ==
In May 2007, The Classical Journal began delivering online-exclusive book reviews, professional announcements, and supplemental material through the University of Minnesota's LISTSERV. Book reviews and the Online Forum are indexed at the journal's website.

== Ancestry of doctoral degrees wiki ==
The website also houses DIADOCHOI, a Wiki-style searchable database dedicated to the ancestry of doctoral degrees in classical studies and closely related fields.
