= List of humanities journals =

The following is a partial list of humanities journals, for academic study and research in the humanities There are thousands of humanities journals in publication, and many more have been published at various points in the past. The list given here is far from exhaustive, and contains only the most influential, currently publishing journals in each field. As a rule of thumb, each field should be represented by about 5 examples, chosen for their current academic importance.

Note: there are many important academic magazines that are not true peer-reviewed journals. They are not listed here.

== Archaeology ==
- American Journal of Archaeology
- Ancient Iranian Studies
- Australian Archaeology
- Babesch - Bulletin Antieke Beschaving
- Revue d'Égyptologie
- World Archaeology

== Art history ==
- Bijutsu Kenkyū
- Crossings
- Gentse Bijdragen tot de Interieurgeschiedenis

== Development studies ==
- Journal of International Development

== Linguistics ==
- Bulletin de la Société de Linguistique de Paris
- Cahiers de l'Institut de Linguistique de Louvain
- L'Information Grammaticale
- ITL – International Journal of Applied Linguistics

== Literature ==
- American Literary History
- Angelaki
- Diacritics
- Extrapolation
- Foundation – The International Review of Science Fiction
- Modern Fiction Studies
- Multi-Ethnic Literature of the United States
- Science-Fiction Studies

== Oriental studies ==
- Persica
- Revue des Études Arméniennes
- Jerusalem Studies in Arabic and Islam

== Medical humanities ==
- Research and Humanities in Medical Education
- Medical Humanities

== Music ==
- Early Music
- Indiana Theory Review
- Journal of Music Theory
- Music Analysis
- Music Theory Spectrum
- Perspectives of New Music

== Philosophy and ethics ==
- Angelaki
- Business and Professional Ethics Journal
- Business Ethics Quarterly
- Contemporary Pragmatism
- Philosophy, Psychiatry, & Psychology
- Revue Philosophique de Louvain
- Teaching Philosophy

== Semiotics ==
- The American Journal of Semiotics
- Semiotica
- Sign Systems Studies

== Theology and religious studies ==
- Cultic Studies Review
- Ephemerides Theologicae Lovanienses
- Hebraic Political Studies
- Nova Religio
- Religion
- Studia Islamika

== Jewish studies ==
- Revue des Études Juives
- The Jewish Quarterly Review
- Zion (journal)
- Tarbiz
- AJS Review

== General ==
- Topic: The Washington & Jefferson College Review

== Multidisciplinary humanities journals ==
- Angelaki
- Arkansas Review: A Journal of Delta Studies
- Arts and Humanities in Higher Education
- Daedalus
- Diacritics
- Digital Humanities Quarterly
- Ecumenica
- The European Legacy
- Fennia
- The German Quarterly
- Humanitas
- Huntington Library Quarterly
- Journal of Controversial Ideas
- Journal of the Royal Asiatic Society
- Katharsis
- Law, Culture and the Humanities
- Leonardo
- Leonardo Music Journal
- Literary and Linguistic Computing
- Medical Humanities
- Modernism/modernity
- Ñeʼẽ. Revista de Investigación Lingüística y Cultural
- Oral Tradition
- Pertanika Journal of Social Sciences & Humanities
- Proceedings of the British Academy
- Quarterly Journal of Speech
- Representations
- Studies in Iconography
- Topic: The Washington & Jefferson College Review
- University of Toronto Quarterly
- Utopian Studies
- Victorian Studies
- Yale Journal of Criticism
- Zambezia

== Digital humanities ==
- Digital Humanities Quarterly
- Digital Medievalist
- Digital Scholarship in the Humanities
- Southern Spaces

== See also ==
- List of history journals
