= List of women classicists =

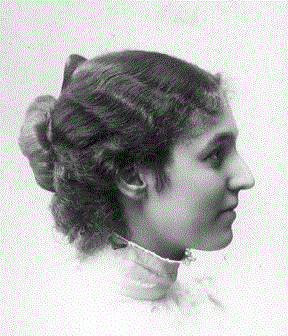
Ada Adler

Punch published a cartoon by George du Maurier about Agnata Ramsay's examination success.

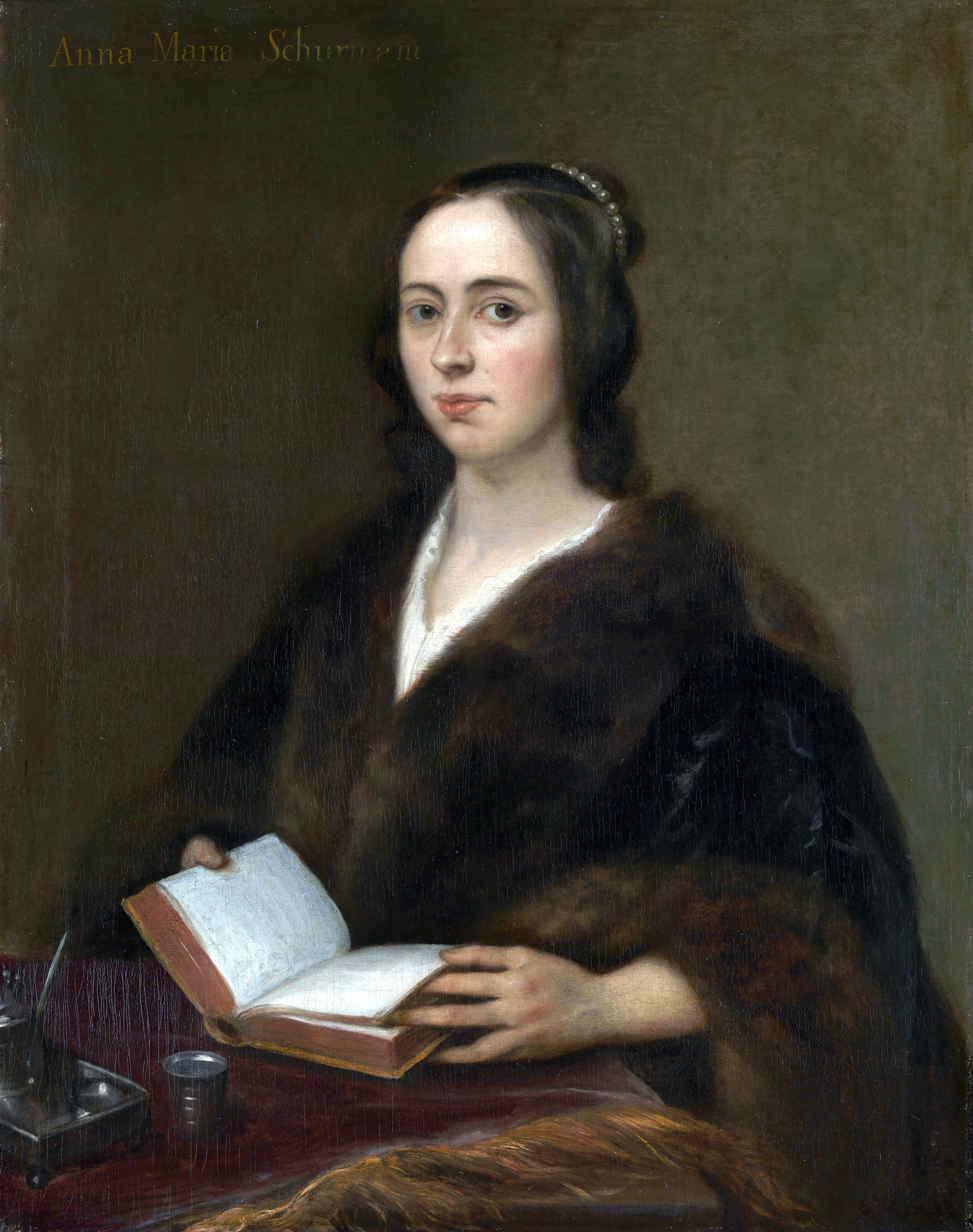
Anna Maria van Schurman by Jan Lievens

Madame Dacier by Marie Victoire Jaquotot

This is a list of women classicists – female scholars, translators and writers of classical antiquity, especially ancient Greece and ancient Rome.

== List ==
=== A ===
- Ada Adler, produced the definitive edition of the huge Byzantine lexicon, Suda
- Caroline Alexander, translator of the Iliad
- Margaret Alford

=== B ===
- Josephine Balmer
- Shadi Bartsch
- Lydia Baumbach
- Mary Beard, Cambridge don
- Marion Elizabeth Blake
- Mary Bridges-Adams
- Leslie Brubaker
- Anne Pippin Burnett
- Agnata Butler, first lady of Cambridge

=== C ===
- Averil Cameron, professor of Late Antique and Byzantine History, Warden of Keble College, Oxford
- Anne Carson, poet and translator
- Elizabeth Carter
- Carmen Castillo García Spanish classical philologist
- Helen Chesnutt
- Elizabeth A. Clark, professor specialising in patristics
- Kathleen Coleman
- Joan Breton Connelly
- Kate Cooper

=== D ===
- Anne Dacier, translator of Homer
- A. M. Dale, authority on Greek tragedy
- Cynthia Damon
- Suzanne Dixon

=== E ===
- Ulrike Egelhaaf-Gaiser
- Susanna Elm

=== F ===
- Wilhelmina Feemster Jashemski
- Sarah Fielding
- Helene P. Foley
- Kathleen Freeman, author and lecturer
- Olga Freidenberg

=== G ===
- Katharine Glasier
- Miriam Griffin

=== H ===
- Barbara Hammond, the first woman to take a double-first in Classical Moderations and Greats
- Henriette Harich-Schwarzbauer
- Elizabeth Hartley
- Elizabeth Hazelton Haight
- Edith Hamilton
- Mary Hamilton
- Susan Ashbrook Harvey
- Jane Harrison
- Gertrude Hirst
- Lucy Hutchinson, translator of Lucretius

=== K ===
- Marion Kennedy, founder member of Newnham College
- Helen King
- Alice Kober, deciphered Linear B
- Elfriede Knauer
- Leslie Kurke
- Donna Carol Kurtz

=== L ===
- Abby Leach, professor of Greek and Latin at Vassar
- Mary Lefkowitz
- Janet Lembke
- Barbara Levick
- Jane Lightfoot, professor of Greek literature at the University of Oxford
- Lady Jane Lumley, translator of Euripides

=== M ===
- Grace Macurdy
- Bathsua Makin, learned lady
- Carolina Michaëlis de Vasconcelos, first female professor of Romance studies at the University of Lisbon
- Agnes Kirsopp Lake Michels
- Lucy Myers Wright Mitchell
- Judith Mossman

=== N ===
- Andrea Nightingale

=== P ===
- Germaine Perrin de la Boullaye
- Yopie Prins
- Emily James Smith Putnam

=== R ===
- Nancy Sorkin Rabinowitz
- Betty Radice, editor of Penguin Classics
- Sarah Parker Remond
- Christiane Reitz
- Emeline Hill Richardson
- Amy Richlin, authority on ancient sex
- Deborah Roberts
- Jacqueline de Romilly
- Ursula Rothe
- Ingrid D. Rowland
- Sarah Ruden, translator of the Aeneid
- Meike Rühl

=== S ===
- Anna Maria van Schurman, the first female university student
- Ruth Scodel
- Enid Stacy
- Edith Sharpley
- Gertrude Smith
- Alicia Stallings, poet and translator
- Jenny Strauss Clay
- Anna Swanwick, promoter of higher education for women

=== T ===
- Clotilde Tambroni*Birgitte Thott, translator of Seneca
- Dorothy Tarrant, first female UK professor of Greek
- Lily Ross Taylor
- Gail Trimble
- Susan Treggiari
- Bluma L. Trell (1903–1997), New York University

=== V ===
- Luisa Sigea de Velasco
- Margaret Verrall
- Elizabeth Visser
- Renée Vivien

=== W ===
- Ute Wartenberg
- Simone Weil
- Mary Estelle White
- Marie Victoria Williams
- Emily Wilson
- Anja Wolkenhauer

=== Y ===
- Louise Youtie, papyrologist

=== Z ===
- Annie Nicolette Zadoks Josephus Jitta
- Froma Zeitlin
