= Youtie =

Youtie is a surname. Notable people with the surname include:

- Herbert Youtie (1904–1980), American papyrologist
- Louise Youtie (1909–2004), American papyrologist
