= Islamic studies =

Academic study of Islam, Islamic civilizations and their impact on the world

Islamic studies is the academic study of Islam, which is analogous to related fields such as Jewish studies and Quranic studies. Islamic studies seeks to understand the past and the potential future of the Islamic world. In this multidisciplinary program, scholars from diverse areas (history, culture, literature, art) participate and exchange ideas pertaining to the particular field of study.

Generations of scholars in Islamic studies, most of whom studied with Orientalist mentors, helped bridge the gap between Orientalism and Religious studies. The subfield that grew out of this effort is called "Islamic studies." The study of Islam is part of a tradition that started in Western academia on a professional scale about two centuries ago, and has been previously linked to social concern. This academic tradition has not only led to an accumulation of knowledge, even if some of it is almost forgotten or badly neglected, but has also witnessed major changes in interests, questions, methods, aesthetics, and ethics of Islam.

Many academic Islamic studies programs include the historical study of Islam, Islamic civilization, history of the Muslim world, historiography, Islamic law, Islamic theology and Islamic philosophy. Specialists in Islamic studies concentrate on the detailed, academic study of texts written in Arabic within the fields of Islamic theology, Islamic law, and the Qur'an and Hadith along with ancillary disciplines such as Tafsir or Qur'an Exegesis. However, they also often apply the methods adapted from several ancillary fields, ranging from Biblical studies and classical philology to modern history, legal history and sociology.

== Overview ==
Scholars in the field of Islamic studies are often referred to as "Islamicists" and the discipline traditionally made up the bulk of what used to be called Oriental studies. The transitional generation of Islamicists were betwixt and between an era when Islamic studies were dominated by Orientalism and the post-Orientalist era of post-colonial criticism and critical theory in the social sciences and much of religious studies. In fact, some of the more traditional Western universities still confer degrees in Arabic and Islamic studies under the primary title of "Oriental studies". This is the case, for example, at the University of Oxford, where classical Arabic and Islamic studies have been taught since as early as the 16th century, originally as a sub-division of divinity. This latter context gave early academic Islamic studies its Biblical studies character and was also a consequence of the fact that, throughout early-modern Western Europe, the discipline was developed by churchmen whose primary aim had been to refute the tenets of Islam. Today, academic Islamic studies is usually taught and studied alongside or after an extensive study of the Arabic language, with named undergraduate and graduate degrees in Arabic and Islamic studies existing at universities such as Georgetown, Exeter, Oxford, Leeds, SOAS (London), Yale, Leiden and Tübingen.

A recent HEFCE report emphasises the increasing, strategic importance for Western governments since 9/11 of Islamic studies in higher education and also provides an international overview of the state of the field. With the events of 11 September 2001, Islam occupies a relevant stage in world politics.

== History ==
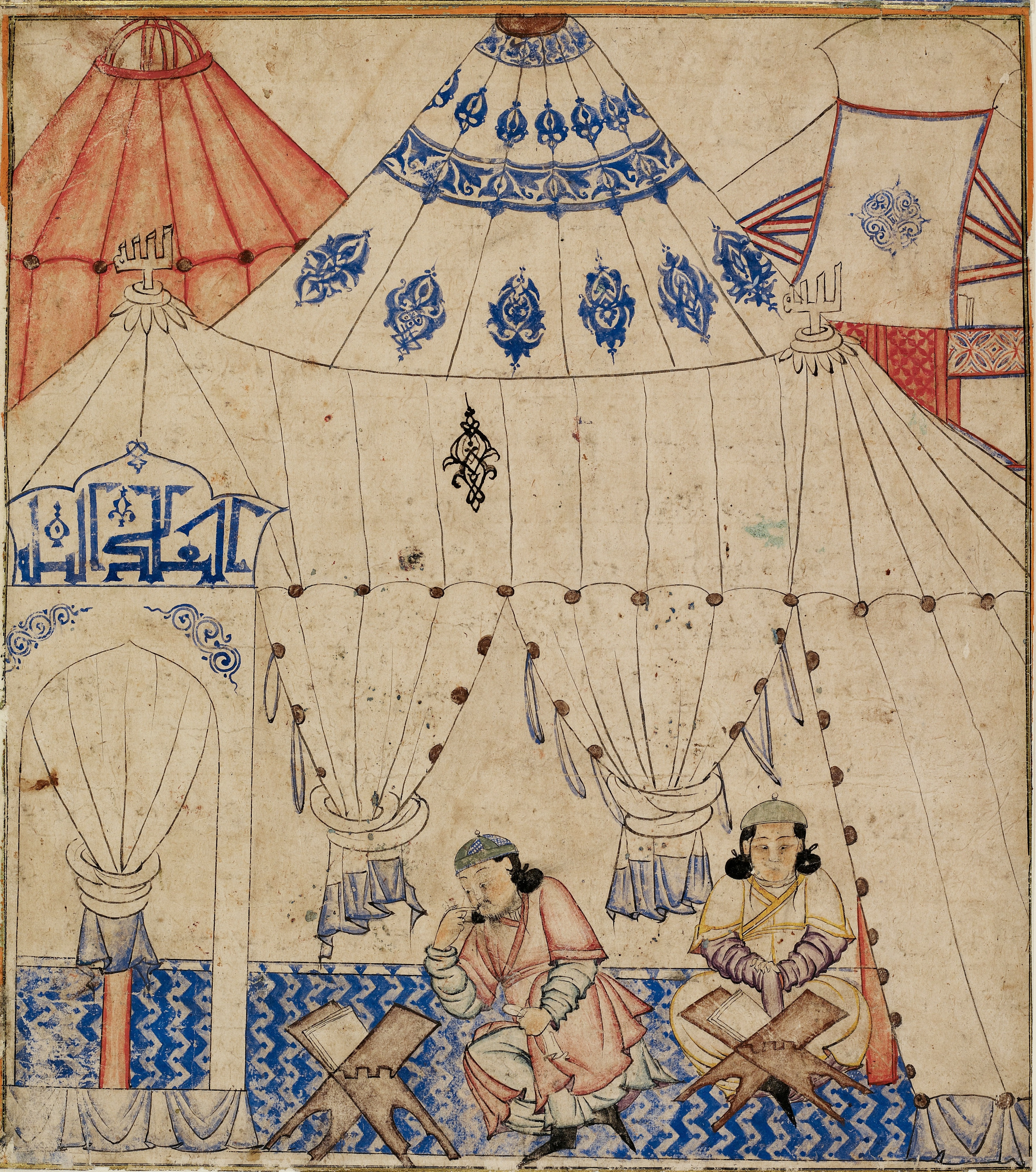
Ilkhanate Empire ruler, Ghazan, studying the Quran

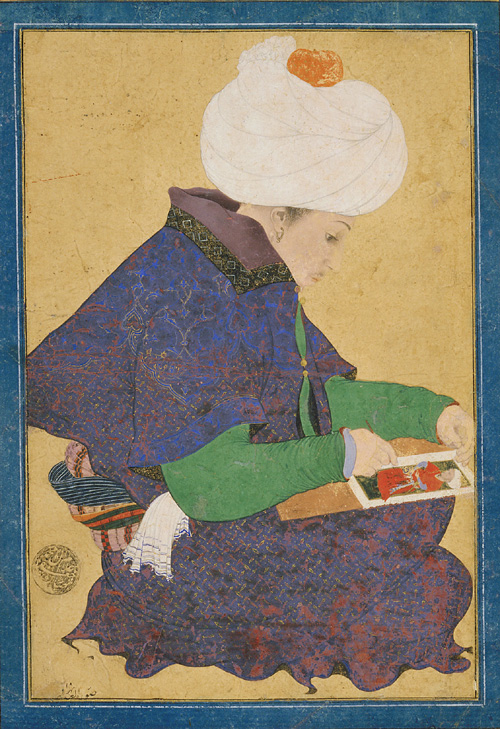
Portrait of a painter during Reign of Mehmet II (1444-1481)

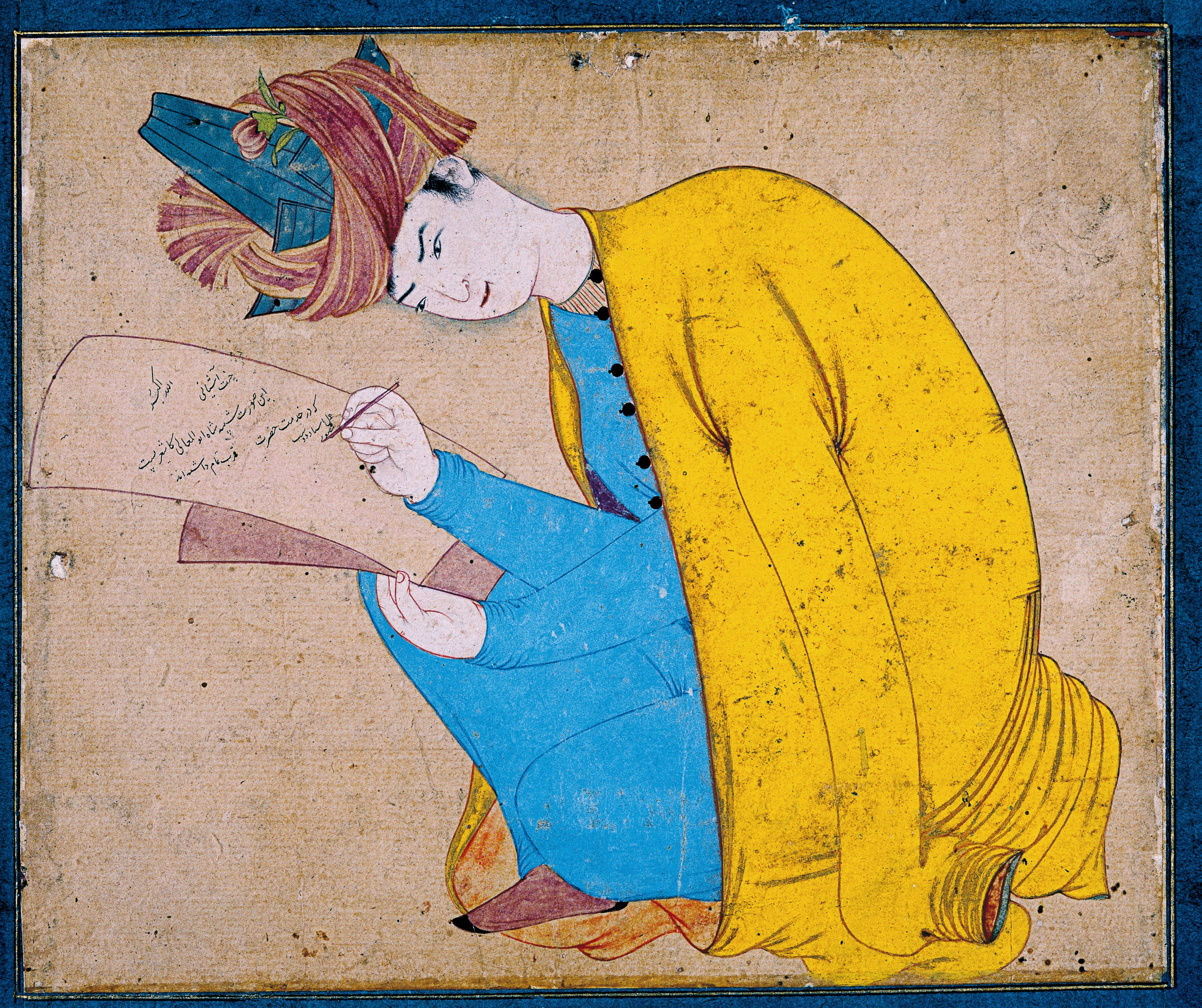
A Persian miniature of Shah Abu'l Ma'ali, a scholar.

In Islamic Studies, there is a tendency to rely on history (as method and approach) as a reassuring scientific framework. However nowadays, besides recurrent debates within history itself, many scientists look unfavorably at a linear conception of time (Rovelli 2018).

The first attempt to understand Islam as a topic of modern scholarship (as opposed to a Christological heresy) was within the context of 19th-century Christian European Oriental studies. Examining and understanding this kind of Islam – a heterogeneous living tradition with some non-discursive elements, which is internally extremely dynamic and multifaceted – is the purview of Islamic studies in the modern world.

In the years 1821 to 1850, the Royal Asiatic Society in England, the Société Asiatique in France, the Deutsche Morgenländische Gesellschaft in Germany, and the American Oriental Society in the United States were founded.

In the second half of the 19th century, philological and historical approaches were predominant. Leading in the field were German researchers like Theodore Nöldeke with his Geschichte des Qorāns (History of the Quran), and Ignaz Goldziher 's work on hadith (Muslim Studies).

Orientalists and Islamic scholars alike preferred to interpret the history of Islam in a conservative way. They did not question the traditional account of the early time of Islam, of Muhammad and how the Quran was written.

In the 1970s, the Revisionist School of Islamic Studies questioned the uncritical adherence to traditional Islamic sources and started to develop a new picture of the earliest times of Islam by applying the historical-critical method.

== Themes ==
=== History of Islam ===
To understand the history of Islam provides the indispensable basis to understand all aspects of Islam and its culture. Themes of special interest are:

- Historiography of early Islam
- History of the Quran
- Historicity of Muhammad
- Early Muslim conquests

=== Textual Studies ===
- Quranic studies
- Hadith studies
- Fiqh studies

=== Gender Textual Studies ===
The history of women and gender in Islamic studies experienced a surge of scholarly research during the early 1990's. This wave of scholarship was influenced by the growing presence of politically and religiously active women scholars with Muslim and Arab backgrounds. Additionally, there was a notable increase in the utilization of gender studies methodologies within the traditionally conservative realms of Islamic history and law.

Works such as Leila Ahmed's Women and Gender in Islam (1992), Fatima Mernissi's The Veil and the Male Elite (first published in English in 1991, translated from a 1987 French original), and Fedwa Malti-Douglas's Woman's Body, Woman's Word: Gender and Discourse in Arabo-Islamic Writing (1991) surveyed large swathes of Islamic history and thought, suggesting structural connections between gendered religious discourses and the social and political roles and rights of women over time.

The work from this era sparked a significant amount of academic research in that, in the subsequent twenty years, not only expanded and detailed the arguments put forth by these scholars, but also analyzed and improved upon their methodologies. Recent years have seen a shift towards utilizing a broader range of sources and developing more intricate interpretive frameworks, some of which have even challenged the idea of a uniform Islamic gender discourse. Following the impactful comprehensive syntheses of the early 1990's, more in-depth and context-specific studies have delved into social customs, religious beliefs, and the interplay between the two.

=== Theology ===
- Kalam – Islamic studies of theology often include study of the traditional science of Kalâm
- Islamic eschatology

=== Mysticism ===
Sufism (تصوف taṣawwuf) is a mystic tradition of Islam based on the pursuit of spiritual truth as it is gradually revealed to the heart and mind of the Sufi (one who practices Sufism).According to Renard (2021) quoted by Green the meaning of Sufism is "a strong method of Muslim's knowledge and practice bringing proximity to or meditation with God and believed that it came from Prophet Muhammad from generation to generation who followed him" (P.8). The etymological term Suf has mysticism to the educational notion of asceticism. The ascetics and mystics have different and separate roles in each setting, and everyone needs to search the context of a given Sufi's own time for reasons as to why he/she was known as a Sufi. Sufism is not that, they do not follow the Islam properly it's just that they spend more time with God. It is an individual way of studying.

It might also be referred to as Islamic mysticism. While other branches of Islam generally focus on exoteric aspects of religion, Sufism is mainly focused on the direct perception of truth or God through mystic practices based on divine love. Sufism embodies a number of cultures, philosophies, central teachings and bodies of esoteric knowledge.

=== Kalam ===
Kalām emerged as a discipline in response to political disputes among Muslims, and then later in response to the impact of Hellenistic philosophy and the expansion of the Islamic Empire into territories previously dominated and occupied by the Sassanian and Byzantine Empires. Thus, one of the first and persistent questions challenging the Islamic community was the status of a believer who committed grave sins.

=== Law ===
The term "Islamic law" would in itself be an example of such a holistic merging of two spheres, conflating a person's faith with his rights, or even three, if "law" is seen as a natural aspect of state politics that in a modern differentiated system should not be separated from religion, in its institutions and its rules.

Islamic jurisprudence relates to everyday and social issues in the life of Muslims. It is divided in fields like:

- the study of sharia
- Islamic economics
- Qur'an and Hadith studies

Key distinctions include those between fiqh, hadith and ijtihad.

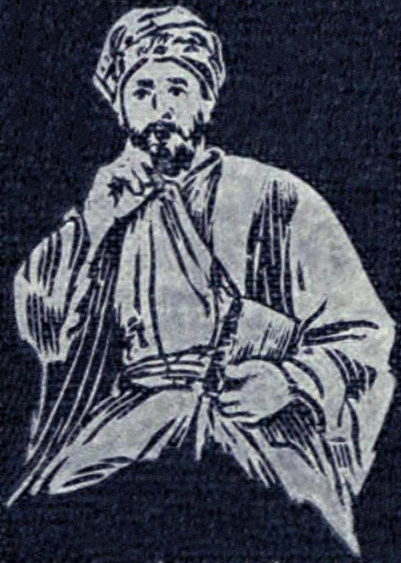
Al-Ghazali, Muslim Philosopher (1058-1111)

=== Philosophy ===
Islamic studies scholars also deal with the long and rich tradition of philosophy as developed by Muslim philosophers.

It is divided in fields like:

- Early Islamic philosophy
  - Avicennism
  - Averroism
- Islamic philosophy
- Modern Islamic philosophy
  - Sufi philosophy
  - Transcendent theosophy
- List of Muslim philosophers
- Illuminationist philosophy
- Islamic ethics
- Sufi metaphysics

=== Sciences ===
Islamic studies scholars are also active in the history and philosophy of science. Significant progress in science was made in the Muslim world during the Middle Ages, especially during the Islamic Golden Age, which is considered a major period in the history of science.

- Timeline of Islamic science and engineering
- Alchemy and chemistry in medieval Islam
- Astronomy in medieval Islam
  - Islamic astrology
- Inventions in medieval Islam
- Mathematics in medieval Islam
- Medicine in medieval Islam
  - Ophthalmology in medieval Islam
- Physics in medieval Islam
- Psychology in medieval Islam

Scholars also study the relationship between Islam and science, for example in the application of Islamic ethics to scientific practice.

- Qur'an and science
- Islamic creationism

=== Literature ===
The Jamia Qurania Arabia Lalbagh institute in Bangladesh has a large stock of Islamic literature in Arabic, Bengali, Persian and Urdu.

- Arabic literature
  - Arabic epic literature
- Islamic poetry
  - Arabic poetry
- Persian literature
- Urdu literature

This field includes the study of modern and classical Arabic and the literature written in those languages. It also often includes other modern, classic or ancient languages of the Middle East and other areas that are or have been part of, or influenced by, Islamic culture, such as Hebrew, Turkish, Persian, Urdu, Azerbaijanian and Uzbek.

=== Architecture ===
Islamic architecture is the entire range of architecture that has evolved within Muslim culture in the course of the history of Islam. Hence the term encompasses religious buildings as well as secular ones, historic as well as modern expressions and the production of all places that have come under the varying levels of Islamic influence.

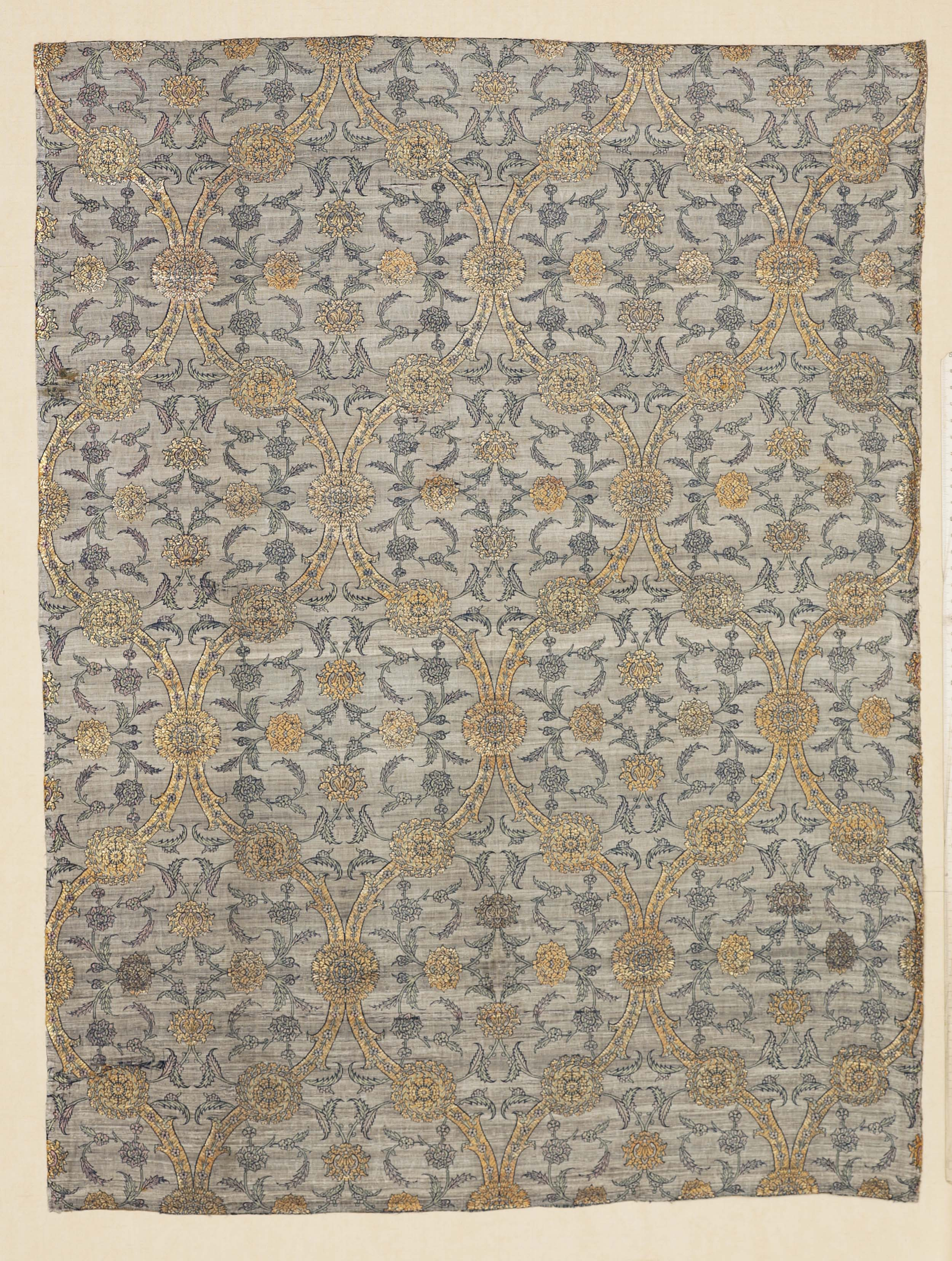
Islamic Art Textile, Khalili Collection

=== Art ===
- Islamic calligraphy
- Islamic pottery
- Muslim music

Islamic visual art has, throughout history, been mainly abstract and decorative, portraying geometric, floral, Arabesque, and calligraphic designs. Unlike the strong tradition of portraying the human figure in Christian art, Islamic art is typically distinguished as not including depictions of human beings. The lack of portraiture is due to the fact that early Islam forbade the painting of human beings, especially the Prophet, as Muslims believe this tempts followers of the Prophet to idolatry. This prohibition against human beings or icons is called aniconism. Despite such a prohibition, depictions of human beings do occur in Islamic art, such as that of the Mughals, demonstrating a strong diversity in popular interpretation over the pre-modern period. Increased contact with the Western civilization may also have contributed to human depictions in Islamic art in modern times.

=== Comparative religion ===
Islamic comparative religion is the study of the relationship between Islam and other religions.

- Islam and Christianity
- Islam and Jainism
- Islam and Judaism
  - Judeo-Islamic philosophies (800 - 1400)

=== Economics ===
Islamic economics studies how economics may be brought in accordance with Islamic law.

- Islamic banking
- Islamic economics in the world

=== Psychology ===
- Psychology in medieval Islam
- Sufi psychology

=== Islam and modernity ===
One field of study deals with how Islam reacts on the contact with Western modernity.

- Al-Nahda
- Islam and modernity
- Liberal and progressive Muslim movements

== Journals ==
- Die Welt des Islams (Brill)
- Islamic Law and Society (Brill)
- Islam and Christian-Muslim Relations (Routledge)
- Jerusalem Studies in Arabic and Islam (The Max Schloessinger Memorial Foundation, The Hebrew University of Jerusalem)
- Journal of Arabic and Islamic Studies open access (Lancaster University)
- Journal of Islamic Studies (Oxford University Press)
- Hakeem Al Hind (Sree Sankaracharya University of Sanskrit Kerala, India)
- Al Mahara (Maharajas College, Kochin, India)
- The Muslim World (Blackwell Publishing)
- Studia Islamica (Maisonneuve & Larose)
- Pax Islamica (Mardjani Publishing House)
- Journal of Islam in Asia (International Islamic University Malaysia)
- Al-Qantara (Spanish National Research Council)
- Journal of Shi'a Islamic Studies (The Islamic College)
- Studia Islamika (Center for the Study of Islam and Society (PPIM) Syarif Hidayatullah State Islamic University of Jakarta, INDONESIA)
- American Journal of Islam and Society, International Institute of Islamic Thought (IIIT), USA.

== See also ==
- Arab studies
- Middle Eastern studies
- Glossary of Islam
- List of non-Muslim authors on Islam

== Bibliography ==
- Yılmaz, Halil İbrahim; İzgi, Mahmut Cihat; Erbay, Enes Ensar; Şenel, Samet (2024). "Studying early Islam in the third millennium: a bibliometric analysis". Humanities and Social Sciences Communications. 11 (1) 1521. doi:10.1057/s41599-024-04058-2. hdl:11552/7918.
- Azim Nanji, ed. (1997). Mapping Islamic Studies: Genealogy, Continuity and Change. Walter de Gruyter. ISBN 978-3-11-081168-1.
- Islamic Studies in the Twenty-first Century: Transformations and Continuities. Netherlands, Amsterdam University Press, 2016, ISBN 9789089649263.
- [Saeed, Abu Hayyan, History of Quran and Orientalists. (December 1, 2023). Available at SSRN: https://ssrn.com/abstract=4651867 or http://dx.doi.org/10.2139/ssrn.4651867]
