= L. Bouke van der Meer =

Dutch classical archaeologist (born 1945)

Lammert Bouke van der Meer
- Born: 4 October 1945 (age 80); Leeuwarden, Friesland, The Netherlands
- Education: University of Groningen (PhD)

Lammert Bouke van der Meer (born 1945) is a Dutch classicist and classical archaeologist specialized in Etruscology. He studied classics and archaeology at the University of Groningen, and received his PhD from the same university in 1978 with a dissertation entitled Etruscan urns from Volterra. Studies on mythological representations, I-II (supervised by A.N. Zadoks-Josephus Jitta). Van der Meer is retired associate professor of Classical Archaeology at Leiden University.

Van der Meer is a leading authority on Etruscan religion. He published several books and numerous articles on Etruscan origins, Etruscan language, Etruscan mirrors, the Liber Linteus Zagrabiensis, the liver of Piacenza, cinerary urns from Volterra, sarcophagi and the Etruscan collection in the Dutch National Museum of Antiquities. He is also a member of the Istituto Nazionale di Studi Etruschi ed Italici in Florence and the editorial board of the archaeological journal BABESCH.

== Selected works ==
=== Books ===
- Etrusco Ritu. Case studies in Etruscan ritual behaviour (2011)
- Liber Linteus Zagrabiensis. The linen book of Zagreb. A comment on the longest Etruscan text (2007)
- Myths and more. On Etruscan stone sarcophagi, ca. 350-200 B.C. (2004)
- Interpretatio Etrusca. Greek myths on Etruscan mirrors (1995)
- (with Robert Beekes), De Etrusken spreken (1991)
- The bronze liver of Piacenza. Analysis of a polytheistic structure (1987)
- Corpus speculorum Etruscorum: The Netherlands (1983)
- Etruscan urns from volterra. Studies on mythological representations (1978)
- (editor) De Etrusken. Inleiding tot de verzameling Etruskische oudheden in het Rijksmuseum van Oudheden te Leiden (1977)
