= Henry Maguire =

English art historian (born 1943)

- Born: 1943 (age 82–83); Bath, Somerset, England
- Title: Professor Emeritus

Academic background
- Education: King's College, Cambridge; The Courtauld Institute of Art; Harvard University

Academic work
- Discipline: History of Art

Henry P. Maguire (born 1943) is an English art historian, specialising in Byzantine art, and Professor Emeritus at Johns Hopkins Krieger School of Arts and Sciences in the History of Art Department. Between 1991-1996, he was Director of Byzantine Studies at Dumbarton Oaks, a research institute of Harvard University.

In 2020, a collection of essays were published in honor of Maguire, The Eloquence of Art: Essays in Honour of Henry Maguire, edited by Andrea Olsen Lam and Rossitza Schroeder (New York: Routledge, ISBN 0815394594).

== Early life and education ==
Maguire was born in Bath, England in 1943. In 1962 he attended King's College, Cambridge for undergraduate study where he spent one year studying archaeology and anthropology, later transferring to art history. He completed his graduate studies on the Bliss Fellowship, divided between one year each at the Courtauld Institute of Art and Harvard University. He has a special interest in Byzantine art and has published extensively.

== Professional service and memberships ==
He is currently a Professor Emeritus at Johns Hopkins Krieger School of Arts and Sciences in the History of Art Department, having taught at Johns Hopkins from 2000 to 2010. He worked at the University of Illinois, Urbana-Champaign from 1979 - 2000. He held a joint appointment as assistant professor at the Dumbarton Oaks institute at Harvard University from 1973-1979. In the early 1970s, he held a position at the University of Massachusetts.

At Dumbarton Oaks, Henry Maguire was a Junior Fellow (1971–1972), a Senior Fellow (1986–1990 and 1991–1996 ex officio), and Visiting Senior Research Associate (1989–1990) of Byzantine Studies; he was Director of Byzantine Studies (1991–1996).

In 2003, Maguire was Croghan Bicentennial Visiting Professor of Art History at Williams College, Massachusetts.

== Selected works ==
=== Books and edited collections ===
- The Paintings of the Panagia tou Arakos. Art, Intercession and Theology. Nicosia: The Anastasios G. Leventis Foundation, 2019. ISBN 9789963732395
- Nature in the Byzantine Art of Cyprus: 24th Annual Lecture in Memory of Constantinos Leventis, 17 November 2015. Nicosia: The Anastasios G. Leventis Foundation, 2016.
- Nectar and Illusion: Nature in Byzantine Art and Literature. Princeton: Princeton University Press, 2012. ISBN 978-0-19-049710-1
- Image and Imagination in Byzantine Art. Aldershot and Burlington: Ashgate Variorum, 2007. ISBN 978-1138375086
- With A. Terry. Dynamic Splendor: The Wall Mosaics in the Cathedral of Efrasius at Porec. 2 Vols. University Park: Pennsylvania State University Press, 2007. ISBN 9780271028736
- With Eunice Dauterman Maguire. Other Icons: Art and Power in Byzantine Secular Culture. Princeton University Press, 2007. ISBN 978-0691125640
- Rhetoric, Nature and Magic in Byzantine Art. Aldershot and Brookfield: Ashgate, 1998. ISBN 086078634X
- Icons of Their Bodies: Saints and Their Images in Byzantium. Princeton: Princeton University Press, 1996. ISBN 0691050074
- Image and Imagination: The Byzantine Epigram as Evidence for Viewer Response. Toronto: Canadian Institute for Balkan Studies, 1996.
- Earth and Ocean: The Terrestrial World in Early Byzantine Art. University Park: Pennsylvania University press, 1987. ISBN 0271004770
- With Eunice Dauterman Maguire and M.J. Duncan-Flowers. Art and Holy Powers in the Early Christian House. Urbana: University of Illinois Press, 1989. ISBN 978-0252060953
- Art and Eloquence in Byzantium. Princeton: Princeton University Press, 1981. ISBN 978-0691036939

== Archival collections ==
Maguire and Eunice Dauterman Maguire's collection of books is held at the ANAMED Special Collection Library, at the Koç University Research Center for Anatolian Civilizations, in Istanbul. According to ANAMED, the collection "consists of approximately 1,500 volumes of 20th-century to the present hardbacks, paperbacks, and periodicals pertaining to Byzantine art, culture, and related topics".

Photographs by Henry Maguire are held in the Conway Library at the Courtauld Institute of Art. The photographs are currently being digitised as part of the Courtauld Connects project.

== Personal life ==
Maguire is married to Eunice Dauterman Maguire. Eunice is also a Byzantium scholar and studied alongside her husband at Harvard under the same supervisor, Ernst Kitzinger. She was curator of the Johns Hopkins University Archaeological Collection and Senior Lecturer in Art History, having formerly been the curator of the Krannert Art Museum at the University of Illinois, Urbana-Champaign.

Henry and Eunice have co-authored multiple volumes, including Other Icons: Art and Power in Byzantine Secular Culture (2007). Reviewing Other Icons, in Studies in Iconography journal, Maria G. Parani of the University of Cyprus praised the book for "shed[ding] light on aspects of Byzantine artistic expression beyond the reserves of church and state". Parani notes that "the interest of Eunice and Henry Maguire in the study of Byzantine secular culture is wide-ranging, long-standing, and widely acknowledged".

Their son, Gavin, was born in the 1960s.
