= Bijutsu Kenkyū =

- Discipline: Art history
- Language: Japanese

Publication details
- History: 1932-present
- Publisher: Tokyo Research Institute for Cultural Properties (Japan)
- Frequency: Triannually

Standard abbreviations
- ISO 4: Bijutsu Kenkyū

Indexing
- ISSN: 0021-9088
- LCCN: 34012319
- OCLC no.: 1532940

Links
- Journal homepage

Bijutsu Kenkyū (美術研究) (lit. 'Art Research') is a triannual academic journal of art history, with a particular focus upon Japanese art. The journal is published in Japanese, with summaries in English, by the Tokyo Research Institute for Cultural Properties. The publication is also known as The Journal of Art Studies.

== See also ==
- Hozon Kagaku
- Bijutsu-shi
