= Katarsis =

Katarsis may refer to:

- Katarsis (film), a 1963 Italian horror film
- Katarsis (band), Lithuanian rock band formed in 2019

== See also ==
- Catarsis, a 2013 studio album by Spanish-Mexican singer-songwriter Belinda
- Katharsis (disambiguation)
