= JCI =

JCI may refer to:

- Jakarta Composite Index of Indonesia Stock Exchange (see JSX Composite)
- JCI Limited or Johannesburg Consolidated Investment Company Limited, formed in 1889 and later split into Anglo American Platinum, Johnnic, and JCI Gold
- Johnson Controls Inc., a producer of automotive systems, automotive batteries and climate control systems
- Joint Commission International, a US-based organization for healthcare accreditation
- Journal citation indicator, a measure of academic journal influence
- Journal of Clinical Investigation, a journal that publishes biomedical research and reviews
- Journal of Controversial Ideas, an academic journal
- Junior Chamber International, a worldwide community of young active citizens
- Juventud Comunista Ibérica, (Iberian Communist Youth), youth wing of the Iberian Communist Federation
- The IATA code for New Century AirCenter, formerly Johnson County Industrial Airport, in Olathe, Kansas
