= Catharsis (disambiguation) =

Catharsis is Greek word meaning "cleansing" or "purging".

Catharsis may also refer to:

== Music ==
- Catharsis (Russian band), a Russian metal band
- Catharsis (American band), an American anarchist hardcore punk band

=== Albums ===
- Catharsis (Elis album), 2009
- Catharsis (Machine Head album) or the title song, 2018
- Catharsis (Yob album) or the title song, 2003
- Catharsis (Covet album), 2023
- Catharsis, by Fingertips, 2006
- Catharsis, by Közi, 2004
- Catharsis, by Sky-Hi, 2016
- Catharsis, an EP by Sworn In, 2011
- Catharsis (Fola album), 2025

=== Songs ===
- "Catharsis", by Anthrax from Volume 8: The Threat Is Real, 1998
- "Catharsis", by Apocalyptica from Cell-0, 2020
- "Catharsis", by Band-Maid from Conqueror, 2019
- "Catharsis", by Motionless in White from Disguise, 2019
- "Catharsis", by Pitchshifter from Industrial, 1991
- "Catharsis", by Versailles from Jubilee, 2010

== Other uses ==
- Catharsis (medicine), the effect of a cathartic, a substance that accelerates defecation
- Catharsis (organization), a charitable organization in Tbilisi, Georgia

== See also ==
- Katharsis (disambiguation)
- Catharisis, a 2003 Japanese TV film
