= Jean-Marie-Nicolas Lucas de Montigny =

French magistrate

Jean-Marie-Nicolas Lucas de Montigny (10 February 1782 - 24 January 1852) was a French politician.

== Life ==
Nicknamed Coco or Gabriel and nominally the son of the sculptor Jean-Robert-Nicolas Lucas de Montigny and Edmée Adélaïde Baignières (1750-1796), he was most probably the biological son of Mirabeau after an affair with Edmée. He spent much of his childhood being raised in Mirabeau's household and was taken with him to Germany.

On Mirabeau's death in 1791 and Madame de Saillant's death in 1821, he inherited a huge fortune, including documents and artworks from Mirabeau's collection, continuing to expand it for the rest of his life, acquiring Mirabeau's château near Marseille in 1816 and published Mirabeau's Mémoires biographiques in 1834. A protégé of Mirabeau's friend Frochot, who became prefect of the Seine under the First French Empire, Jean-Marie-Nicolas had a major administrative career and became president of the Conseil de préfecture de la Seine before being appointed conseiller d'État just before his death on 24 January 1853.
