= Annie Nicolette Zadoks-Josephus Jitta =

Dutch numismatist

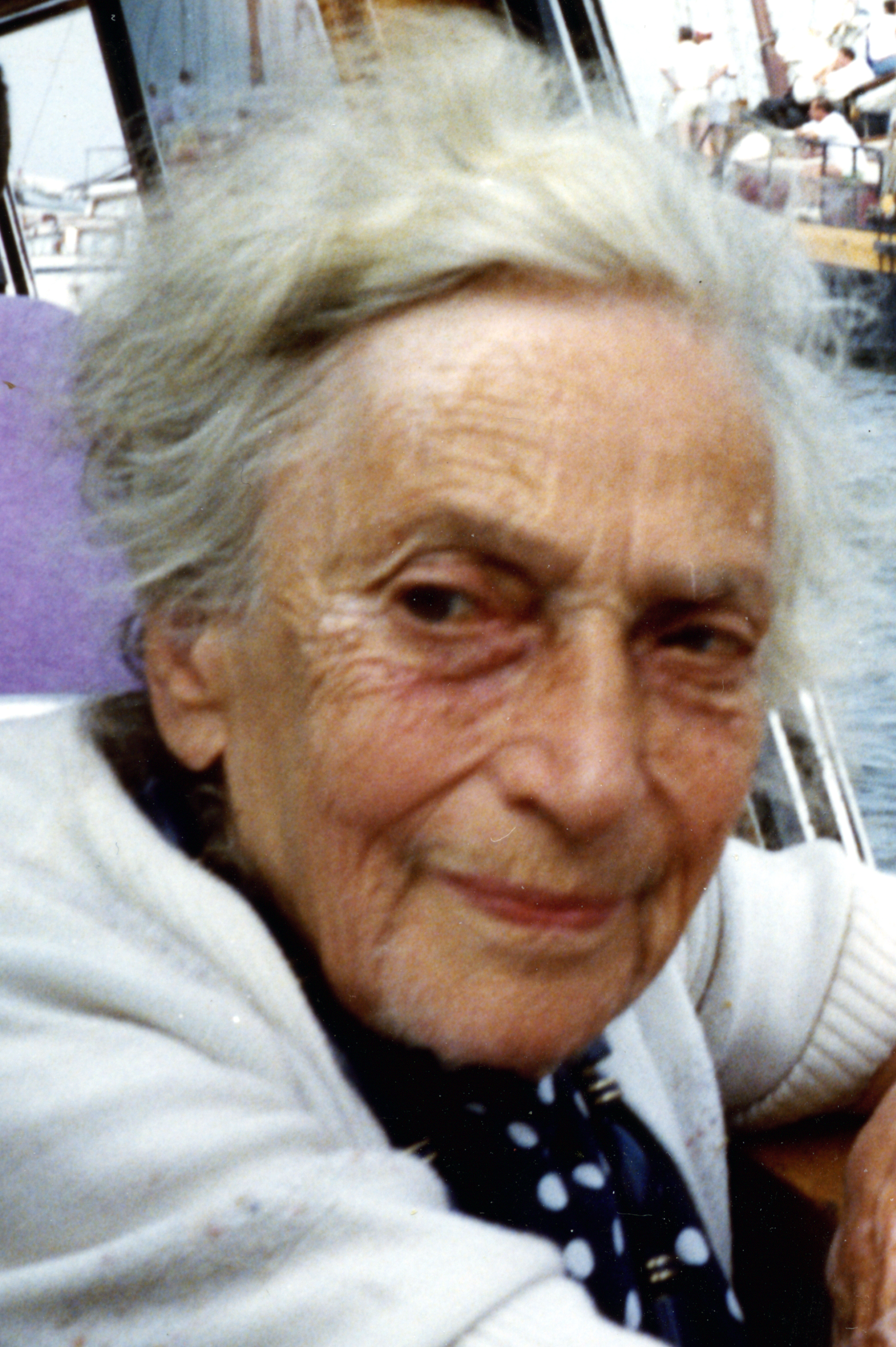
- Annie Zadoks-Josephus Jitta, 1984
- Born: Annie Nicolette Josephus Jitta; 1904; Amsterdam, Netherlands
- Died: 31 May 2000; Amsterdam, Netherlands
- Occupations: Conservator and numismatist
- Known for: Development of classical archaeology and numismatics in the Netherlands

childhood portrait in oils by Hendrik Maarten Krabbé

Annie Nicolette Zadoks-Josephus Jitta (December 1904 – 31 May 2000) was a Dutch numismatist and archaeologist.

== Early life and education ==
Annie Nicolette Josephus Jitta was born in Amsterdam in 1904. Her Jewish family originated in Bamberg in Bavaria, but moved to Amsterdam in 1812, where her ancestor Nathan Joseph adopted the surname Jitta in response to Louis Bonaparte's edict that all inhabitants of the Low Countries should be registered with a family name. She attended schools in Amsterdam (Meisjeslyceum), Utrecht and The Hague, before taking an art history degree at the University of Leiden. She gained her PhD in 1932 under the supervision of Professor G. A. S. Snijder. It formed the basis for her book Ancestral portraiture in Rome and the art of the last century of the Republic.

After taking her first degree exams, Josephus Jitta married Amsterdam-born Jewish lawyer Carel Zadoks. Despite his membership of the National Socialist Movement in the Netherlands, he died in the Amersfoort concentration camp in 1942. Their son Jan Carel spent the war years in Friesland, while Zadoks-Josephus Jitta herself worked at the Colonial Institute of Amsterdam. Her unusual name inspired Dutch journalist Theo Toebosch to research the Josephus Jitta family after seeing it on the cover of her book Antieke cultuur in beeld as a schoolboy many years earlier. Whilst taking his degree in classical languages and archaeology in Amsterdam, he remembers seeing Zadoks-Josephus Jitta walking around on campus, invariably accompanied by her dog. His book about the family, Uitverkoren Zondebokken (Selected Scapegoats), was published in 2010.

== Academic career ==
From 1 May 1948 until 1 January 1963, Zadoks-Josephus Jitta worked as part-time conservator of ancient coins and cut gems at the Koninklijk Penningkabinet, then located in The Hague. She then became a lecturer in classical archaeology at the University of Groningen. Prior to this appointment she had been lector in archaeology for many years, following the retirement of archaeologist G. van Hoorn in 1951 and the departure of his replacement G. H. Beyen soon after. Her initial appointment as a lecturer was for a fixed term of five years, in view of her background as an archaeologist and art historian rather than the more traditional foundation of classical philology. She published ten books and more than two hundred articles, and is credited with changing the face of classical archaeology in the Netherlands. She is also credited with stimulating the still nascent discipline of formal numismatic study in the Netherlands, particularly the work of Wim van Es. Her work inspired the publication of a Festschrift on the occasion of her 70th birthday, with a foreword and praise of her work by Elizabeth Visser (1908–1987), the first female professor of ancient history in the Netherlands.

== Selected works ==
- — (1932). Ancestral portraiture in Rome and the art of the last century of the Republic. Archaeologisch-historische bijdragen 1. Amsterdam: Noord-Hollandsche Uitgeverij.
- — (1937). "Vroeg-republikeinsche fragmenten". Mededeelingen van het Nederlandsch Historisch Instituut te Rome. 2nd series. 7.
- — (1937). "The Poseidon isthmios by Lysippos". Journal of Hellenic Studies. 57: 224–6. doi:10.2307/627146. JSTOR 627146. S2CID 163015293.
- —; Frankena, R. (1952). Catalogue sommaire: des cylindres orientaux. Den Haag: Imprimerie d'État.
- — (1953). Het Nabije Oosten: antieke kunst. Bussum: C. A. J. van Dishoeck.
- — (1961). "Looking back at "Frisians, Franks and Saxons"". Bulletin van de Vereeniging Tot Bevordering der Kennis van de Antieke Beschaving te 's-Gravenhage. 36: 41–59.
- —; Peters, W. J. T.; van Es, W. A. (1967). Roman bronze statuettes from the Netherlands. Scripta archaeologica Groningana 1.2. Groningen: J. B. Wolters.
- — (1972). Romeinse Keizersmunten. Kampen: J. H. Kok.
- —; Peters, W. J. T.; Witteveen, Antoinette M. (1973). "The figural bronzes". Description of the Collections in the Rijksmuseum G.M. Kam at Nijmegen. 7. Nijmegen: Rijksmuseum G.M. Kam.
- —; van Es, W. A.; Lallemand, J. (1974). Muntwijzer voor de Romeinse tijd (2nd ed.). Bussum: De Haan.
