= Marie-Victoire Jaquotot =

French painter

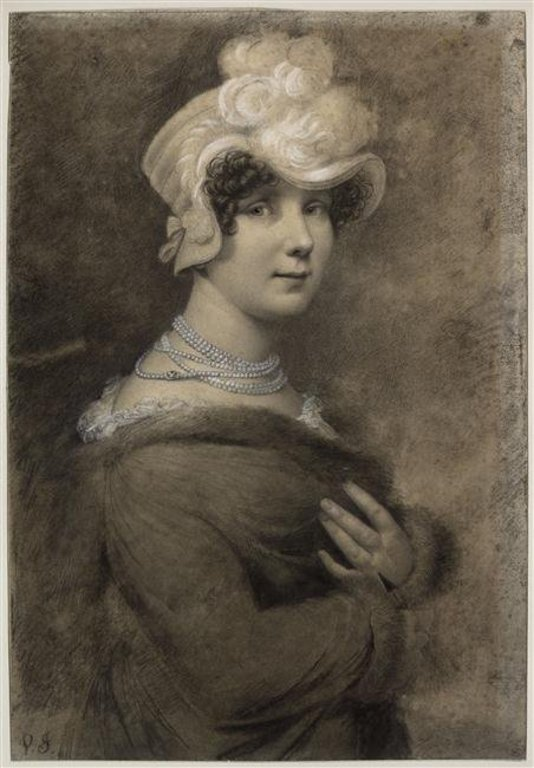
- Self-portrait
- Born: January 15, 1772; Paris
- Died: April 27, 1855 (aged 83); Toulouse
- Known for: Porcelain painting
- Spouse: Étienne-Charles Le Guay (m.1794 div.1801)

Marie-Victoire Jaquotot (maʁi vik.twaʁ ʒakɔto; 15 January 1772 – 27 April 1855) was a 19th-century French painter. In 1816, with the restoration of the Bourbon monarchy, Jaquotot earned the title “First Porcelain Painter to the King,” standing out among the many women artists who gained commissions, sales, titles and other forms of recognition from the new administration.

== Personal life ==
Jaquotot was born in Paris in 1772 to a bourgeois family. Little is known of her childhood.

On the 17 of June, 1794, Jaquotot married her painting instructor, Étienne-Charles Le Guay, an artisan working for Dihl & Guérard. They had no children, and through mutual agreement, divorced in june 1801^{:23}.

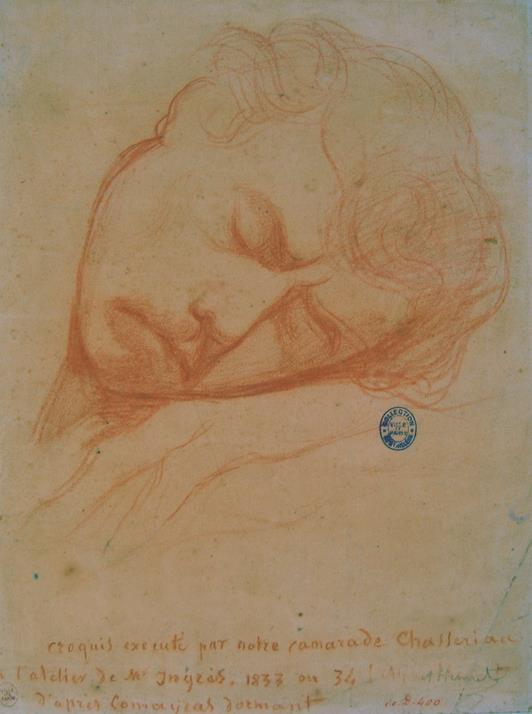
Comairas, Jaquotot's son, asleep in the studio of Ingres - drawing by Chassériau

Less than a year after her divorce with Le Guay, civil records note the birth of Jaquotot's child, Philippe Comarais, the product of a brief relationship with an architect from La Rochelle. No records or correspondence between them survives, and it is believed that Jaquotot purposefully destroyed evidence of her "coup de coeur"^{:24}. An amateur artist who would study in the studio of Ingres, Philippe was Jaquotot's sole heir, and bequeathed two of her porcelain plaques to the French state, now in the collection of the Louvre.

In 1830, Jaquotot began a relationship with Isidore Pinet, an acquaintance of one of her Parisian sub-tenants. The precise date of their marriage is unknown, but in 1840 Pinet persuaded her to relocate with him to Toulouse. He died there in the spring of 1848. Jaquotot remained in Toulouse until her death in 1855^{:20}.

== Porcelain painting ==
=== Dihl & Guérard (c.1790-1801) ===
The precise circumstances of Marie-Victoire Jaquotot’s professional beginnings are not known. Scholars generally assume that, during her period of training under (and later marriage to) Étienne-Charles Le Guay, a craftsman at Dihl & Guérard, she may have contributed to porcelain painting at the manufactory, although no documentary evidence directly confirms her involvement. Her divorce from Le Guay in 1801 effectively meant her departure from Dihl & Guérard^{:53}. She would immediately enter into the workshops of their commercial rivals, the Sèvres manufactory.

=== Sèvres (1801-1840) ===
Jaquotot's first major Sèvres commission was the "Service Olympique", a service consisting of 16 pieces, varying from vases, plates, and tea cups, all decorated with allegorical figures from Roman mythology. She began working on the service towards the end of the Consulate and finished it in its entirety in september 1806. It was selected to be part of a diplomatic gift from Napoleon to Tsar Alexander of Russia celebrating the signing of the Treaty of Tilsitt. Today, the Service Olympique is in the collection of the Kremlin Museum in Moscow^{:66}.

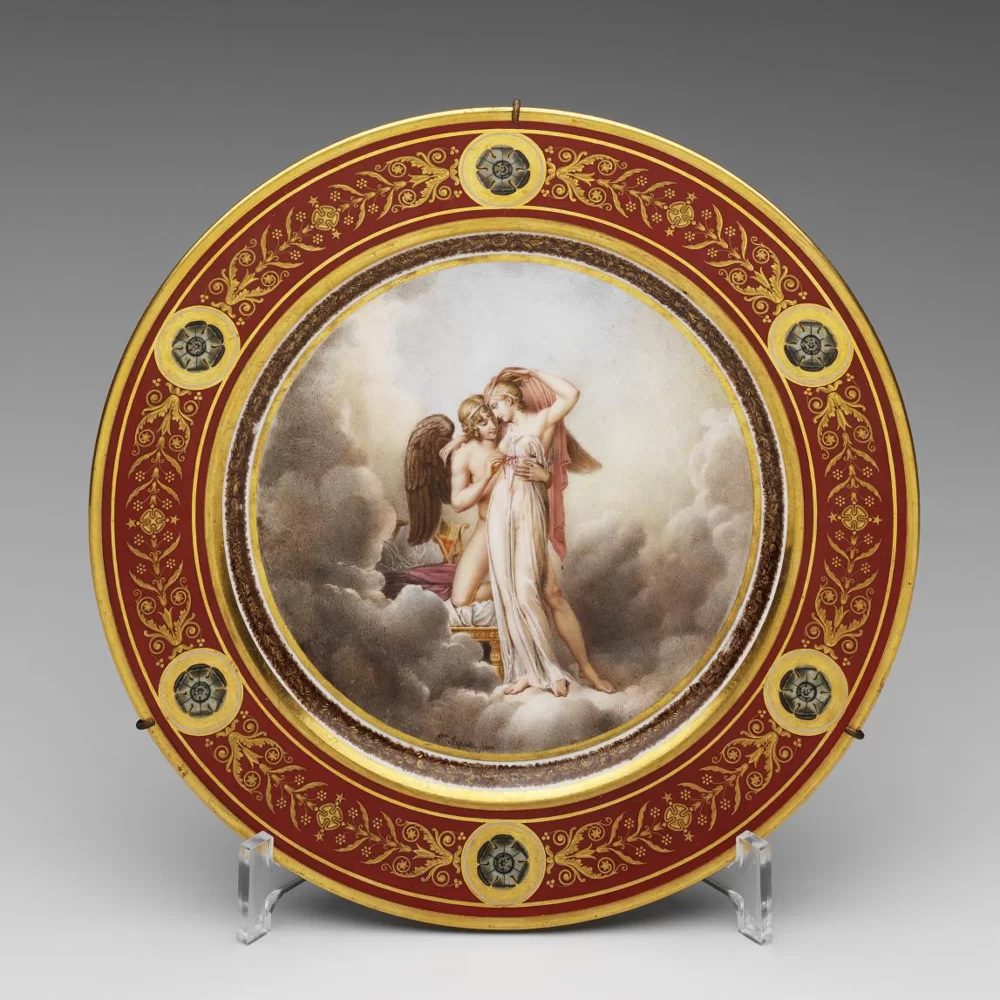
Cupid and Psyche - from the Service Olympique (finished 1805)

While Jaquotot typically received commissions through the manufactory and produced copies after master paintings, in April 1810 she was commissioned by Napoleon Bonaparte to create a portrait from life of Joséphine de Beauharnais, then the former Empress of the French. The work is now lost; however, Jaquotot’s records indicate that she was paid 8,000 francs for the commission, a substantial sum that reflects her elevated professional standing at the time^{:85}.

Jaquotot painted the "Cabaret des Femmes célèbres" between 1811 and 1812. Featuring sixteen prominent women from European history, including Catherine the Great and Empress Maria Theresa, and cultural luminaries such as Joan of Arc and Madame de Sévigné, the tea service was commissioned for Princess Pauline^{:89-90}.

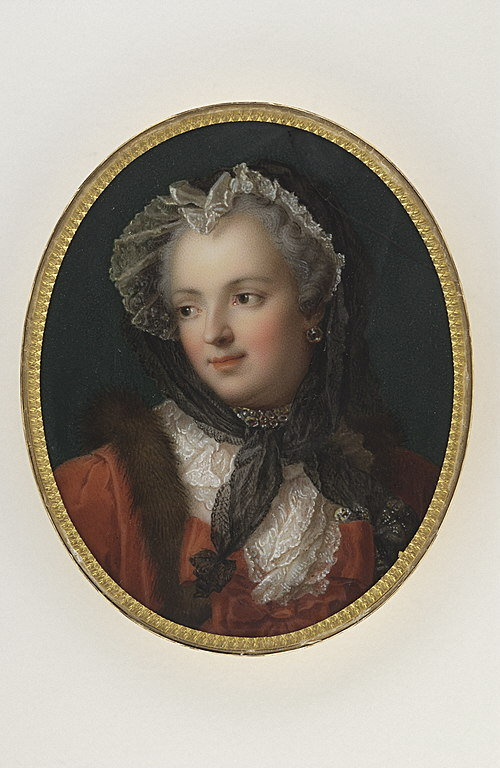
A snuff box cover for the Tabatière du Roi, depicting Maria Lecsinska (1703-1768), Queen of France. After J.M Nattier's portrait. Finished in 1820

With the instatement of the July Monarchy in 1814, the Imperial Sèvres manufactory became the Royal Sèvres manufactory once more, and received numerous commissions from Louis XVIII, notably snuff box covers featuring the portraits of famous aristocrats to make up the Tabatière du Roi, now in the collection of the Louvre.

==== Travels (1825-1840) ====
Then one of the few lauded female members of the Sèvres artisanat, Jaquotot often travelled out of France to draw inspiration from great European masterpieces and in some cases, copy them. Her first excursion, according to archival material, was in 1825 to Switzerland. She frequently corresponded with Alexandre Brongniart over the course of her travels, detailing what she had seen and what she intended to copy. She would also make a journey to Munich in 1832, writing:

"It took the irresistible allure of all the masterpieces in Munich to persuade me to prolong my absence, even at this moment when I must get back to Paris to finish my Raphael (her copy of La Belle Jardinière)"^{:29}

In 1835, Alexandre Brongniart wrote to the Count of Montalivet, the Minister of the Interior at the time, to recommend that Marie-Victoire should make a Sèvres mandated trip to Italy in order to make copies of the masterpieces there:

"You will judge, Monsieur le Comte, the importance of the difficulties of this art (porcelain painting), that one should only copy paintings of the first merit [...]. One should only allow artists possessing the talent of this art and the practice of colours at the highest degree, to paint such delicate copies."^{:29}

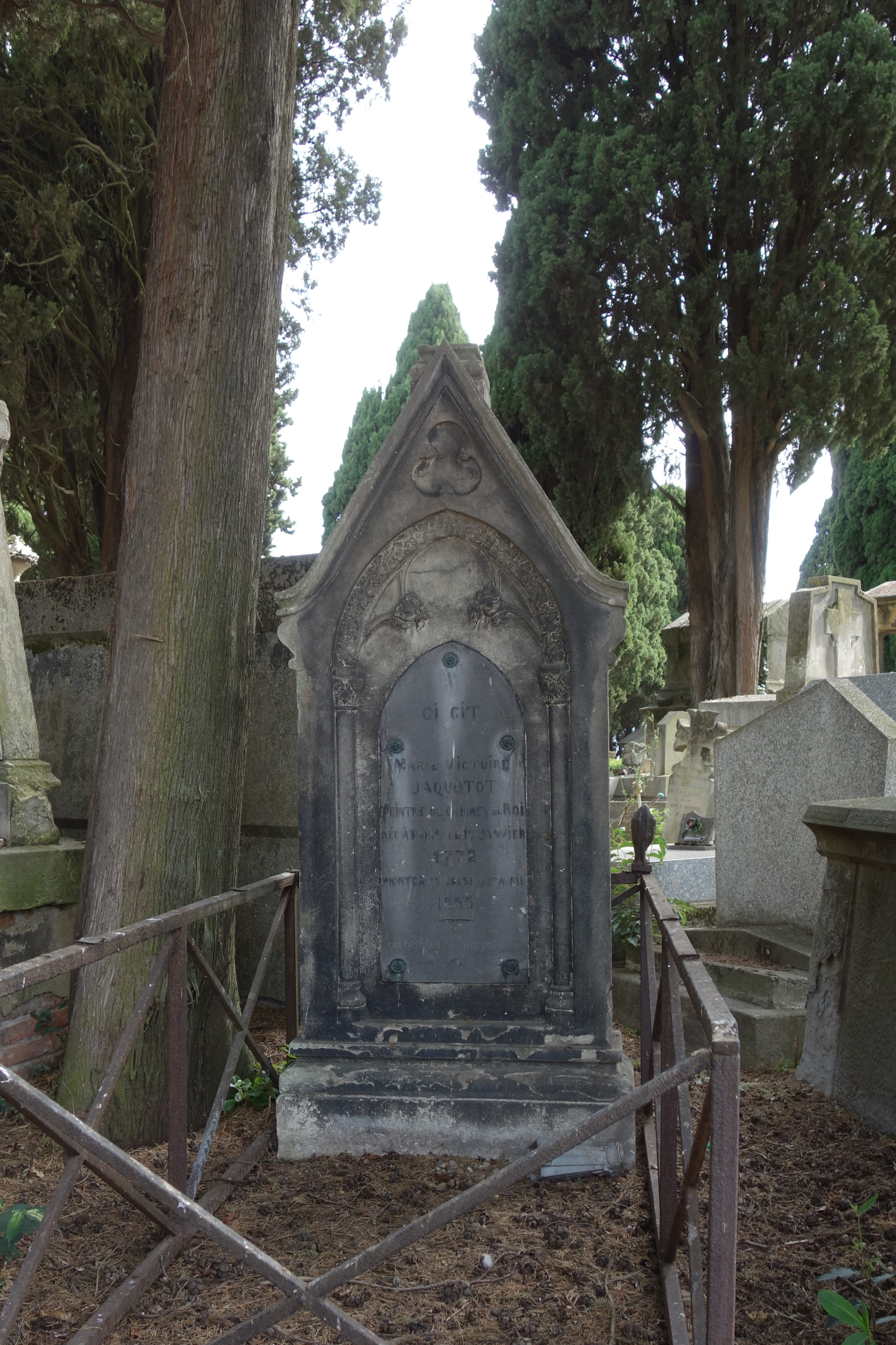
Marie-Victoire Jaquotot's final resting place, Cemetery of Terre-Camade in Toulouse

Between 1839-1840, Jaquotot made her mandated tour of Italy, notably the cities of Turin, Milan, Florence, and Parma, to see the masterpieces of Renaissance and Mannerist masters. She wrote some 44 letters (now lost) to Lucas Montigny, her local prefect, detailing her journeys^{:29}. Whilst in Bologna in 1837, Jaquotot produced a copy of Raphael's Saint Cecilia.^{:31}

In 1840, upon return from Italy, she would make a stop in Toulouse, where she would stay with Isidore Pinet, a friend which she would go on to marry in the same decade. He persuaded her to relocate there, and in doing so, end her affiliation with the Sèvres manufactory. She would remain in Toulouse until her death in 1855.

== Gallery ==
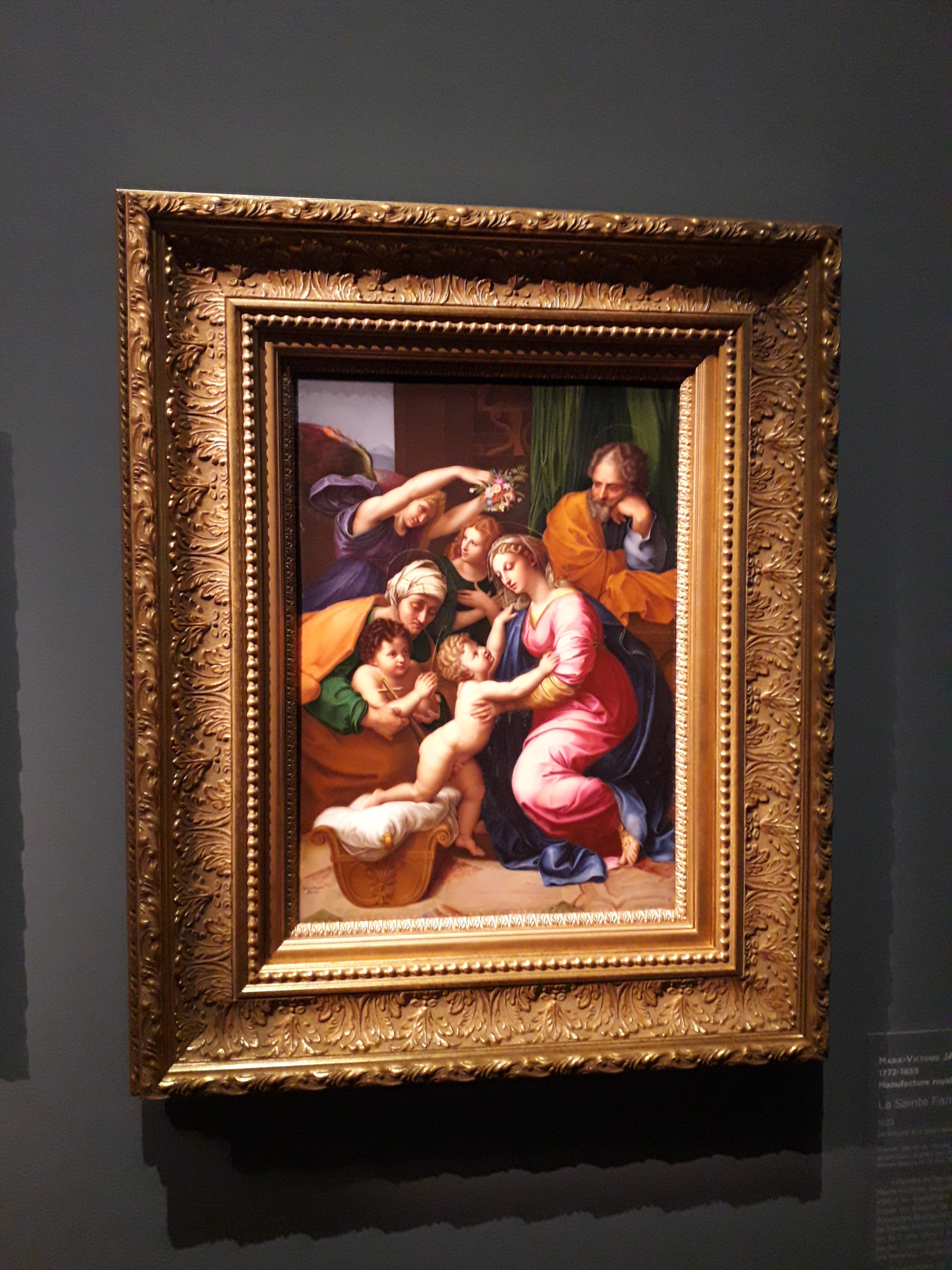
The Holy Family

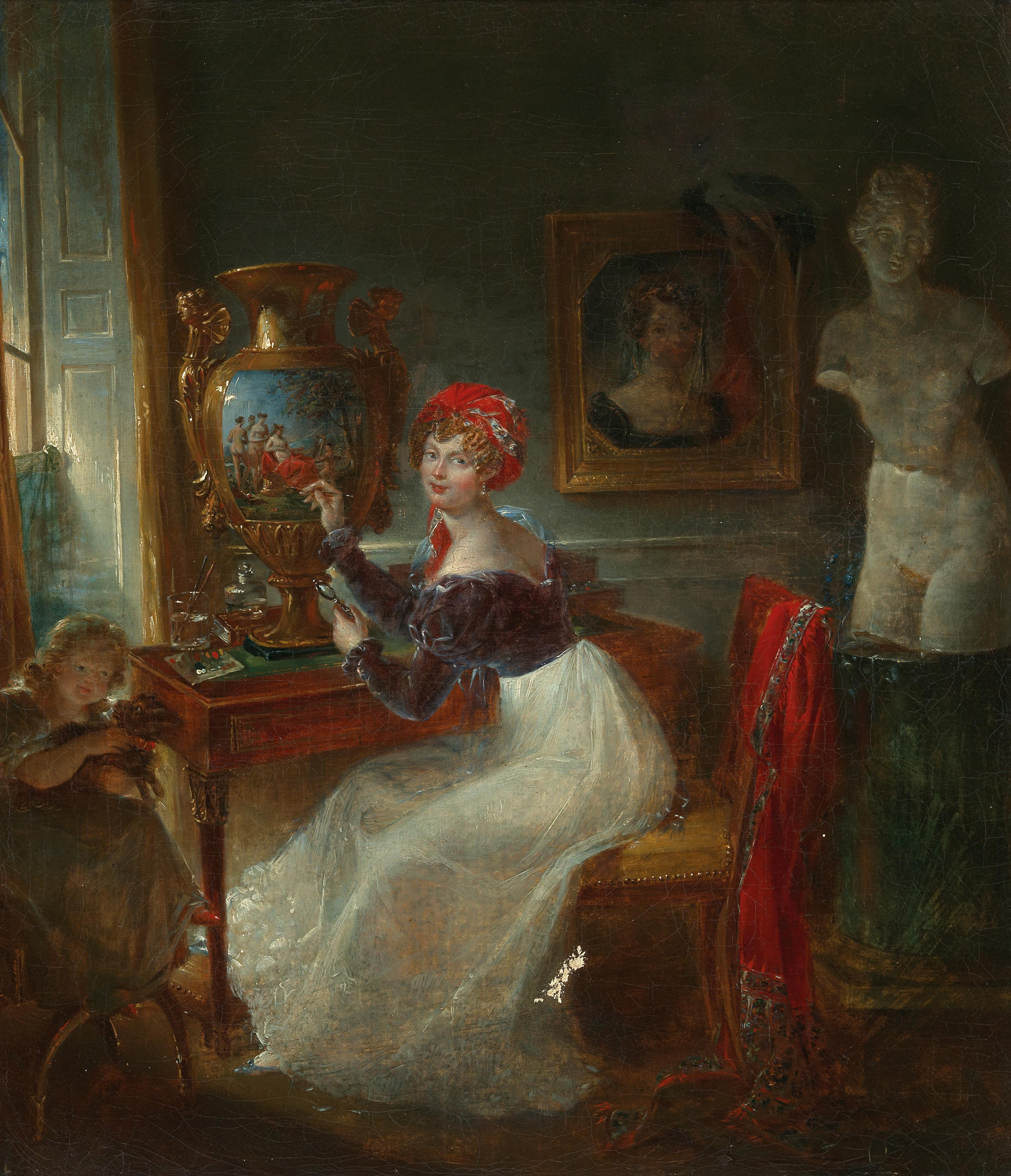
Self portrait in the studio

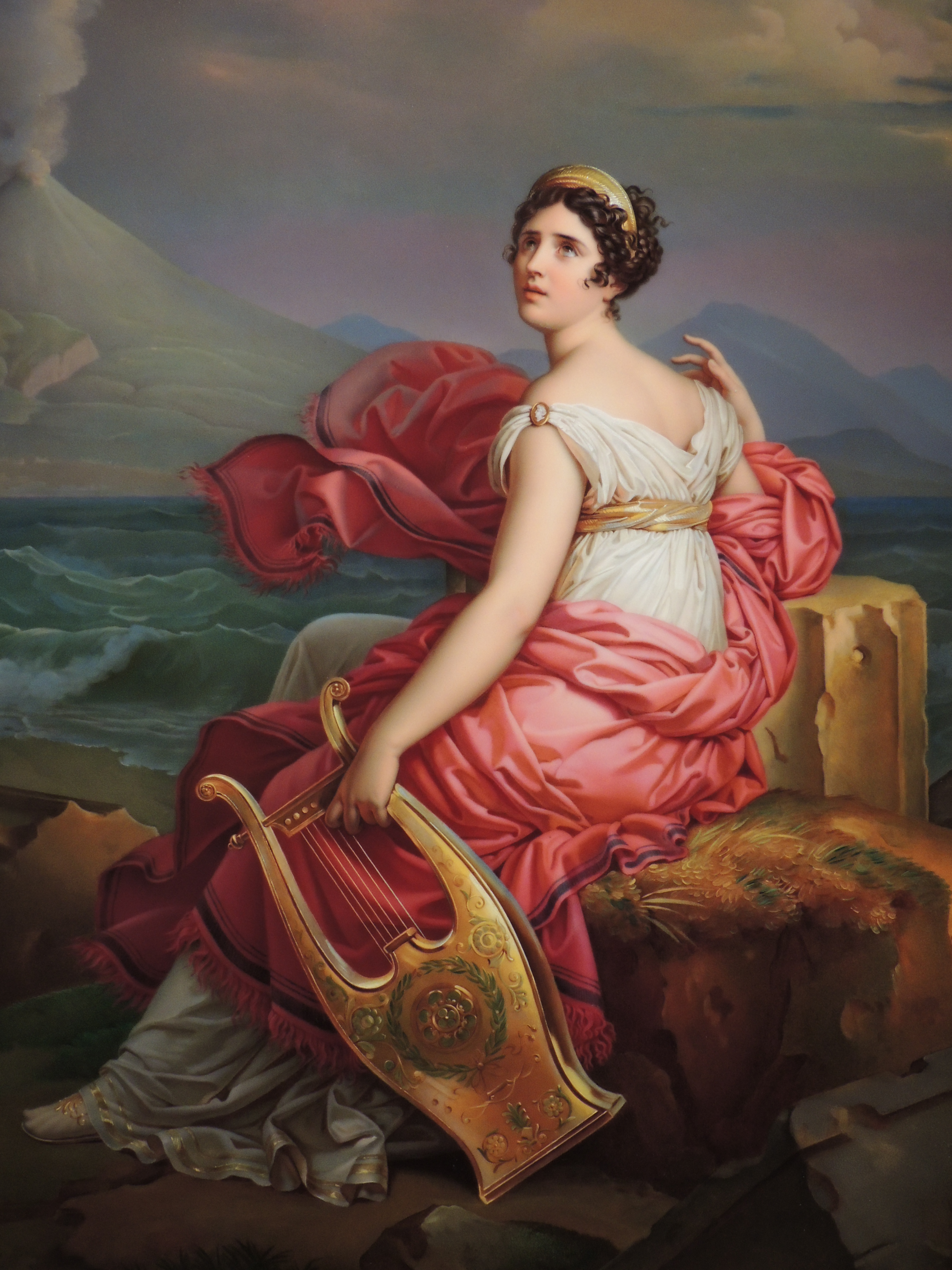
Corinne au Cap Misène

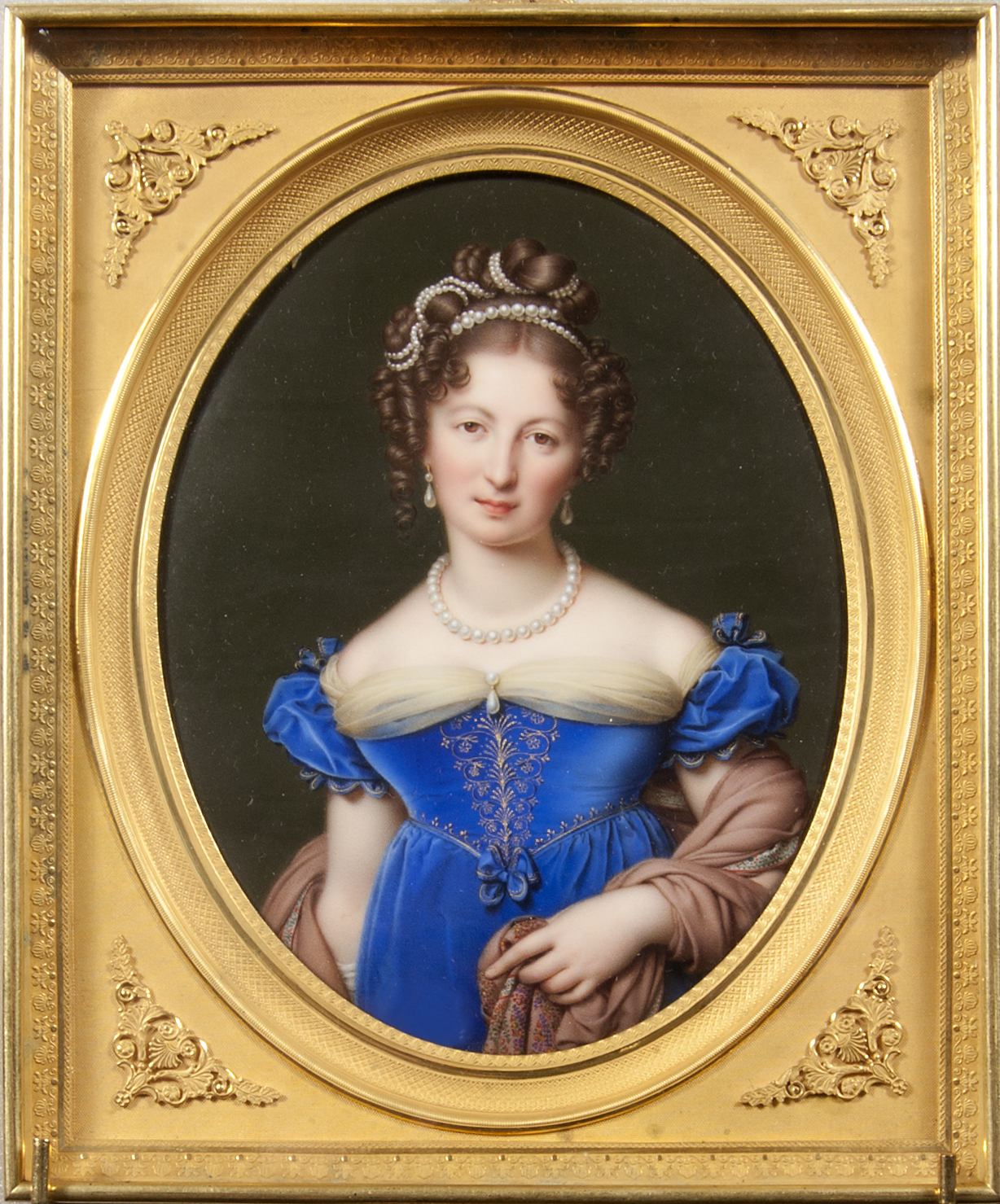
Elise Ksaverievna Branicka, Countess Vorontsova
