= Katharsis =

Katharsis may refer to:

- Catharsis or katharsis, a Greek word meaning "cleansing" or "purging"
- Katharsis (journal), an Israeli periodical
- Katharsis, one of the members of the fictional rogue team The Disgraced
- Katharsis (video game), a 1997 Polish action game

== Music ==
- Katharsis (band), a German black metal band
- Katharsis (Czesław Niemen album), 1976
- Katharsis (Praying Mantis album), 2022
- "Katharsis", a song by Doda from Diamond Bitch
- "Katharsis", a song by Tōru "TK" Kitajima
- Katarsis (band), Lithuanian alternative rock band

== See also ==
- Catharsis (disambiguation)
