= Catharsis (organization) =

Charitable organization based in Tbilisi, Georgia

- კათარზისი
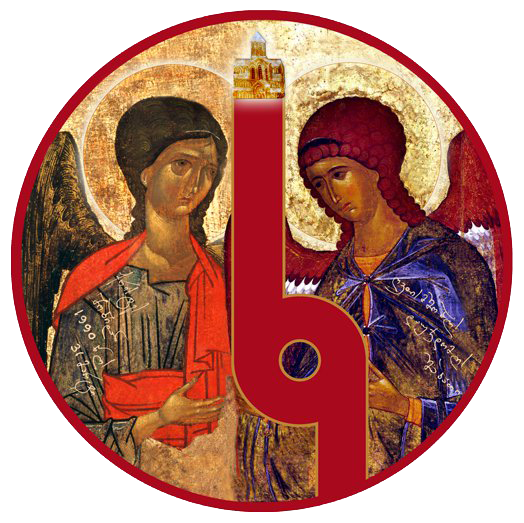
- Formation: March 31, 1990; 36 years ago
- Founder: Zaur (Oleg) Aladashvili
- Type: humanitarian association
- Legal status: Active
- Purpose: To help the homeless elderly
- Headquarters: 121 Agmashenebeli Avenue, Tbilisi, Georgia
- Fields: Clothing and consumer goods manufacture
- Official language: Georgian, English and Russian
- Website: www.catharsis.ge

Catharsis (Georgian: კათარზისი) is a charitable organization located in Tbilisi, Georgia.

== History ==
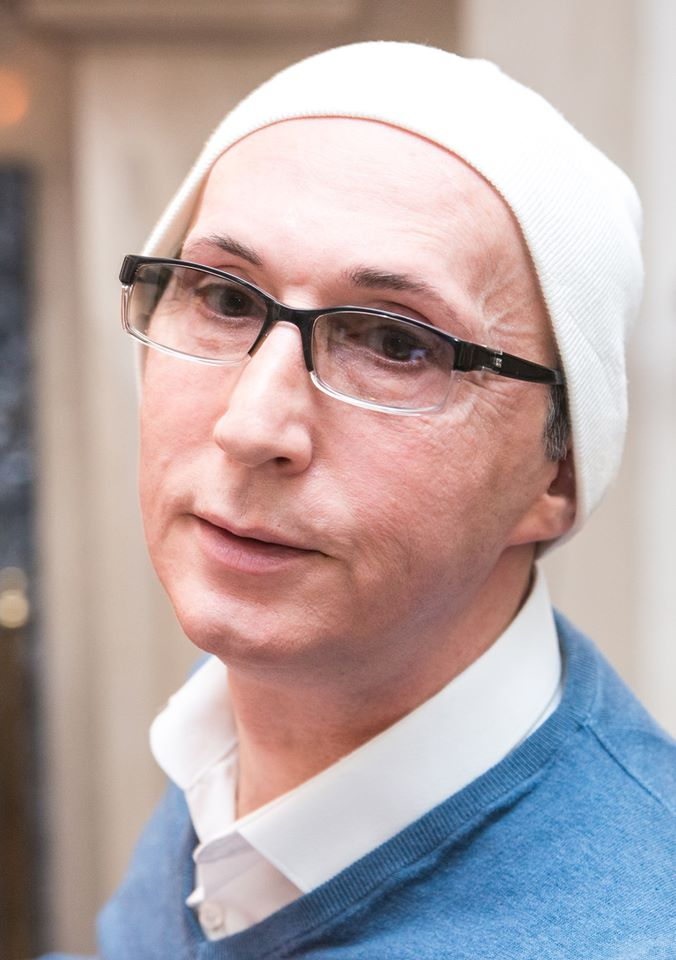
Zaur (Oleg) Aladashvili, founder of Catharsis

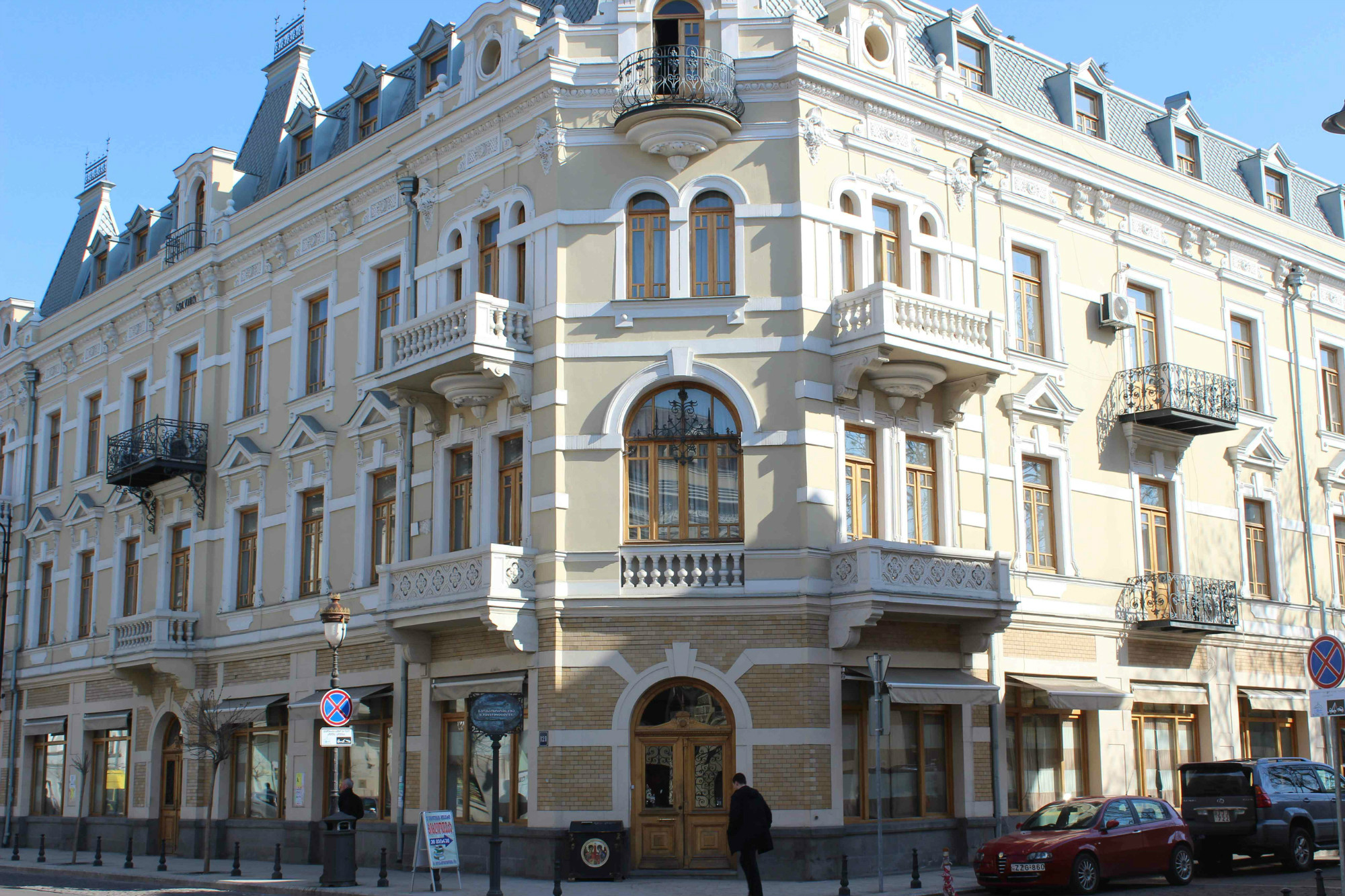
Catharsis in Tbilisi

Catharsis was founded in 1990. It is one of the oldest charities in Georgia and one of the first non-governmental organizations in the country.

The founder of Catharsis is Zaur (Oleg) Aladashvili. As of 2014, Zaur Aladashvili was director of Catharsis.

The organization has six branches operating in different parts of Georgia. The organization works as a "social support center for the socially deprived, homeless, and elderly".

Catharis operates the Nostalgia Senior Theatre, a theatre for seniors established in 1993. The organization provides food for the poor and hot meals for the homeless elderly.

== Services ==
- Canteen – serves about 310 people per day.
- Medical service – serves all people. The number of people who has a medical registration is more than a thousand.
- Rehabilitation – professional specialists advise and train seniors on suitable exercises and offer massage services.
- Room of relaxation – includes tropical birds.
- Café 'Juli'– Coffee shop for seniors for conversation, birthdays and dating. The café is named after Juli Sukhishvili – the group's former designer.
- Library – Classical or modern literature and periodicals.
- Second-hand clothes – Clothing is sold and a tailor serves old men without wives.
- Theatre of nostalgia – Amateur seniors put on shows. About 18 plays and comic sketches were staged there from 1993, including Cripple doll, The locked gate, Khanuma and Samanishvili's stepmother.
- Internet cafe – Seniors learn to use computers.
- Chapel – The chapel was painted by Georgian modern icon-painters: Merab Chakvetadze and David khidasheli. The chapel was blessed by Georgian Patriarch – Ilia II.
- Candlestick room – The group makes all candles for religious rituals there.
- Beauty salon
- Brothers of virtue – Soldiers who perform alternative military services.
- Volunteers – The group uses volunteers.
- Shelter – Some fourteen senior women can take refuge in the group's shelter.
- Cemetery – The organization manages a cemetery at Mukhatgverdi. It hosts a 7-meter-tall cross.

== Projects ==
- Dinner for everybody – offered since 2002. The event provides a meal for about 2000 people. About 97 such events have been held.
- Easter and Christmas assistance – Almost 181 socially unprotected families get help on Easter and Christmas.
- Grandmother and Grandfather of the year – Announced at the Christmas play-competition, which has been held since 2005. Seniors compete with each other in dances, songs, different arts. Artist-competitor winners get money, while every participant gets gift.
- Old men, let's plant saplings! – In 2005 seniors began a program of planting saplings in various areas. The first event added 150 lime-tree saplings to create a wind-protection zone in Didi Digomi.
- Temporary shelter – Catharsis provides tents, hygiene and meals for more than 200 homeless people. Almost 450 beneficiaries have received such aids since December 15, 2013.
