= Germaine Perrin de la Boullaye =

French archaeologist

- Born: September 2, 1875; Andelot-Blancheville
- Died: March 8, 1939 (aged 63); Marseille
- Spouses: Edmond Perrin; Gaston Venot

Academic work
- Discipline: Archaeology

Mathilde Marie Germaine Arbeltier Jullien de la Boullaye (2 September 1875 - 8 March 1939) was one of the first female French archaeologists.

== Biography ==
Perrin had a lifelong interest in archaeology and history, encouraged by her father Pierre Marie Christophe Ernest Arbeltier Jullien de la Boullaye, the curator of the museum of Troyes and a president of the Société académique de l'Aube. In 1907 she first undertook excavations on a Gallic cemetery at Soudé. She periodically employed Henri Rataux as a labourer to undertake excavations on her behalf between 1910 and 1914. The excavations uncovered burials from the Iron Age through to the Merovingian periods. Her archaeological collection was published in 1992 by Jean-Pierre Ravaux.

== Personal life ==
She married Edmond Perrin who was killed in World War I on 2 October 1915. She had four children: two boys including the future Dominican friar Joseph-Marie Perrin and two girls. She is the grandmother of Prof Alain Venot
