= Gentse Bijdragen tot de Interieurgeschiedenis =

Academic journal

Gentse Bijdragen tot de Interieurgeschiedenis (Dutch for Ghent Contributions to the History of Interiors) is a Belgian academic journal, the successor of Gentse Bijdragen tot de Kunstgeschiedenis en Oudheidkunde. The journal publishes on the historical interior in all its aspects, religious and profane. The journal publishes the lectures held on the Yearly Conference Historical Interior of the Ghent University.
