= Medical Humanities (journal) =

Academic journal

- Discipline: General medical, Multidisciplinary humanities
- Language: English
- Edited by: Sabina Dosani

Publication details
- Publisher: BMJ Group
- Frequency: Biannually
- Impact factor: 1.3 (2025)

Standard abbreviations
- ISO 4: Med. Humanit.

Links
- Journal homepage

Medical Humanities is a quarterly peer-reviewed academic journal covering the field of medical humanities. The journal presents the international conversation around medicine and its engagement with the humanities and arts, social sciences, health policy, medical education, patient experience, and the public at large. Led by Brandy Schillace, the journal publishes scholarly and critical articles on a broad range of topics. These include history of medicine, cultures of medicine, disability studies, gender and the body, communities in crisis, bioethics and public health.

The journal is abstracted and indexed by Medline, the Arts and Humanities Citation Index, Scopus and Current Contents/Arts and Humanities. The journal was launched in 2000, with the first volume being numbered 26.
