= Ursula Rothe =

Australian archaeologist

Ursula Rothe PhD
- Occupation: Classicist

Academic background
- Education: University of Manchester

Ursula Rothe is an Australian archaeologist specialising in Roman dress.

== Career ==
Ursula Rothe gained her doctorate from the University of Manchester in 2007 and then worked at the University of Edinburgh, first as a teaching associate, then as a Leverhulme postdoctoral research fellow with a project titled 'Dress and identity in the Danube provinces: ideal vs reality'. After working at the Reiss-Engelhorn-Museen in Germany, in 2012 she moved to the Open University as the Baron Thyssen lecturer. Rothe has been a co-editor of the peer-reviewed journal Archaeological Textiles Review since 2014. She is a member of the Archaeology Committee of the Society for the Promotion of Roman Studies.

Rothe is also a contributor to The Conversation news outlet and has written articles comparing modern immigration policies to the ancient world.

Rothe has her own website 'Doctor Toga' which features information and advice regarding Roman dress, alongside information about her work and publications.

In September 2019 Rothe featured on the Scott Mills radio show as 'Dr. Toga', advising the hosts on how to wear a toga to a toga party.

== Selected publications ==
- Rothe, U. 2009. Dress and Cultural Identity in the Rhine-Moselle Region of the Roman Empire (BAR International Series S2038). Oxford, Archaeopress. ISBN 978-1-4073-0615-5
- Rothe, U. 2011. "Der Grabstein der Severina Nutrix aus Köln: eine neue Deutung", Germania 89, 191–214.
- Rothe, U. 2012. "The “Third Way”: Treveran women's dress and the “Gallic Ensemble”", American Journal of Archaeology 116(2), 235-252.
- Rothe, U. 2013. "Die norisch-pannonische Tracht: gab es sie wirklich?" in Grabherr, G. et al. (eds) Relations Abroad: Brooches and Other Elements of Dress, Innsbruck, 33-48.
- Rothe, U. 2013. "Dress in the middle Danube provinces: the garments, their origins and their distribution" in: Jahreshefte des Österreichischen Archäologischen Instituts 81, 137-231.
- Rothe, U. 2013. "Whose fashion? Men, women and Roman culture as reflected in dress in the cities of the Roman north-west", in Hemelrijk, Emily and Woolf, Greg (eds.) Women and the Roman City in the Latin West (Mnemosyne Supplements, History and Archaeology of Classical Antiquity). Brill. 243–268. ISBN 9789004255951
- Rothe, U. 2014. "Ethnicity in the Roman north-west", in McInerney, J. (ed.) A Companion to Ethnicity in the Ancient Mediterranean, Wiley-Blackwell.ISBN 9781444337341
- Rothe, U. 2017. "Ethnicity", in Harlow, M. (ed.) A Cultural History of Dress and Fashion 1: Antiquity, London, 119-34.
- Rothe, U. 2018. "Veiling in the northern Roman provinces", in Ivleva, T. et al. (eds.) Embracing the Provinces, Oxford, Oxbow Books, 93-100.
- Rothe, U. 2019. The Toga and Roman Identity. London: Bloomsbury Academic.
