= Carmen Castillo García =

Spanish Professor Emeritus of Classical Philology

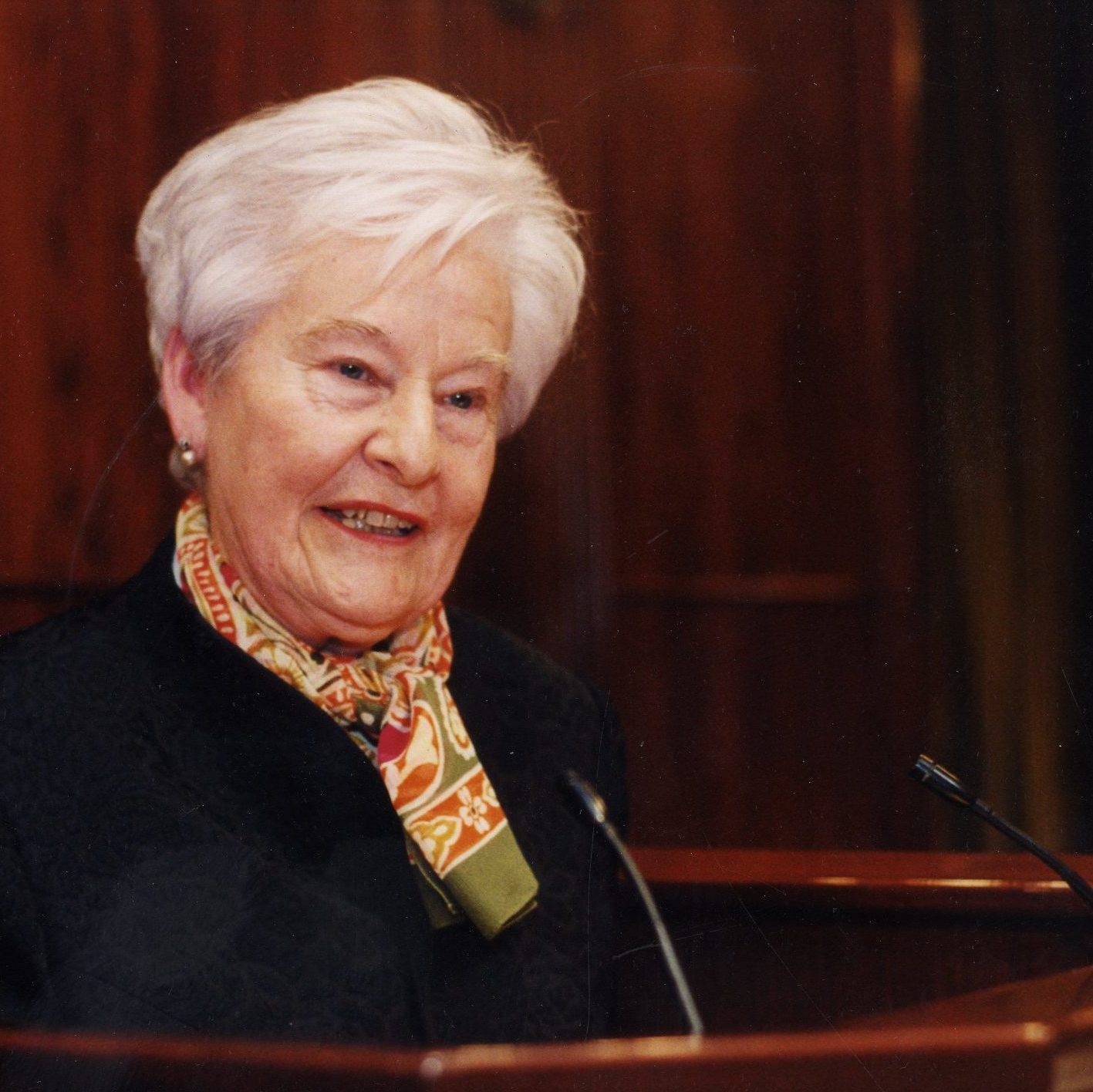
- Born: May 4, 1932 (age 93); Granada
- Education: University of Granada; University of Madrid
- Occupation: Professor of Classical philology
- Employer: University of Navarra

Carmen Castillo García (born May 4, 1932) is a Spanish Professor Emeritus of Classical Philology at the University of Navarra in Pamplona. She is the second woman to obtain a Latin Philology Chair in Spain. She is an expert on the Roman province of Baetica in southern Iberia.

== Life ==
García was born in Granada. Garcia began her studies at the University of Granada. Because she wanted to study Classical Philology she went on to study at the University of Madrid, where she obtained a bachelor's degree.

In 1962 she moved to Pamplona to join the philosophy and letters faculty at the University of Navarra where Dean Antonio Fontán appointed her as assistant professor. There she began her doctoral thesis, under the direction of Alvaro D'Ors. She studied, taught and also created a specialist library focused on the humanities. During those years, she replaced Professor Sanmartí.

In 1965 she defended her doctoral thesis at the University of Madrid. In the same year she published her book that deals with the collective biographies of the people of Southern Iberia at the time of the Roman empire. In December 1969 she became the associate professor of Latin linguistics, and in January 1970 she was appointed chair of Latin philology at the University of Madrid, as an associate professor. There she works with Francisco Rodríguez Adrados, Sebastián Mariner, Martín Ruiperez Sánchez and Antonio Ruiz Elvira. She was involved in the creation of the classical philology library headed by Martín Ruiperez.

In June 1972, she took the chair of Latin philology at the University of La Laguna. She was the second woman to obtain a Latin philology chair in Spain. The following year she returned to Pamplona, where she taught at the University of Navarra. She held the position of vice dean of the faculty of philosophy and letters (October 1973 - April 1982) and director of the department of classical philology (October 1973 - May 2002). In 1975 she published her book on the towns of settlements the Roman province of Baetica in southern Iberia.

In 1998 the University of Navarra published a book, Acto académico: homenaje a la profesora Carmen Castillo: Universidad de Navarra, Pamplona, 1998, in celebration of her career and work.

== Teaching ==
Professor Castillo participated in three summer courses organized by the Menendez Pelayo International University in Santander, directed by Manuel Fernández-Galiano; a summer course at El Escorial, organized by the Complutense University of Madrid, directed by Antonio Fontán. And finally, she attended a summer course, in Cartagena, organized by the University of Murcia, under the direction of Francisca Moya. She helped with the development of the Epigraphy course at the University of Bologna.

== Scientific interest ==
Her lines of research focus on two broad areas. On the one hand, Latin literature, with special attention to Classical Prose, (Cicero and Livio); the Comedy (Plautus); the translation and editing of texts. On the other, Roman History, in which Epigraphy and Prosopography stand out. In recent years her research has been oriented to the study of the fourth century, in both literary and historical fields.

== Works ==
- Prosopographia Baetica, 1968
- Städte und Personen der Baetica, 1975
