= The Islamic College =

Academic institution focusing on Islamic studies in London, England

Coordinates: 51.546°N 0.23056°W

- Motto in English: Higher Education in an Islamic Environment
- Established: 1998
- Location: London, England
- Website: http://www.islamic-college.ac.uk/

The Islamic College is a London-based academic institution specialising in Islamic Studies at both the graduate and the undergraduate levels. Until March 2023 its degree programmes were validated by Middlesex University.

In March 2023 the institution was accused of having links to Iran’s Al-Mustafa International University, which is currently under US counter-terrorism sanctions for allegedly recruiting students to Iran's unconventional warfare and military intelligence branch, the Quds Force.

It also publishes academic texts in Islamic studies as well as a quarterly academic journal.

In 2014 the Hawza Ilmiyya of England, an Islamic seminary, began to run at the same location.

== Publications ==
The Islamic College houses ICAS Press. ICAS Press has published a number of classical and modern Islamic texts and translations, particularly in the areas of Qur'an and hadith studies, theology, philosophy, mysticism, politics, and history. ICAS Press also produces the Journal of Shi'a Islamic Studies, a quarterly publication containing academic articles and book reviews of relevance to the study of Shi'ism.

== Programme ==
=== Undergraduate ===
There are currently two undergraduate programmes offered, BA Islamic Studies and BA Hawza Studies. The former aims to introduce students to the salient features of Islam as a system of belief and intellectual tradition from its inception until the modern era; covering essential subjects such as Islamic law, history, philosophy and the Arabic language. The second aims to provide a broader perspective on Islam as a civilisation and this is reflected in its course content. The latter focuses on religious studies, as would be found in a hawzah or traditional seminary.

=== Postgraduate ===
The Islamic College offers MA degrees in Islamic Studies, Islamic Law, and Islam and the West (formerly Comparative Philosophy) are validated by Middlesex University. These are offered both in-house and via distance education. The Islamic College also offers a DProf programme as a joint Programme with Middlesex University.

=== Certificate courses ===
In addition to degree programmes, the Islamic College also offers a number of certificate courses such as Qur'anic Arabic, Persian, Islamic Banking, Islam and Human rights and Islamic Philosophy.
