= Wim van Es =

Dutch archaeologist

Willem Albertus "Wim" van Es (born 1934) is a Dutch archaeologist. Between 1965 and 1988, he was director of the Rijksdienst voor het Oudheidkundig Bodemonderzoek.

== Life ==
Van Es was born in 1934 in Groningen. He studied classical archaeology and prehistory at the University of Groningen. From 1956 to 1965, he worked at the Biological-Archaeological Institute at the same university. From 1957 to 1958, he was also acting curator at the Drents Museum. From 1962 to 1965, he was curator at the Groninger Museum. He obtained his PhD at the University of Groningen in 1967 with a dissertation titled: "Wijster, a native village beyond the imperial frontier 150-425 AD." He was named part-time professor (Dutch: buitengewoon hoogleraar) of prehistory and protohistory of Northwestern Europe at the Vrije Universiteit Amsterdam in 1968.

Van Es became director of the Rijksdienst voor het Oudheidkundig Bodemonderzoek (ROB) in 1965 and remained in charge until 1988. When van Es took over as director from his predecessor Glazema he applied for more staff and financial funds to avoid having to throw away findings without even having done a proper analysis. He was successful in his applications and during his time as director the ROB grew from thirty to a hundred employees. Upon his departure as director the W.A. van Es prize for young archaeologists was established. Van Es remained working at the institute until 1997.

As an archaeologist, van Es was influential in the excavations of Dorestad. In the province of Drenthe, he was involved in Roman excavations in Gieten, Peize, Vries and Wijster. Van Es also performed excavations in grave fields and settlements in the province dating back to the Middle Ages. He published findings of Roman coins and statuettes in the three Northern provinces of Drenthe, Friesland, and Groningen.

Van Es was elected a member of the Royal Netherlands Academy of Arts and Sciences in 1978.
