= Studia Islamika =

- Discipline: Religious studies, Islamic studies
- Language: English, Arabic
- Edited by: Azyumardi Azra

Publication details
- History: 1994-present
- Publisher: Syarif Hidayatullah State Islamic University Jakarta (Indonesia)
- Frequency: Triannually
- Open access: Yes
- License: CC BY 3.0

Standard abbreviations
- ISO 4: Stud. Islam. (Jakarta)

Indexing
- ISSN: 0215-0492 (print); 2355-6145 (web)
- LCCN: 94944131
- OCLC no.: 73223366

Links
- Journal homepage; Online access; Online archive

Studia Islamika is a triannual peer-reviewed open access academic journal covering Islamic studies, especially concerning Indonesia and Southeast Asia in general. It was established in 1994 and is published by the Center for the Study of Islam and Society (Syarif Hidayatullah State Islamic University Jakarta). The editor-in-chief is Azyumardi Azra (Syarif Hidayatullah State Islamic University Jakarta). Articles are published in English or Arabic.

== Abstracting and indexing ==
The journal is abstracted and indexed in:

- ATLA Religion Database
- EBSCO databases
- Emerging Sources Citation Index
- Index Islamicus
- Scopus
