= Journal of Controversial Ideas =

Academic journal

- Discipline: Cross-disciplinary; Moral philosophy
- Language: English
- Edited by: Francesca Minerva; Jeff McMahan; Peter Singer

Publication details
- History: 2021–present
- Publisher: Foundation for Freedom of Thought and Discussion
- Frequency: Biannual
- Open access: Yes
- License: CC BY 4.0

Standard abbreviations
- ISO 4: J. Controv. Ideas

Indexing
- ISSN: 2694-5991
- OCLC no.: 1258737330

Links
- Journal homepage; Online archive

The Journal of Controversial Ideas is a cross-disciplinary, open access, peer-reviewed academic journal that allows academics to publish using pseudonyms if they request it. The first issue of the journal was published on 23 April 2021, and subsequent issues are published annually.

== History ==
The journal was established in November 2018 by academic moral philosophers Francesca Minerva, Jeff McMahan, and Peter Singer. It began accepting submissions in April 2020, looking for "careful, rigorous, unpolemical discussion of issues that are widely considered controversial, in the sense that certain views about them might be regarded by many people as morally, socially, or ideologically objectionable or offensive", and published its first issue in April 2021.

The idea for the journal started when Minerva received death threats and had difficulty finding employment as a result of a 2012 article she co-wrote on the ethics of child euthanasia in the Journal of Medical Ethics. Minerva then published a 2014 article in Bioethics titled Why Publishing Pseudonymously Can Protect Academic Freedom that led to discussions with McMahan and Singer that Minerva said gave the core concept: "We thought we should establish this journal where people can send papers they're afraid couldn't be published in other journals." According to McMahan, JCI "enables people whose ideas might get them in trouble either with the left or with the right or with their own university administration, to publish under a pseudonym".

Of the ten articles published in the first issue of JCI in 2021, three of the authors used pseudonyms.

== Reception ==
The Editors of Philosophy congratulated the journal for upholding the spirit of John Stuart Mill, but wondered whether the use of anonymity would hamper the quality of academic debate; they also noted the irony of leading academics from some of "the most prestigious universities in the liberal western world" launching what in another era would be known as a Samizdat. Tyler Cowen wrote that the journal would highlight the "very real pressures for excess conformity in academia", but could also "ghettoize" ideas. Russell Blackford welcomed the journal and said the first issue was "at a level comparable to most well-regarded journals dealing with ethics or public policy"; Blackford also noted that while it seeks to be cross-disciplinary, the first issue was very much a "philosophy journal". In The Conversation, researchers Haixin Dang and Joshua Habgood-Coote criticized the journal for enabling authors to "choose when to avoid controversy" with a pseudonym, stating that "researchers will be able to publish papers, claim them if they get a positive reaction, and disown them if they do not".

== See also ==
- Academic freedom
- List of humanities journals
