= Bijutsu-shi =

- Discipline: Art history
- Language: Japanese

Publication details
- History: 1950-present
- Publisher: The Japan Art History Society (Japan)
- Frequency: Biannual

Standard abbreviations
- ISO 4: Bijutsu-shi

Indexing
- ISSN: 0021-907X
- OCLC no.: 298183430

Links
- Journal homepage; [[[Category:All articles with dead external links]] ]

Bijutsu-shi (美術史) (lit. "Art History") is a biannual academic journal of art history, with a particular focus upon Japanese art. It is published in Japanese with summaries in English by The Japan Art History Society. The publication is also known as The Journal of the Japan Art History Society.

== See also ==
- Cultural Properties of Japan
