= Journal of Shi'a Islamic Studies =

- Discipline: Religious studies
- Language: English
- Edited by: Ahmad Jalali

Publication details
- History: 2008-present
- Publisher: ICAS Press on behalf of The Islamic College
- Frequency: Quarterly

Standard abbreviations
- ISO 4: J. Shi'a Islam. Stud.

Indexing
- ISSN: 1748-9423
- OCLC no.: 166346560

Links
- Journal homepage; Online archive

The Journal of Shi'a Islamic Studies is a quarterly peer-reviewed academic journal covering research on Shia Islam, including theology, philosophy, mysticism, law, jurisprudence, politics, history, Qur'an and Hadith studies, and current issues relevant to Shi'ism. It is published by ICAS Press on behalf of The Islamic College and was established in 2008. The journal also contains a book reviews section to review new and old works pertaining to Shi'a Islam.

== Abstracting and indexing ==
The journal is abstracted and indexed in:

- Arts and Humanities Citation Index
- ATLA Religion Database
- Current Contents/Arts & Humanities
- Index Islamicus
- EBSCO databases
- MLA International Bibliography
- Religious and Theological Abstracts
- Philosopher's Index
- Scopus
