= L'Information Grammaticale =

L'information grammaticale
- Discipline: Linguistics
- Language: French

Publication details
- History: 1979–present
- Publisher: Peeters Publishers (France)

Standard abbreviations
- ISO 4: Inf. Gramm.

Links
- Journal homepage

L'information grammaticale is an academic journal which publishes articles and book reviews on French linguistics.
