= Persica (journal) =

- Discipline: Iranian studies
- Language: English, French, or German

Publication details
- Publisher: Peeters Publishers
- Frequency: Annually

Standard abbreviations
- ISO 4: Persica

Indexing
- ISSN: 0079-0893 (print); 1783-1687 (web)

Links
- Journal homepage

Persica is an annual multidisciplinary peer-reviewed academic journal published by Peeters Publishers. It is the official journal of the Genootschap Nederland-Iran (Dutch-Iranian Society). The journal is abstracted and indexed in the Index Islamicus. Articles are published in English, French, or German.
