= Herbert Youtie =

American papyrologist

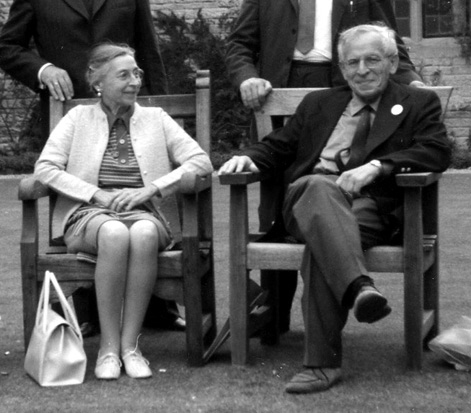
Papyrologists Herbert Chaim Youtie & Louise Canberg Youtie, 1972

Herbert Chaim Youtie (24 August 1904, Atlantic City - 13 February 1980, Ann Arbor) was an American papyrologist.

"Youtie raised papyrological research and publication to a new standard. At the time of his death he was internationally recognized as a leading interpreter of documentary papyri, the person to whom would-be editors of texts turned first when difficult problems arose, but also as a sage, who combined a mastery of Greek and a deep familiarity with daily life in Greco-Roman Egypt with a philosophical cast of mind and broad human understanding."

Youtie earned his Master's Degree from Columbia University in 1928, and later studied at Institut Catholique de Paris.

In 1934 he married his devoted companion and professional collaborator, Louise Canberg Youtie (1909-2004).

From 1929 until his death Youtie was at the University of Michigan. Originally retained as a research assistant in papyrology, Youtie maintained that position for seven years. From 1930-38 he was instructor in Greek, subsequently promoted to assistant professor in 1938 and associate professor in 1944. 19 years after his arrival, in 1948, he was named research professor of papyrology, a post he held until 1975.

Youtie won a Guggenheim Fellowship in 1957. That same year, he was elected to the American Philosophical Society. In 1959 he was elected to the Board of Directors of the American Philological Association.The British Academy made him a Corresponding Fellow in 1962; the Association Internationale des Papyrologues chose him Honorary President in 1968. In 1962 he was named Henry Russell lecturer. In 1974 he won the University of Michigan's Distinguished Faculty Achievement Award. He was also awarded an honorary doctoral degree from the University of Cologne, Germany, in 1969, an honor rarely accorded a non-German citizen.

During his career, Youtie published more than 110 works, and lectured at the Universities of London and Brussels, Oxford University and Harvard University.
