= Ecumenica =

- Discipline: Religious studies, performance studies
- Language: English
- Edited by: David Mason

Publication details
- Former name(s): Baylor Journal of Theatre and Performance
- History: 2003-present
- Frequency: Biannual

Standard abbreviations
- ISO 4: Ecumenica

Indexing
- ISSN: 1942-4558
- OCLC no.: 741251593

Links
- Journal homepage; Online access; Online archive

Ecumenica is a biannual peer-reviewed academic journal covering the intersection of religion and performance studies. It was established in 2003 as the Baylor Journal of Theatre and Performance and obtained its current name in 2008. The journal is abstracted and indexed in EBSCO databases, MLA International Bibliography, and the ATLA Religion Database.

In 2019, Ecumenica became a publication of Penn State University Press. All of Ecumenica's content, including the content of the Baylor Journal of Theatre and Performance, is now available through JSTOR.
