= Jean-Robert-Nicolas Lucas de Montigny =

Sculptor from France

Jean-Robert-Nicolas Lucas de Montigny (9 December 1747 – 29 January 1810) was a French sculptor. His son Jean-Marie-Nicolas Lucas de Montigny was a politician.

== Life ==
After training in his initial birthplace of Rouen, he entered the école des Beaux-Arts de Paris in 1774. He actively supported the French Revolution, sculpting busts of Voltaire, Jean-Jacques Rousseau, Mirabeau and Jean-Barthélémy Le Couteulx de Canteleu. In 1809 he married the daughter of the sculpture dealer Roland. He died in Paris.

== Works ==
=== Louvre ===
- Préville the actor as Figaro, bust
- Saint-Huberty as Dido, statuette
- Mirabeau, bust

=== Other ===
- Voltaire standing and reading, statuette, Institut et musée Voltaire in Geneva, acquired in 1957 by the Pictet family and donated to the city of Geneva
- Jean-Jacques Rousseau, collection of the Royal Museums of Fine Arts of Belgium, Brussels
