= Hozon Kagaku =

- Discipline: Conservation science
- Language: Japanese

Publication details
- History: 1964–present
- Publisher: Tokyo Research Institute for Cultural Properties (Japan)
- Frequency: Annually
- Open access: Yes

Standard abbreviations
- ISO 4: Hozon Kagaku

Indexing
- ISSN: 0287-0606

Links
- Journal homepage

Hozon Kagaku (保存科学) (lit. 'Conservation Science') is an annual open-access academic journal of conservation science particularly as applied to the Cultural Properties of Japan. It is published in Japanese with summaries in English by the Tokyo Research Institute for Cultural Properties.

== See also ==
- Conservation Techniques for Cultural Properties
