= Elizabeth Visser =

Dutch historian

Cornelia Elizabeth Visser s'Jacob
- Born: Cornelia Elizabeth Visser; 26 May 1908; Amsterdam
- Died: 3 August 1987 (aged 79); Haren, Groningen
- Education: University of Amsterdam
- Occupation: Historian
- Known for: First female history professor in the Netherlands
- Spouse: Eduard Herman s'Jacob

Cornelia Elizabeth Visser (26 May 1908, Amsterdam – 3 August 1987, Haren, Groningen) was a Dutch classical historian and university lecturer at the University of Groningen. In 1947 she became the first female professor of ancient history in the Netherlands.

== Life and work ==
Elisabeth Visser was the second of three children to carpenter Cornelis Visser (1876-1964) and teacher Clara Ernestine Dirksen (1882-1954) from The Hague.

=== Education ===
Visser's mother thought it was important that her daughters receive the same good education as her only son, so Elizabeth began her education at the Höhere Bürgerschule. Two years later, after receiving private instruction in Latin and Greek, she transferred to Amsterdam Lyceum for her third year. She graduated from there and began studying classics with historian David Cohen at the University of Amsterdam in 1926, and she also attended lectures in Egyptology at the University of Leiden. In 1932 she studied papyrology with Wilhelm Schubart in Berlin with the help of a grant from the Philological Study Fund. She spent a few months in Italy and from there embarked on a journey to Egypt. In 1938 she received her doctorate cum laude with a thesis titled Gods and Cults in Ptolemaic Alexandria.

=== Work ===
In 1946 Visser was named an assistant to David Cohen, at the University of Amsterdam, before he was deported to the Theresienstadt concentration camp by Nazi occupiers. Cohen survived the war there and Vissar referred to him as her spiritual father in the preface of her doctoral dissertation. In 1947 she was already employed as a lecturer in the cultural history of Hellenism. At the end of the same year, she was appointed to the University of Groningen with a teaching position in ancient history and Greek and Roman studies, where she worked until her retirement, as the first female professor of ancient history in the Netherlands.

About her 1947 appointment, she said,

It would be unnatural to remain silent about a fact, which for everyone who heard of my appointment, was in any case a curious peculiarity, the fact that I am a woman. My appointment proves once more, if need be, that the battle for the right of women to academic education and scientific work, and their ability to do so, has been won.

In 1964 she also became the first woman to hold the position of deputy rector at the University of Groningen. Her style was described as characterized by a traditional, social-liberal sense of responsibility coupled with modern or conflict-avoiding leadership qualities, leading to her nickname Mater et Regina (queen and mother).

In some publications, Visser also devoted herself to women and gender relations, such as in her lecture The Woman and Destiny in Greek Literature, in which she concluded that "whoever begins to sketch the picture of a woman in a certain period of literature ends up sketching the picture of the man in that period." She was connected to social and cultural life, so she became a member of the Classical Institute, the board of the Groninger Orchestra Association, the Soroptimists and chaired the Association of Women with Higher Education from 1953 to 1958.

=== Personal life ===
Visser married in 1974, two years before she retired. She married a colleague from the University of Groningen, a constitutional lawyer and university lecturer Eduard Herman s'Jacob (1905-1987). She died in Haren in 1987.

== Selected works ==
- Gods and Cults in Ptolemaic Alexandria (Amsterdam, 1938)
- Hellenism (The Hague, 1946)
- Polis and the city (Amsterdam, 1947)
- Syracuse resists Athens. Thucydides Histories, book VI and VII (Haarlem, 1962)
- Universitas Groningana MCMXIV-MCMLXIV (Editorial, Groningen, 1964–1966)
- Stathmen and parasangs (Groningen, 1964)
- The image of women in literature (The Hague, 1967 and 1979)
- Couperus, Greeks and Barbarians (Amsterdam, 1969)
- Das Bild der Kleopatra in der griechischen und lateinischen Literatur (The Image of Cleopatra in Greek and Latin Literature). Berlin, Akademie Verlag, 1966. 208 S. Pr. MDN 28.60." Mnemosyne 23.4 (1970): 453-454.
- Historiography in Hellas (Groningen, 1974)
- Democracy in Hellas (Groningen, 1975)
- Alexander’s Last Days in Hellenistic and Roman Tradition. Alexander the Great in the Middle Ages: Ten Studies on the Last Days of Alexander in Literary and Historical Writing (1978): 1-20.
