= Louise Youtie =

American papyrologist

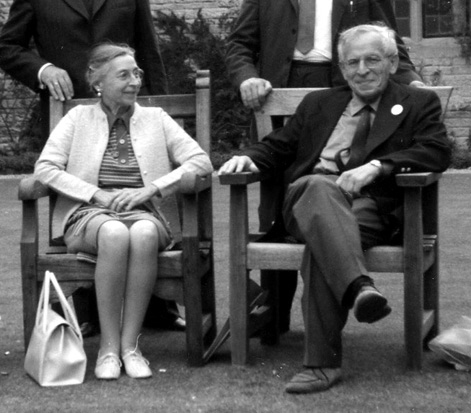
Papyrologists Herbert Chaim Youtie & Louise Canberg Youtie, 1972

Louise Canberg Youtie (1909 – 18 February 2004) was an American papyrologist. Louise was born on August 30, 1909, in Grand Rapids, Michigan, the eldest of the three daughters of Oscar and Mabel Canberg. She was educated at the University of Michigan, finishing her bachelor's degree in the Department of Greek in 1932 and her master's degree in 1933. Her husband Herbert Youtie was also a noted papyrologist. She published her research work in a series of articles in the journal Zeitschrift für Papyrologie und Epigraphik between 1986 and 1987. The articles have been compiled in a book form.
