= Katharsis (journal) =

- Discipline: Multidisciplinary humanities
- Language: Hebrew

Publication details
- Frequency: Biannually

Standard abbreviations
- ISO 4: Katharsis

Links
- Journal homepage

Katharsis, A Critical Review in the Humanities and Social Sciences, is a Hebrew periodical published twice a year and dedicated to detailed scholarly criticism of Hebrew publications in the Humanities and Social Studies.

It is published and distributed by Carmel Publishing House, Jerusalem. Katharsis was established in 2004 by Mezaref, a non-profit-making society registered in Israel. The first editors were John Glucker, Doron Mendels, and Moshe Shokeid.

Each issue opens – following the table of contents and editorial – by a 'programmatic' article criticizing some aspect of the manner in which study and research in the human disciplines are conducted in the Israeli academic world. Most of the main articles are 'review articles', dealing at length and in depth with books and articles in the Humanities and Social Studies published in Hebrew. The reviewers, experts in their respective fields, analyse in detail the book or article under review, citing exemplary passages for discussion, and deal with the methods (or lack of them) employed (or ignored) by the authors. The main aim of Katharsis is to raise academic standards by exposing errors, distortions and wilful deceptions in sub-standard publications; but some of the reviews praise works of serious scholarship and hold them up as examples to be followed.

Each issue ends with the section Remembrance of Former Generations, which includes a critical article or two by one of the leading Israeli scholars of the past century, preceded by a survey of his life and an assessment of his contributions to knowledge. Each issue also has a number of short, 1–2 page, 'pearls': quotations from books or articles pretending to present the reader with proper facts and explanations, while being full of basic errors. The editors explain what the errors are and what should have been written instead. At the back of each volume there is an English title-page, and English summaries of the main articles.

The present editors are Yehuda Friedlander, John Glucker, Alon Harel, Doron Mendels, and Amos Edelheit.
