= Studies in Iconography =

- Discipline: Art history
- Language: English
- Edited by: Richard K. Emmerson, Pamela A. Patton, Kathryn A. Smith

Publication details
- History: 1975-present
- Publisher: Princeton University with Western Michigan University
- Frequency: Annually

Standard abbreviations
- ISO 4: Stud. Iconogr.

Indexing
- ISSN: 0148-1029
- LCCN: 77642177
- JSTOR: 01481029
- OCLC no.: 960790738

Links
- Journal homepage; Journal page at Medieval Institute Publications; Past tables of contents

Studies in Iconography is an annual peer-reviewed academic journal co-published by Medieval Institute Publications (Western Michigan University) and Princeton University's Index of Medieval Art. Founded in 1975, the journal covers work on iconography and every aspect of visual culture of the period up to 1600.
