= Babesch =

- Discipline: Classical archaeology
- Language: English, French, German, and Italian
- Edited by: E. M. Moormann

Publication details
- History: 1926-present
- Publisher: Peeters (The Netherlands)
- Frequency: Annual

Standard abbreviations
- ISO 4: Babesch

Indexing
- ISSN: 0165-9367 (print); 1783-1369 (web)
- OCLC no.: 615561775

Links
- Journal homepage

Babesch, formerly Bulletin Antieke Beschaving is an annual scholarly journal published by Peeters. It was originally published, from its founding in 1926, by A.W. Byvanck. One of its main objectives is to provide a forum for archaeologists whose research and fieldwork focus on classical archaeology. Its aim is to present such studies as are likely to be of interest to any student in this subject. This established journal publishes original research papers, short notes of wider archaeological significance and book reviews. It publishes papers in English, French, German and Italian. lt has individual and institutional subscribers in over 30 countries.

The journal was previously published in Dutch, but since the early 1970s, it is a multilingual and international journal with an international editorial board directed by editors from the Netherlands and Belgium. Many of the journal’s editors also regularly contribute papers to Babesch. In addition, the journal awards an annual prize (named after its founder, Byvanck) to a junior academic who published his or her first paper with Babesch.
