= List of presidents of the American Philological Association =

This is a list of presidents of the American Philological Association, which in 2013 changed its name to the Society for Classical Studies.

== Presidents ==
| Term | Name | Notes |
|---|---|---|
| 1870 | William Dwight Whitney | |
| 1871 | Howard Crosby | |
| 1872 | William Watson Goodwin | |
| 1873 | Asahel C. Kendrick | |
| 1874 | Francis A. March | |
| 1875 | J. Hammond Trumbull | |
| 1876 | Albert Harkness | |
| 1877 | Samuel Stehman Haldeman | |
| 1878 | Basil Lanneau Gildersleeve | |
| 1879 | Jotham B. Sewall | |
| 1880 | Crawford H. Toy | |
| 1881 | Lewis R. Packard | |
| 1882 | Frederic D. Allen | |
| 1883 | Milton W. Humphreys | |
| 1884 | Martin Luther D'Ooge | |
| 1885 | William Watson Goodwin | |
| 1886 | Tracy Peck | |
| 1887 | Augustus C. Merriam | |
| 1888 | Isaac Hollister Hall | |
| 1889 | Thomas Day Seymour | |
| 1890 | Charles R. Lanman | |
| 1891 | Julius Sachs | |
| 1892 | Samuel Hart | |
| 1893 | William Gardner Hale | |
| 1894 | James M. Garnett | |
| 1895 | John Henry Wright | |
| 1895 | Francis A. March | |
| 1897 | Bernadotte Perrin | |
| 1898 | Minton Warren | |
| 1899 | Clement Lawrence Smith (de) | |
| 1900 | Abby Leach | |
| 1901 | Samuel Ball Platner | |
| 1902 | Andrew Fleming West | |
| 1903 | Charles Forster Smith | |
| 1904 | George Hempl | |
| 1905 | Herbert Weir Smyth | |
| 1906 | Elmer Truesdell Merrill | |
| 1907 | Francis W. Kelsey | |
| 1908 | Charles E. Bennett | |
| 1909 | Basil Lanneau Gildersleeve | |
| 1910 | Paul Shorey | |
| 1911 | John Carew Rolfe | |
| 1912 | Thomas Dwight Goodell | |
| 1913 | Harold North Fowler | |
| 1914 | Edward Capps (de) | |
| 1915 | Edward Parmelee Morris | |
| 1916 | Carl Darling Buck | |
| 1917 | Frank Gardner Moore | |
| 1918 | Frank Frost Abbott | |
| 1919 | John Adams Scott | |
| 1920 | Clifford Herschel Moore | |
| 1921 | Walton Brooks McDaniel (de) | |
| 1922 | Francis Greenleaf Allinson (de) | |
| 1923 | Edward Kennard Rand (de) | |
| 1924 | Samuel Eliot Bassett (de) | |
| 1925 | Gordon Jennings Laing | |
| 1926 | Henry Rushton Fairclough | |
| 1927 | Frank Cole Babbitt | |
| 1928 | Clarence Powers Bill | |
| 1929 | Tenney Frank | |
| 1930 | Charles Burton Gulick | |
| 1931 | Henry Washington Prescott | |
| 1932 | Ivan Mortimer Linforth | |
| 1933 | Campell Bonner | |
| 1934 | Elizabeth Hazelton Haight | |
| 1935 | Berthold Louis Ullman | |
| 1936 | George Lincoln Hendrickson (de) | |
| 1937 | Henry Arthur Sanders | |
| 1938 | William Abbott Oldfather | |
| 1939 | Austin Morris Harmon | |
| 1940 | Arthur Stanley Pease | |
| 1941 | George Miller Calhoun (de) | |
| 1942 | Lily Ross Taylor | |
| 1943 | Marbury Bladen Ogle | |
| 1944 | John Garrett Winter | |
| 1945 | George Depue Hadzsits | |
| 1946 | Levi Arnold Post (de) | |
| 1947 | Norman Wentworth DeWitt | |
| 1948 | Cornelia Catlin Coulter | |
| 1949 | William Hardy Alexander | |
| 1950 | Lucius Rogers Shero | |
| 1951 | William Chase Greene | |
| 1952 | Jakob Larsen | |
| 1953 | Benjamin Dean Meritt | |
| 1954 | Thomas Robert Shannon Broughton | |
| 1955 | Harry Caplan | |
| 1956 | George E. Duckworth | |
| 1957 | C. Bradford Welles | |
| 1958 | Gertrude Smith | |
| 1959 | Robert J. Getty | |
| 1960 | Louis A. MacKay | |
| 1951 | Robert S. Rogers | |
| 1962 | Inez Scott Ryberg | |
| 1963 | Howard Comfort | |
| 1964 | Gerald F. Else | |
| 1965 | Dorothy Mae Robathan | |
| 1966 | John Lewis Heller | |
| 1967 | Phillip H. De Lacy | |
| 1968 | Frederick M. Combellack | |
| 1969 | Herbert Bloch | |
| 1970 | Malcolm F. McGregor | |
| 1971 | Edward Togo Salmon | |
| 1972 | Agnes Kirsopp Lake Michels | |
| 1973 | William Hailey Willis | |
| 1974 | Harry Louis Levy | |
| 1975 | James Henry Oliver | |
| 1976 | Helen North | |
| 1977 | William S. Anderson | |
| 1978 | Frank O. Copley | |
| 1979 | George A. Kennedy | |
| 1980 | Bernard M. W. Knox | |
| 1981 | Michael H. Jameson | |
| 1982 | Michael C. J. Putnam | |
| 1983 | Zeph Stewart | |
| 1984 | Gordon M. Kirkwood | |
| 1985 | Helen H. Bacon | |
| 1986 | George P. Goold | |
| 1987 | Martin Ostwald | |
| 1988 | W. Robert Connor | |
| 1989 | Thomas G. Rosenmeyer | |
| 1990 | John Peradotto | |
| 1991 | Gregory Nagy | |
| 1992 | Erich Gruen | |
| 1993 | Ludwig Koenen (de) | |
| 1994 | Charles P. Segal (de) | |
| 1995 | Emily Townsend Vermeule | |
| 1996 | Robert A. Kaster | |
| 1997 | Susan Treggiari | |
| 1998 | Helene P. Foley | |
| 1999 | David Konstan | |
| 2000 | Julia Haig Gaisser | |
| 2001 | Kenneth J. Reckford | |
| 2002 | Michael Gagarin | |
| 2003 | James J. O'Donnell | |
| 2004 | Elaine Fantham | |
| 2005 | Eleanor Winsor Leach | |
| 2006 | Jenny Strauss Clay | |
| 2007 | Ruth Scodel | |
| 2008 | Kurt A. Raaflaub | |
| 2009 | Josiah Ober | |
| 2010 | Dee L. Clayman | |
| 2011 | Kathleen M. Coleman | |
| 2012 | Jeffrey Henderson | |
| 2013 | Denis Feeney | |
| 2014 | Kathryn Gutzwiller | |
| 2015 | John Marincola | |
| 2016 | Roger S. Bagnall | |
| 2017 | S. Georgia Nugent | |
| 2018 | Joseph Farrell | |
| 2019 | Mary T. Boatwright | |
| 2020 | Sheila Murnaghan | |
| 2021 | Shelley P. Haley | |
| 2022 | Matthew Santirocco | |
| 2023 | Matthew Roller | |
| 2024 | Alison Keith | |
| 2025 | Kirk Ormand | |
| 2026 | Ralph Rosen | |

== Bibliography ==
- Ward W. Briggs (1 January 1994). Biographical Dictionary of North American Classicists. Greenwood Publishing Group. ISBN 978-0-313-24560-2.
