= Grace Macurdy =

American classical philologist (1866-1946)

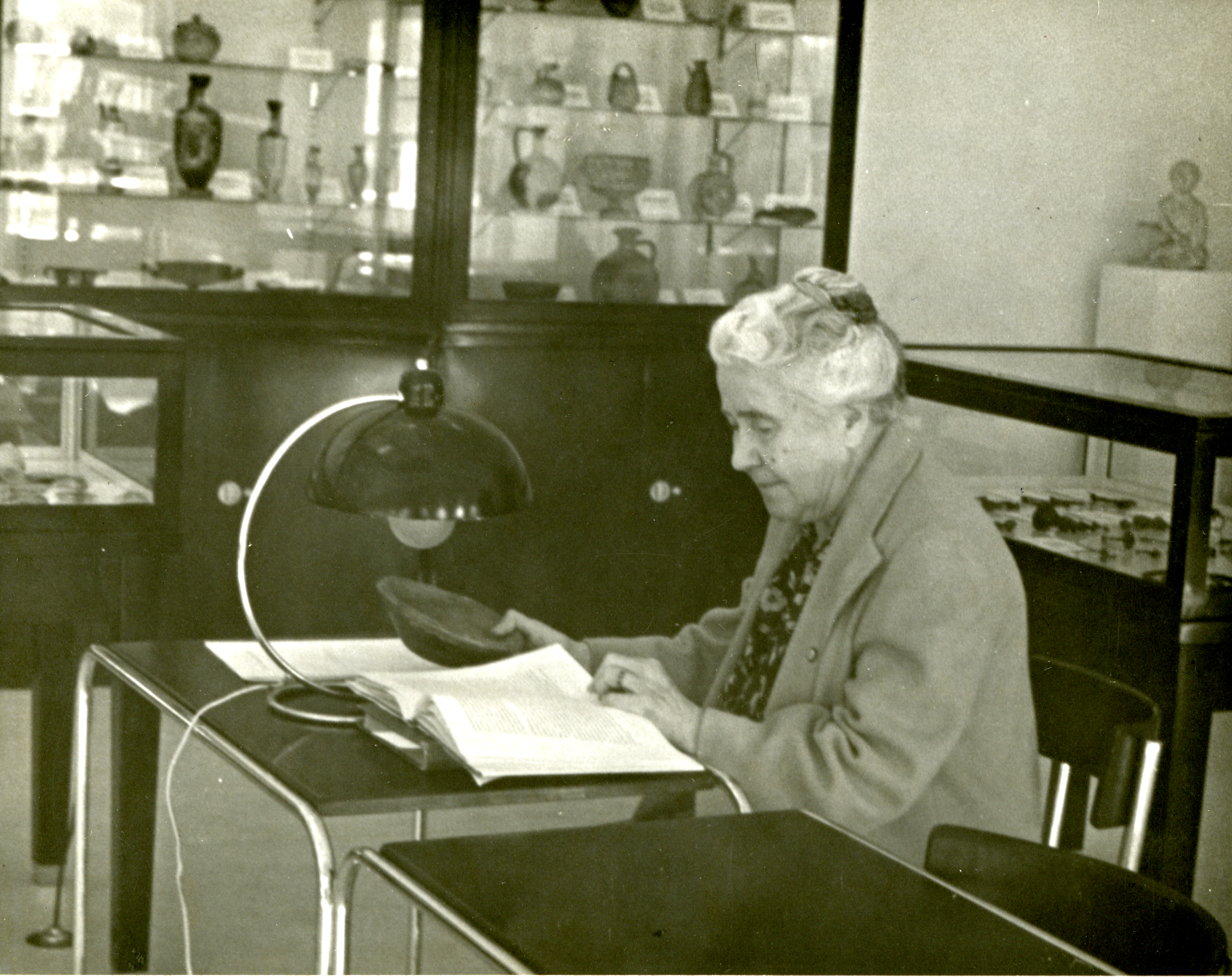
- Born: September 12, 1866; Robbinston, Maine, U.S.
- Died: October 23, 1946 (aged 80); Poughkeepsie, New York, U.S.

Academic background
- Education: Radcliffe College (BA); Columbia University (PhD)
- Thesis: The Chronology of the Extant Plays of Euripides (1903)

Academic work
- Discipline: Classics
- Sub-discipline: Greek History
- Institutions: Vassar College

Grace Harriet Macurdy (September 12, 1866 – October 23, 1946) was an American classicist, and the first American woman to gain a PhD from Columbia University. She taught at Vassar College for 44 years, despite a lengthy conflict with Abby Leach, her first employer.

Macurdy rose to become chair of the department of Greek before embarking upon an international career. One of her major areas of research was royal women during the Hellenistic period. Macurdy shaped the field of classics and the study of ancient history by pulling together both material evidence and textual evidence as sources in her pioneering studies of individual women.

== Academic career ==
Macurdy was born in Robbinston, Maine, and was the daughter of Simon Angus Macurdy and Rebecca Thomson Macurdy. She went to high school in Watertown, Massachusetts, before studying at Radcliffe College, where she gained highest second-year honors in 1887, and graduated in 1888. Macurdy would become the first graduate from Radcliffe to gain a doctorate, and become a college professor. At first she taught Greek and Latin at the Cambridge School for Girls, while continuing to teach graduate courses at Radcliffe, and in 1893 moved to Vassar College.

Macurdy was awarded a fellowship from the Woman's Education Association of Boston, which allowed her to study at the University of Berlin from 1899 to 1900, taking classes taught by Ulrich von Wilamowitz-Moellendorff. She gained her PhD from Columbia University in 1903, becoming the first American woman (and third woman) to have gained a PhD from Columbia. Her dissertation was titled The Chronology of the Extant Plays of Euripides, and was longer than most dissertations in the subject at that time. While studying, she had continued teaching at Vassar, commuting to and from Columbia, until the receipt of her PhD gained her a promotion, and she became an associate professor of Greek at Vassar. In 1908 she became the first woman to teach in the academic program at Columbia University, taking up undergraduate and graduate Greek courses in Columbia's summer session.

During her early career, Macurdy cultivated a relationship through letters with Gilbert Murray, who supported and encouraged her work, particularly after they met in 1907. It is clear that she originally patterned her work on Murray's, but as her research progressed she began to work on etymology of names, mythic and religious origins, and ethnology, thus beginning to model herself more after the approach of Jane Harrison, herself a female pioneer of the time. Her first book, Troy and Paeonia, was dedicated to Harrison, a dedication which Harrison received with great delight.

=== Conflict with Abby Leach ===
Macurdy's increased success brought her into conflict with the scholar who had first hired her to Vassar, Abby Leach. In 1907, Macurdy discovered that Leach was attempting to have her dismissed from Vassar. Leach began to seek a faculty member to replace Macurdy, and to restrict the courses which she would be allowed to teach. In January 1908, Leach formally proposed Macurdy's dismissal to the Vassar president, James Monroe Taylor, claiming that she needed a younger more "adaptable" colleague for her work. Leach also commented unfavourably on Macurdy's decision, previously encouraged by Leach herself, to study for her PhD while teaching at Vassar. Before Leach's proposal could be acted upon, she publicly reassigned Macurdy's class in freshman Greek to a new instructor, and she continued to write letters to Taylor criticising Macurdy. The trustees of the college rejected Leach's proposal, and unanimously reappointed Macurdy, instructing Leach to give her a reasonable share of the work in the department. Taylor continued to receive letters from Leach, and a letter from graduate students telling him of incidents when Leach had vehemently criticised Macurdy and her work to the students in their classes, including criticising details of her thesis.

Leach's campaign continued for several years. She continued to remove courses from Macurdy, and to persuade students against courses which Macurdy was teaching, then claiming that Macurdy should be dismissed as she did not have sufficient courses to teach, or sufficient students. Leach also continued her letter-writing, writing to alumnae asking them to criticize Macurdy, and writing further derogatory letters to the president of Columbia and professors of Greek who had taught her there. When Henry Noble MacCracken took office as the new President of Vassar in 1915, Leach immediately presented her case for the dismissal of Macurdy to him. However, MacCracken instead proposed the following year that Macurdy should be given a permanent post, and promoted to the rank of full professor, and the trustees agreed. Despite the lack of support, Leach continued her campaign until her death in 1918. Hundreds of the letters sent as part of the conflict are now in the Vassar Archives, stored under the heading "The Leach-Macurdy Conflict".

=== Head of department and later career ===
In 1920, two years after Leach's death, Macurdy became chair of the department of Greek at Vassar, a post which she held until she retired in 1937. In her new position, she increased collaboration with the Latin faculty, mentored younger colleagues, increased enrolments, improved the strength of the courses offered by the faculty, and continued to publish widely. She continued to be an effective teacher, lecturer, and international traveller, despite the fact that in 1919 she had begun to lose her hearing, a loss which then proceeded rapidly until she was almost entirely deaf by her mid-fifties. After the loss of her hearing, Macurdy took to using an ear-trumpet, a detail remembered fondly by her students in later anecdotes.

In contrast with Abby Leach, at whose hands she had suffered so much difficulty, Macurdy worked hard to promote the careers and scholarship of other younger female colleagues. She recognised the excellence of Lily Ross Taylor's scholarship, and helped foster her career even after she had left Vassar. She interceded with President MacCracken on behalf of Elizabeth Hazelton Haight's delayed promotion to full professor, and asked the president of Mount Holyoke College to take care that Cornelia Coulter not 'overburden' herself with teaching, thus making it difficult for her to publish successfully.

In the later part of her career, partly due to the reassurance of her status as an established scholar, Macurdy turned to the study of ancient women - a topic not previously explored by female classicists, and by few male scholars. In particular, she focused her work on ancient monarchies, and sought out the facts of royal women's roles, natures and characters, while attempting to cut through the prejudices and stereotypes about women which had made earlier treatments unsatisfactory.

Macurdy became the first woman to lecture publicly in Classics at King's College, Cambridge on May 25, 1925, after being invited by J. A. K. Thompson. As well as Macurdy being the first woman to participate in such a series, her lecture on "Great Macedonian Women" was an unusual topic for a university-sponsored, public lecture at the time.

Macurdy retired in 1937. In 1946 she was awarded the King's Medal for Service in the Cause of Freedom for her role in raising money for the British war relief during the Second World War. Her final book, The Quality of Mercy in Greek Literature was published in 1940, and examined the development of the 'humane virtues' in Greek thought. It is likely that her choice of topic was influenced by her horror at the events taking place in Europe in the late 1930s. Macurdy died in 1946.

== Impact and critical reception ==
Over the course of her career, Macurdy published significantly, including five books, fifty-seven articles in major academic journals, sixteen reviews, and several poems and articles in more popular volumes. Macurdy is recognised for being one of the few early women classicists who, rather than attempting to follow the paths laid out by male scholars and suppress her own gender, established her own approach to academic work. The study of women was central to her scholarship, and Macurdy was particularly interested in the importance of studying individual women with reference to their social circumstances, rather than allowing generalisation. She also recognised the need to use a wide range of material evidence in order to move past traditional scholarship, based primarily on the study of texts, and in her works therefore discussed coins, sculpture, vases, inscriptions and papyri.

Macurdy's work had a substantial impact on the study of women and ancient history. Her book Troy and Paeonia was described as "a work of first-rate importance", and her works Hellenistic Queens and Vassal Queens as work that showed her to be a "true pioneer" - "[anticipating] many of the features of the modern feminist approach to the study of women in antiquity."

On her retirement in 1937, the Vassar Alumnae Magazine published four 'Tributes' to Macurdy from other scholars, which recognised her fulsomely. Macurdy was described as a "true 'scholar' of a kind which is rare in America and by no means common in Europe" by Gilbert Murray, and by J. A. K. Thompson as "the first American woman to meet the Greek scholars of Europe and America on something like equal terms."

== Books ==
- The Chronology of the Extant Plays of Euripides (1903), (PhD dissertation). Lancaster, Pennsylvania.
- Troy and Paeonia, with Glimpses of Ancient Balkan History and Religion. (1925) New York: Columbia University Press.
- Hellenistic Queens: a Study of Woman-Power in Macedonia, Seleucid Syria, and Ptolemaic Egypt. (1932) Johns Hopkins University Studies in Archaeology, no. 14. Baltimore: The Johns Hopkins Press. (Reprinted in 1985 by Ares Publishers).
- Vassal-Queens and Some Contemporary Women in the Roman Empire. (1937) Johns Hopkins University Studies in Archaeology, no. 22. Baltimore: The Johns Hopkins Press.
- The Quality of Mercy: the Gentler Virtues in Greek Literature. (1940) New Haven: Yale University Press.
