= Henry Rushton Fairclough =

American classical philologist

H. R. Fairclough
- Born: Henry Rushton Fairclough; 15 July 1862; Barrie, Canada West
- Died: 12 February 1938 (aged 75)
- Occupation: Classical philologist

Henry Rushton Fairclough (1862–1938) was an American classical philologist of Canadian ancestry. He taught and did research at Stanford University from 1893 to 1927.

== Life ==
Henry Rushton Fairclough was born on 15 July 1862 in Barrie, Canada West (after 1867, Ontario). He was the son of James Fairclough and Elizabeth Erving Fairclough, attended the Collegiate Institute and studied classical philology at the University of Toronto. After obtaining his bachelor's degree, he became a fellow at the University College there, and taught Latin, Greek, and English at the high school in Brockville from 1884 to 1885. From 1885 to 1886 he completed graduate school and finished with a master's degree; he was subsequently appointed to be a teacher of Greek philology and classical history.

In 1893 Fairclough left Canada and became an associate professor of Greek and Latin at Stanford University in California, where he spent the rest of his entire career. He intensified his studies at Johns Hopkins University, where the classical philologists Basil Lanneau Gildersleeve and Minton Warren, as well as the Sanskrit researcher Maurice Bloomfield, greatly influenced him. In 1896 Fairclough earned his PhD. A year later, in 1897, he was named professor of classical literature at Stanford University, and professor of Latin in 1902. In 1903 he undertook his first educational journey to Europe, more particularly to Italy and Greece. Fairclough accepted an invitation to be Acting Director of the American School of Classical Studies in Rome during the years 1910 and 1911. During the First World War, he served in the American Red Cross in Switzerland and in Montenegro from 1918 to 1919, for which he was awarded many distinctions.

After his return to Stanford University, he was named professor of Classical Literature in 1922. In the same year, he was awarded an honorary doctorate by his alma mater. Fairclough was also a guest professor for Latin and Greek at Harvard University, and simultaneously president of the American Philological Association; as which he held an official speech titled "The Classics and our Twentieth-century Poets", which was printed in the following year. In 1927, Fairclough retired from Stanford University, but still taught as a guest professor at Amherst College until 1929. After his retirement from Stanford, the Classics program created the annual H. Rushton Fairclough Prize for excellence in scholarship in Classics.

Fairclough's research was focused on Roman poets. He wrote translations and bilingual editions of Plautus and Terence, the works of Virgil, and the satires and epistles of Horace. Further, he published text critical and exegetical individual studies of these authors and two monographs on the Roman and Greek concept of nature. Three years after his death, his biography was published posthumously under the title "Warming Both Hands", in which he describes his career and in particular his experiences during the First World War.

He died on 12 February 1938 in Palo Alto, California.

== Writings (selection) ==
- The Attitude of the Greek Tragedians toward Nature. Toronto 1897 (Dissertation)
- P. Terenti Afri Andria. Boston 1901
- with Augustus Taber Murray: The Antigone of Sophocles. San Francisco 1902
- with Seldon L. Brown: Vergil’s Aeneid I–VI. Boston/New York 1908
- with Leon J. Richardson: The Phormio of Terence. Boston 1909
- The Trinummus of Plautus. New York 1909
- Virgil. 2 Bände, New York/London 1916–1918 (Loeb Classical Library)
- Horace (1929). Satires, Epistles, and Ars Poetica'. Cambridge, MA and London: Harvard University Press and Heinemann – via Internet Archive.
- The Classics and Our Twentieth-century Poets. Palo Alto 1927
- Love of Nature among the Greeks and Romans. New York 1927
- Some Aspects of Horace. San Francisco 1935
- Warming Both Hands. The Autobiography of Henry Rushton Fairclough, Including his Experiences under the American Red Cross in Switzerland and Montenegro. Palo Alto/London 1941 (with Bild)

== Literature ==
- Ward W. Briggs: Fairclough, Henry Rushton. In: Derselbe (Hrsg.): Biographical Dictionary of North American Classicists. Westport, CT/London: Greenwood Press 1994, ISBN 978-0-313245-60-2, S. 170f.
