= Edward Kennard Rand =

American classical and medieval scholar (1871–1945)

E. K. Rand FBA
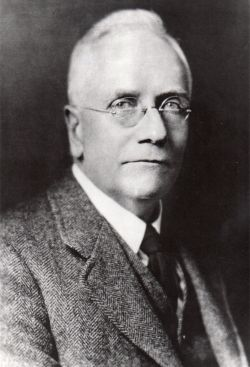
- Rand in 1920
- Born: December 20, 1871; Boston, Massachusetts, U.S.
- Died: October 28, 1945 (aged 73); Cambridge, Massachusetts, U.S.
- Spouse: Belle Brent Palmer (m. 1901)
- Awards: Legion of Honour; Order of the Crown of Italy

Academic background
- Education: Harvard University (BA, MA); University of Chicago; Ludwig-Maximilians-Universität München (PhD)
- Thesis: Der dem Boethius zugeschriebene Traktat de fide catholica (1901)
- Doctoral advisor: Ludwig Traube
- Influences: Santayana; Gregory; Wölfflin; Christ; Müller; Traube

Academic work
- Discipline: Medieval studies
- Institutions: Harvard University; Dumbarton Oaks; University of Chicago; University of California, Berkeley; Medieval Academy of America; Society for Classical Studies; Classical Association of New England
- Notable works: Founders of the Middle Ages (1928); The Building of Eternal Rome (1943)

Edward Kennard Rand FBA (December 20, 1871 – October 28, 1945), also known as EKR, was an American classicist and medievalist. He served as the Pope Professor of Latin at Harvard University from 1901 until 1942, during which period he was also the Sather Professor at the University of California, Berkeley, for two terms. Rand is best known for his 1928 work, Founders of the Middle Ages.

Rand founded the Mediaeval Academy of America, its journal Speculum, and served as the president of the American Philological Association (now the Society for Classical Studies) and the Classical Association of New England. At the end of his career, he was a senior fellow at Dumbarton Oaks.

== Early life and education ==
Born in South Boston on December 20, 1871, Rand was the only son of Edward Augustus Rand (1837–1903), a Congregational minister then Episcopalian priest, and his wife Mary Frances Abbott. They were an established New England family that otherwise consisted of four daughters. He was educated in Watertown, Massachusetts, and, being an overachiever, graduated first in his class among students who had no intention to attend college. Having been in a tight financial situation, he was encouraged by his friends to apply to Harvard and did so by ringing the doorbell of Charles William Eliot, then the president of the university, seeking financial aid. To the "bemused" president, Rand asked, "I would like to go to Harvard; do you have any money?" Upon hearing his request, Eliot personally saw to Rand's admission into Harvard College, where Rand would go on to graduate as class secretary with a B.A., summa cum laude, with further honors in the classics, philosophy, Greek, and Latin.

After graduating from Harvard in 1894 and earning his master's degree from the university a year later, Rand sought to follow his father's footsteps in becoming a theologian, enrolling at Harvard Divinity School, where he was taught by the philosopher George Santayana. Aimless, he spent three years tutoring fellow students and teaching at a summer school in Maine before finally being invited to join the Classics faculty as a resident scholar at the University of Chicago, where he was allowed to lecture on topics concerning the Middle Ages. During his second year at the university, Rand was given a leave of absence to study at the Episcopal Theological School in Cambridge, Massachusetts. Upon returning to the University of Chicago, he enrolled in a palaeography course taught by Caspar René Gregory, during which time he resolved to attain a Ph.D. at the Ludwig-Maximilians-Universität München and enter academia.

After traveling through Europe and arriving to study at the Ludwig-Maximilians-Universität München in 1898, it was there that Rand came under the influence of a number of prominent professors—most notably Ludwig Traube, the granduncle of Eduard Fraenkel—that shaped his postgraduate education. In November 1900, he completed his dissertation, Der dem Boethius zugeschriebene Traktat de fide catholica (The treatise ascribed to Boethius, De Fide Catholica), under Traube's supervision. In the spring of next year, he married Belle Brent Palmer—a native of Kentucky—and later returned to Harvard to assume a position as a Latin instructor.

== Academic career ==
Beginning with his position as a Latin instructor, Rand would become an active professor and academic until the end of his life. He often traveled abroad to assume momentary teaching positions, lecturing at various institutions such as the University of Toronto and the University of Paris.

From 1919 until 1920, Rand served two terms as the Sather Professor of Classical Literature at the University of California, Berkeley, delivering lectures on "The History of Classical Culture during the Middle Ages" and "The History of Pastoral Literature". He would, however, spend most of his years teaching at Harvard, where, from 1931 until 1942, he was its Pope Professor of Latin.

When Rand finally retired from teaching in 1942, he spent his last years as a senior fellow at Dumbarton Oaks. By his death, he had been an accomplished scholar who founded the Medieval Academy of America, the journal Speculum, Harvard's Servius, and was the president of both the American Philological Association and Classical Association of New England; he had been the author of numerous books and approximately 200 publications, of which more than 100 were articles.

=== Harvard ===
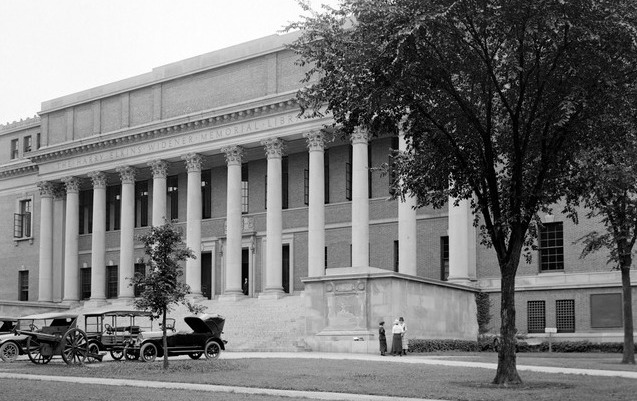
Rand's office was located in Harvard's Widener Library (seen pictured in 1920)

Following his arrival to Harvard in 1901 to teach Latin, Rand gradually rose to the position of assistant professor and, eventually, received a full professorship in 1909. Some of his early work consisted of examining the manuscripts of the philosopher Boethius, who had been the subject of his dissertation, and his Opuscula sacra. However, it was to the early Roman poets that Rand dedicated the majority of his early career. Committed to inflating the status of the poet Virgil, he used "a somewhat audacious mixture of travel and philology" to enhance the appeal of his article, In quest of Virgil's birthplace. Following this, a series of other articles Rand wrote on Virgil were later compiled into a lecture series he gave at Northwestern University, which in turn was used in his work, The Magical Art of Virgil, published in 1931. He also wrote booklets on Horace and Ovid, delivering addresses on them and other Roman writers to the Rice Institute (now Rice University) and the Sorbonne.

At Harvard, Rand spent much of his time writing reviews and articles in academic journals, later succeeding his colleague Clifford Herschel Moore as the Pope Professor in 1931. From his lectures at the Lowell Institute came his most significant work, The Founders of the Middle Ages, which had been first published in 1928.

Having delivered presidential and Phi Beta Kappa addresses at the university, he developed a reputation as a skilled orator and rhetorician.

== Awards ==
Rand had been a member of the American Philosophical Society, the National Institute of Arts and Letters, the American Academy in Rome, and the Dante Society; as well as a fellow of the British Academy, the Academy of Inscriptions, and the Bavarian Academy of Sciences and Humanities, among others. The Medieval Academy of America established the "Edward Kennard Rand Prize in Medieval Studies" in his honor, awarding a sum of 200 dollars as part of an essay competition in 1928, 1929, and 1930.

During his life, Rand received honorary degrees from multiple universities, including his alma mater, Harvard. The Victoria University of Manchester, Case Western Reserve University, and the Trinity College Dublin all granted him a Doctor of Letters (Litt.D.), and the University of Glasgow and the University of Pennsylvania awarded him the degree of Legum Doctor (LL.D.). Following his death, the University of Paris awarded him its first post-war honorary doctorate (rentrée solennelle) for his work as a scholar.

In 1939, Rand and his wife were made Chevaliers of the French Legion of Honour. Prior to this, he had also been awarded the Order of the Crown of Italy.

== Selected publications ==
=== Books ===
- Rand, Edward Kennard (1906). Johannes Scottus. Munich: C. H. Beck.
- Rand, Edward Kennard; Wilkins, Ernest Hatch; White, A. C. (1912). Dantis Alagherii Operum Latinorum Concordantiae; curante Societate Dantea quae est Cantabrigiae in Nova Anglia. Oxford University Press.
- The Theological Tractates. Translated by Rand, Edward Kennard; Steward, H. F. Harvard University Press. 1918.
- Rand, Edward Kennard (2013) [1957]. Founders of the Middle Ages. Harvard University Press. ISBN 978-0486203690.
- Rand, Edward Kennard (1929). Studies in the Script of Tours. I: A Survey of the Manuscripts of Tours. Vol. 1. Cambridge, MA: Medieval Academy of America.
- Rand, Edward Kennard (2014) [1930]. In Quest of Virgil's Birthplace. Cambridge, MA: Harvard University Press. ISBN 978-0674428034.
- Rand, Edward Kennard (1930). A Walk to Horace's Farm. Boston, MA: Houghton Mifflin.
- Rand, Edward Kennard (1931). The Magical Art of Virgil. Cambridge, MA: Harvard University Press.
- Rand, Edward Kennard (1934). Studies in the Script of Tours, II. The Earliest Book of Tours. Vol. 2. Cambridge, MA: Medieval Academy of America.
- Rand, Edward Kennard; Jones, L. W. (1934). The Earliest Book of Tours. Studies in the script of Tours. Cambridge, MA: Medieval Academy of America. LCCN 35000225. OCLC 1380956.
- Rand, Edward Kennard (1938). The Ancient Classics and the New Humanism. Oxford University Press.
- Rand, Edward Kennard (1943). The Building of Eternal Rome. Harvard University Press. ASIN B0006EUD3Y.

=== Journal articles ===
- Rand, Edward Kennard (October 1923). "A Romantic Biography of Virgil". Classical Philology. 18 (4). University of Chicago Press: 303–309. doi:10.1086/360529. JSTOR 262878.
- Les ésprits souverains: dans la littérature romaine (Paris, 1936)
- Rand, Edward Kennard (April 1937). "Horace and the Spirit of Comedy: A Course of Three Public Lectures Delivered on the Sharp Foundation of the Rice Institute". The Rice Institute Pamphlet. Rice Institute: 39–117.

=== Posthumous ===
- Rand, Edward Kennard (1946). Cicero in the Courtroom of St. Thomas Aquinas. Aquinas Lecture 1945. Milwaukee, WI: Marquette University Press.
- Servianorum in Vergilii carmina commentariorum editionis Harvardianae Volumen II, ed. with J. J. H. Savage et al. (Lancaster, PA, 1946).
- Festschrift: Classical and Mediaeval Studies in Honor of Edward Kennard Rand, ed. Leslie Webber Jones (Cambridge, 1938; repr. Freeport, NY, 1968).

== Sources ==
- "Harvard's Class Day". The New York Times. July 4, 1894. p. 2.
- Rand, Edward (1900). Der dem Boethius zugeschriebene Traktat de fide catholica. Jahrbuch – via Harvard Divinity School.
- "Rules Governing the Award of the Edward Kennard Rand Prize in Mediaeval Studies". Speculum. 2 (3): 234. July 1927. doi:10.1017/S0038713400032826. S2CID 225085879.
- "France's Legion Of Honor Given to Professor Rand". The Harvard Crimson. October 18, 1939.
- Jones, Leslie Webber, ed. (1940). "Classical and Mediaeval Studies in Honor of Edward Kennard Rand". The Classical Review. 54 (3). Cambridge University Press: 155–156.
- "Dr. E.K. Rand, 73, Classical Scholar". The New York Times. October 29, 1945. p. 19.
- "In Memoriam—Edward Kennard Rand—1871-1945". The Classical Review. 22 (5): 36–38. February 1946.
- "Edward Rand is Dead at 73". The Harvard Crimson. October 30, 1945.
- Peebles, Bernard M. (1946). "Edward Kennard Rand (1871—1945)". Scriptorium. 1 (1): 166–168.
- Beeson, Charles H.; Brown, John Nicholas; Ryan, James H. (July 1946). "Edward Kennard Rand". Speculum. 21 (3): 378–381.
- Rand, E. K. (1968) [1946]. Cicero in the Courtroom of St. Thomas Aquinas. Marquette University Press. ISBN 978-0874621099. OCLC 260852.
- Mountford, J. F. (December 1948). "The Harvard Edition of Servius". The Classical Review. 62 (3/4): 137–139. doi:10.1017/S0009840X00091708. S2CID 162729636.
- "Two Verse Tributes to the Late E. K. Rand". The Classical Weekly. 44 (10): 152. February 5, 1951.
- Fontenrose, Joseph (1982). Classics at Berkeley: the First Century 1869-1970. Berkeley, California: Department of Classics History Fund. OCLC 9325391.
- Stocker, Arthur F. (1983). "Teaching: Edward Kennard Rand". The American Scholar. 52 (1): 89–97.
- Briggs, Ward W., ed. (1994). Biographical Dictionary of North American Classicists. American Philological Association. ISBN 9780313245602.
- Bowman, John Stewart (1995). The Cambridge Dictionary of American Biography (1st ed.). New York: Cambridge University Press. pp. 596–597. ISBN 9780521402583.
- Stocker, Arthur F. (Winter 1996). "Edward Kennard Rand 1871-1945". The Classical Outlook. 73 (2): 55–56.
- Berrigan, Joseph (September 25, 2022). "Rand, Edward Kennard". Rutgers School of Arts and Sciences.
- "The Sather Professor: Past & Future Professors". University of California, Berkeley Department of Ancient Greek & Roman Studies. September 23, 2022.

Academic offices
Preceded by Paul Shorey	Sather Professorship of Classical Literature; University of California, Berkeley; 1919 to 1920	Succeeded by John A. Scott
