= Robert Getty =

Robert Getty may refer to:

- Robert J. Getty (1908–1963), Classicist and expert on the ancient author Lucan
- Robert Nelson Getty (1855–1941), United States Army officer
