= William Watson Goodwin =

American classical philologist

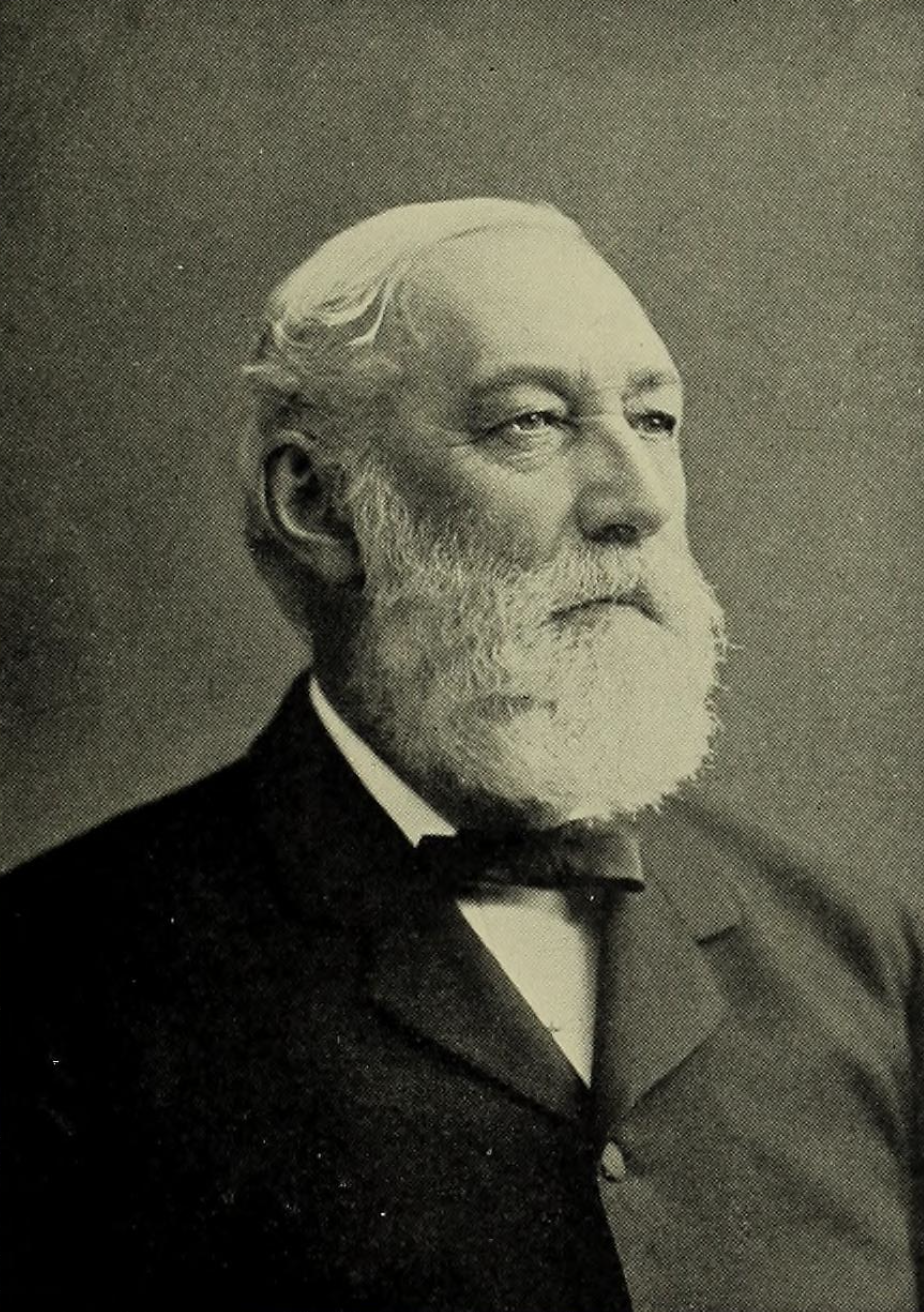
- Goodwin c. 1899
- Born: May 9, 1831; Concord, Massachusetts, U.S.
- Died: June 15, 1912 (aged 81); Cambridge, Massachusetts, U.S.
- Education: Harvard University; University of Göttingen
- Occupations: Academic and classical scholar

1st Director of the American School of Classical Studies at Athens
- In office 1882–1883
- Succeeded by: Lewis Packard

3rd President of the American Philological Association
- In office 1872
- Preceded by: Howard Crosby
- Succeeded by: Asahel C. Kendrick

William Watson Goodwin (May 9, 1831 – June 15, 1912) was an American classical scholar, who served as Eliot Professor of Greek at Harvard University from 1860 to 1901.

== Biography ==
He was born in Concord, Massachusetts, the son of Hersey Bradford Goodwin and Lucrettia Watson.

He graduated at Harvard in 1851, studied at Bonn, Berlin, and Göttingen, receiving a Ph.D. from the latter institution in 1855. He was tutor in Greek at Harvard from 1856 to 1860, and Eliot Professor of Greek there from 1860 until his resignation in 1901. He became an overseer of Harvard in 1903.

In 1882–1883 Goodwin was the first director of the American School of Classical Studies at Athens. He was president of the American Philological Association in 1872 and again in 1885. He was also a member of the Imperial Archaeological Institute of Germany, of the American Academy of Arts and Sciences, the American Philosophical Society, and of the Massachusetts Historical Society, and was a knight of the Greek Order of the Saviour. He was elected a member of the American Antiquarian Society in 1893.

Goodwin edited the Panegyricus of Isocrates (1864) and Demosthenes' On The Crown (1901); and assisted in preparing the seventh edition of Liddell and Scott's Greek-English Lexicon. He revised an English version by several writers of Plutarch's Morals (5 vols, 1871; 6th ed., 1889), and published the Greek text with literal English version of Aeschylus' Agamemnon (1906) for the Harvard production of that play in June 1906.

As a teacher he did much to raise the tone of classical reading from that of a mechanical exercise to literary study. But his most important work was his Syntax of the Moods and Tenses of the Greek Verb (1860), of which the seventh revised edition appeared in 1877 and another (enlarged) in 1890. This was "based in part on Madvig and Krüger," but, besides making accessible to American students the works of these continental grammarians, it presented original matter, including a "radical innovation in the classification of conditional sentences," notably the "distinction between particular and general suppositions."

Goodwin's Greek Grammar (elementary edition 1870; enlarged 1879; revised and enlarged 1892) gradually superseded in most American schools the Grammar of Hadley and Allen. Both the Moods and Tenses and the Grammar in later editions are largely dependent on the theories of Gildersleeve for additions and changes.

Goodwin also wrote a few elaborate syntactical studies, to be found in Harvard Studies in Classical Philology, the twelfth volume of which was dedicated to him upon the completion of fifty years as an alumnus of Harvard and forty-one years as Eliot professor.

William Watson Goodwin died at his home in Cambridge, Massachusetts on June 15, 1912.

== Sources ==
- "Archaeological News: Necrology: William Watson Goodwin". American Journal of Archaeology: 434–435. January–June 1912.
- Wilson, J. G.; Fiske, J., eds. (1900). "Goodwin, William Watson" . Appletons' Cyclopædia of American Biography. New York: D. Appleton.
