= William O. Stephens =

American philosopher

- Born: Lafayette, Indiana
- Occupations: Philosopher, writer
- Known for: Stoicism; Marcus Aurelius; Epictetus

William O. Stephens is an American philosopher whose research centres on ancient Greek and Roman ethics, especially Stoicism and the writings of Marcus Aurelius and Epictetus. He is Professor Emeritus of Philosophy at Creighton University. His books include Marcus Aurelius: A Guide for the Perplexed (2012) and Epictetus’s Encheiridion: A New Translation and Guide to Stoic Ethics (2023). His work has been reviewed in scholarly venues, including Bryn Mawr Classical Review and Ancient Philosophy.

== Biography ==
Stephens was born in Lafayette, Indiana and grew up in West Lafayette where he attended West Lafayette Senior High School and began his study of ancient civilizations and Latin. He studied Philosophy at the College of Wooster for two years before transferring to Earlham College, where he earned his undergraduate degree. Stephens completed his graduate work at the University of Pennsylvania, studying under Charles H. Kahn, Alexander Nehamas, and Martin Ostwald. He received his doctorate in Philosophy in 1990.

In August 1990, he joined the faculty at Creighton University where he received the Omicron Delta Kappa Teaching for Tomorrow award in 2005. During his tenure at Creighton, Stephens published four books and numerous articles on topics including Stoic ethics, Epicureanism, philosophical vegetarianism, personhood, and sex and love. He has also written on being a Stoic and a Chicago Cubs fan, and on the similarities the Jedi philosophy in Star Wars shares with Stoicism. He presented on phobias, terrorism, and Stoic fearlessness at Stoicon in Toronto, Canada, October 14, 2017, and on a Stoic approach to travel and tourism at Stoicon in London, England, September 29, 2018. He is frequently interviewed about topics in Stoicism.

== Vegetarianism ==
Stephens authored an influential paper examining five arguments for vegetarianism. These were the arguments from distributive justice, environmental harm, sexual politics, moral consideration for animals, and the prudential argument from health. He concluded that compassion, humility, and integrity make working toward a meatless diet virtuous.

== Selected publications ==
Books

- Marcus Aurelius: Philosopher-King. London: Reaktion Books, 2025. ISBN 978-1-8363-9116-6.
- Epictetus's Encheiridion: A New Translation and Guide to Stoic Ethics (with Scott Aikin). London: Bloomsbury, 2023. ISBN 978-1-3500-0950-9.
- Marcus Aurelius: A Guide for the Perplexed. London: Continuum, 2012. ISBN 978-1-4411-2561-3.
- Stoic Ethics: Epictetus and Happiness as Freedom. London: Continuum, 2007. ISBN 0-8264-9608-3.
- The Person: Readings in Human Nature. Upper Saddle River, NJ: Pearson, 2006. ISBN 978-0-13-184811-5.
- The Ethics of the Stoic Epictetus, An English Translation, Revised Edition, William O. Stephens, New York: Peter Lang, 2021. ISBN 978-1-4331-7616-6.

Papers

- Five Arguments for Vegetarianism (Philosophy in the Contemporary World, 1994)
- Stoic Naturalism, Rationalism, and Ecology (Environmental Ethics, Fall 1994)
- Epictetus on Fearing Death: Bugbear and Open Door Policy (Ancient Philosophy, Fall 2014)
- Fake Meat (Encyclopedia of Food and Agricultural Ethics, 2018)
- Public Health, Ethical Vegetarianism, and the Harms of the Animal Food Industry (Archives in Biomedical Engineering & Biotechnology, 2019)
- Stoicism and Food Ethics (Symposion, May 2022)

== See also ==
- List of animal rights advocates
