= Culex (disambiguation) =

Culex is a genus of mosquito (family Culicidae).

Culex may also refer to:

- Culex (video game character), a boss character in the video game Super Mario RPG
- Culex (poem), a poem in the Appendix Vergiliana
