= Arthur F. Stocker =

American medievalist

- Born: Arthur Frederick Stocker; January 24, 1914; Bethlehem, Pennsylvania, U.S.
- Died: January 13, 2010 (aged 95); Charlottesville, Virginia, U.S.
- Spouse: Marian West (m. 1968)

Academic background
- Education: Williams College (BA); Harvard University (MA, PhD)
- Thesis: De novo codicum Servianorum genere (1939)
- Influences: E.K. Rand

Academic work
- Discipline: Classics
- Institutions: Bates College; University of Virginia; University of Chicago

Arthur Frederick Stocker (January 24, 1914 – January 13, 2010) was an American medievalist, classicist, and academic. From 1970 until 1971, he served as the president of the Classical Association of the Middle West and South.

== Early life and education ==
Stocker was born on January 24, 1914, in Bethlehem, Pennsylvania. He graduated from George Washington High School as class valedictorian, matriculating at Williams College where, in 1934, he received his Bachelor of Arts, summa cum laude. Stocker would go on to earn a master's degree and Ph.D. from Harvard University. He completed his dissertation, "De novo codicum Servianorum genere," in 1939.

== Academic career ==
Stocker was an instructor in Greek at Bates College from 1941 until 1942. He would spend the majority of his career at the University of Virginia where he began as an assistant professor in the classics before gradually rising to the rank of a full-time professor in 1960. In the summer of 1951, he was a visiting professor at the University of Chicago. Between 1955 and 1963, he served as the chair of the university's classics department, later advancing to become an associate dean of the Graduate School of Arts and Sciences from 1962 until 1966.

== Personal life ==
Stocker married to educator Marian West in 1968.
