= Martin Ostwald =

German-American classical scholar (1922–2010)

- Born: January 15, 1922; Dortmund, Germany
- Died: April 10, 2010 (aged 88); Swarthmore, Pennsylvania, United States
- Citizenship: United States
- Education: University of Toronto (B.A.); University of Chicago (M.A.); Columbia University (Ph.D.)
- Scientific career
- Fields: Classical studies
- Workplaces: Wesleyan University (1952–1953), Columbia University (1953–1958), Swarthmore College (1958–1992), University of Pennsylvania (?–1992)
- Doctoral advisor: Kurt von Fritz
- Notable students: Erich S. Gruen, William O. Stephens

Martin Ostwald (January 15, 1922 – April 10, 2010) was a German-American classical scholar, who taught until 1992 at Swarthmore College and the University of Pennsylvania. His main field of study was the political structures of ancient Greece.

== Early life ==
Born the elder son of a German-Jewish lawyer, Ostwald was raised in Dortmund, where he attended the Municipal Gymnasium (Städtisches Gymnasium). He had always intended to become a classical scholar, but when this possibility was removed by the passage of the Nuremberg Laws of 1935, which closed the German universities to Jews, he decided instead to pursue his interests in teaching and scholarship by becoming a rabbi. But during the Reichskristallnacht on November 9, 1938, Ostwald was arrested together with his father and his younger brother, Ernst. Forced to leave his parents behind in Germany, Ostwald and his brother were able to emigrate to England via the Netherlands on a Kindertransport. In England, however, Ostwald and other German refugees were, in the wake of the British defeat at Dunkirk, transferred to a concentration camp in Canada.

== Education & career ==
Following his release, Ostwald enrolled at the University of Toronto, where he was able to resume his original interest in classical studies. After graduation in 1946 he continued his studies in the (at that time still quite new) Committee on Social Thought at the University of Chicago, where he wrote an M.A. thesis on the treatment of the Orestes myth by Aeschylus, Sophocles, and Euripides. In 1949 he became a doctoral student under fellow German immigrant Kurt von Fritz at Columbia University in New York City. In 1951 he published his first scholarly article on the Prytaneion Decree (IG 1^{3} 131). The following year Ostwald received his Ph.D. after completing his dissertation on the Athenian constitution.

After receiving his Ph.D. Ostwald taught for one year at Wesleyan University. He then returned to Columbia and taught there until 1958, when he joined the Classics Department at Swarthmore College. A few years later he transferred one-third of his teaching to the graduate programs in Classical Studies and Ancient History at the University of Pennsylvania, an arrangement made possible by a special agreement between the two institutions. Ostwald continued to teach undergraduates at Swarthmore and graduate students at Penn until his retirement in 1992. In addition to these primary appointments, Ostwald taught as visiting professor at Princeton University, the University of California at Berkeley, Balliol College, Oxford, at the École des Hautes Études en Sciences Sociales in Paris and, for many years, at Tel Aviv University.

Among Ostwald's many publications, some of the most notable include a translation of Aristotle's Nicomachean Ethics; a handbook on the meters of Greek and Roman poetry, on which he collaborated with Thomas G. Rosenmeyer and James Halporn.) and several books on ancient Greek constitutional history: Nomos and the Beginnings of the Athenian Democracy; Autonomia: Its Genesis and Early History; and his magnum opus, From Popular Sovereignty to the Sovereignty of the Law, for which Ostwald received the Goodwin Award of Merit from the American Philological Association in 1990. A selection of Ostwald's more important papers was published under the title Language and History in Ancient Greek Culture (Philadelphia 2009).

Ostwald was elected President of the American Philological Association in 1987. In 1991 he was elected to the American Academy of Arts and Sciences, and in 1993 he was inducted into the American Philosophical Society. Ostwald was awarded honorary doctorates by the University of Fribourg (Switzerland) in 1995, and by the University of Dortmund, Germany, in 2001.

Ostwald died of heart failure on April 10, 2010.
