= Brooks Otis =

American classical philologist (1908–1977)

Brooks Otis (June 10, 1908 – July 26, 1977) was an American classicist. Otis was born in Boston, and he graduated from Harvard in 1929, took the M.A. in 1930, and received the Ph.D. in 1935. Otis taught at Hobart College from 1935 to 1957, then at American University of Beirut for one year before accepting a position at Stanford University as Professor of Classics. In 1970, he moved to the University of North Carolina at Chapel Hill, where he followed T. Robert S. Broughton as George L. Paddison Professor of Latin. While at Stanford, Otis was one of the founders of the Intercollegiate Center for Classical Studies in Rome, Italy, in 1965. He was a member of the Guild of Scholars of The Episcopal Church.

Otis was known for some of the most concise and penetrating critical essays written on classical literature. His first book, published at the age of 55, was Virgil: A Study in Civilized Poetry (1963), which was immediately recognized as a classic. He also wrote Ovid as an Epic Poet (1966) and the posthumous Cosmos and Tragedy: An Essay on the Meaning of Aeschylus (1981), edited with notes and a preface by E. Christian Kopff), which was part of a long manuscript left unfinished at his death, entitled "The Transcendence of Tragedy".
