= George L. Paddison =

American assistant professor, lawyer, and sales supervisor

George Lucas Paddison
- Born: 9 August 1883
- Died: October 17, 1954 (aged 71); Burgaw, North Carolina, US
- Education: University of North Carolina at Chapel Hill, Kentucky State University and University of Mississippi

George Lucas Paddison (August 9, 1883 – October 17, 1954) was an American assistant professor, lawyer, and sales supervisor.

== Biography ==
Paddison was born in Burgaw, North Carolina on August 9, 1883. He studied chemistry at the University of North Carolina at Chapel Hill. He graduated Phi Beta Kappa in 1905. He studied further at Kentucky State University and received a Master's degree in Chemistry. Afterwards, Paddison taught as an assistant professor of Chemistry at the University of Mississippi while he earned a degree in law. Upon completing his law degree, Paddison practiced law in Greenwood, Mississippi for five years. In 1914 Paddison took a position with West Publishing Company, where he would work for 32 years, retiring in 1946 as supervisor of sales. West Publishing Co. produced law books primarily. Upon retiring, he returned to North Carolina.

Upon his death, he established, by bequest, an endowment at the University of North Carolina at Chapel Hill in the Department of Classics there. This endowment established permanent faculty positions in Classics. The Paddison chair has been held by several luminaries in the field of Classical studies, including Thomas Robert Shannon Broughton, Robert J. Getty, Brooks Otis, George Alexander Kennedy, Jerzy Linderski, William H. Race, and James O'Hara. The current Paddison professor at UNC is Patricia A. Rosenmeyer.

He retired to his hometown of Burgaw, North Carolina. He died on October 17, 1954. He is buried in Burgaw Cemetery.
