= Dorothy Mae Robathan =

American classicist and philologist

Dorothy Mae Robathan (May 11, 1898 – December 29, 1991) was an American palaeographer, philologist and archaeologist specialising in classical and medieval texts, and the topography of ancient Rome. She was the president of the American Philological Association in 1965.

== Early life and education ==
Robathan was born on May 11, 1898, in Scranton, Pennsylvania. She was the daughter of Edward and Emilie Robathan. Robathan studied for her BA at Wellesley College, Massachusetts, and achieved her MA from Columbia in 1921. After teaching at Walnut Hill School from 1921-1925, she studied in the American Academy in Rome from 1925-1926. From 1926-1927, Robathan was the head of the Latin department at Williston Northampton School and completed her PhD from the University of Chicago in 1929.

== Academic career ==
Robathan returned to Wellesley College in 1930 as a Professor of Latin, where she would remain until 1963, and as a Professor Emerita thereafter. Robathan likewise served from 1948-1960 as a fellow of the American Academy in Rome. From 1964-1965, Robathan served as the president of the American Philological Association.

During this time, she published numerous articles on classical, medieval, and Renaissance manuscripts. In 1950, she published her comprehensive book on Roman architectural development, The Monuments of Ancient Rome.
