= Elizabeth Hazelton Haight =

American classical scholar and academic

- Born: December 11, 1872; Auburn, New York, United States
- Died: November 15, 1964 (aged 91); Beacon, New York, United States
- Occupations: Academic, scholar

Academic background
- Education: Cornell University
- Thesis: The Sea in Greek Poetry (1909)

Academic work
- Discipline: Classics
- Sub-discipline: Latin literature, Greek poetry
- Institutions: Vassar College

Elizabeth Hazelton "Hazel" Haight (February 11, 1872 – November 15, 1964) was an American classical scholar and academic who specialised in Latin teaching. She spent most of her career working for Vassar College in Poughkeepsie, New York. Haight was the second female president of the American Philological Association, and first woman to chair the Advisory Council of the American School of Classical Studies at Rome. She published eleven books in the field of Classics, as well as histories of Vassar and James Monroe Taylor. Her works focused on Latin Literature and the Greek novel, before she began the study of symbolism in Latin literature in her final publications. She was involved in Vassar's war efforts during World War I, and supporting foreign scholars during World War II, and was consistently interested in promoting women's education as a force for good in American society.

== Career ==
Elizabeth Hazelton "Hazel" Haight was born in Auburn, to John White Haight and Helen M. Haight née Meeker. Her father was one of the leading businessmen in Auburn during his lifetime. She began studying Classics at school in Auburn, and attributed her love of the subject to the influence of her mother, who had read and enjoyed Virgil in her own schooldays, and who had been a decisive factor in Haight's going to college.

Haight matriculated at Vassar College in 1890, and was commencement speaker for her undergraduate class, graduating from Vassar with a degree in Classics in 1894. She also edited the yearbook for that year, and was awarded a retrospective membership to Phi Beta Kappa. During the course of her studies, some of her poems were published in The Miscellany News. After graduation, Haight taught at schools in the New York area, including Rye Seminary School in Rye (1894-1895), the Emma Willard School in Troy (1895-1900), and the Packer Collegiate Institute in Brooklyn (1900-1901). She received her AM, also from Vassar, in 1899, with a dissertation entitled "Conditional Sentences in the Iliad and the Odyssey". As she was teaching at the time, her MA was received in absentia. She then moved to Cornell University, where she studied with Charles E. Bennett, and received her PhD with a thesis entitled The Sea in Greek Poetry in 1909.

Haight returned to Vassar to join its faculty in 1902, working at Vassar alongside studying for her PhD. She became an associate professor in 1910, and was promoted to professor in 1922, partly due to the strong written support of Grace Macurdy, another pioneering female classicist at Vassar. In her correspondence, Macurdy praised Haight for her "executive ability" and described her as a teacher "whose enthusiasm and genuine love for her subject infect her classes". Haight's association with Macurdy continued throughout her career, as both taught together at Vassar for the remainder of their careers, and became close friends. This association also included their shared efforts in the public campaign to resist the removal of Bert Hodge Hill from his position at the American School of Classical Studies at Athens in the 1920s. Haight became chair of the Latin department at Vassar in 1923, and remained in this position until her retirement in 1942.

Haight was the first woman to chair the Advisory Council of the then American School of Classical Studies at Rome, and in 1931 received a summer appointment to lecture at the University of Chicago. She was also elected as president of the American Philological Association in 1934 – the second woman to hold that post. Her presidential address was entitled "Prose Fiction in the Augustan Age". During the mid-1930s, many scholars were emigrating from Germany under Nazi rule; Haight organized a program of these visiting scholars to Vassar College. She had similarly been influential in Vassar’s war efforts during the First World War, acting as chair of the Faculty Committee on War Activities, as she believed that both Vassar and women were essential to the fight to protect democracy in the United States.

During her long residency at Vassar College, Haight opened and voluntarily curated the Vassar Classical Museum, buying objects and inscriptions for it. This appreciation for the contributions of archaeology to a classical education was described by the classicist Donald Lateiner as "ahead of its time". She also wrote a history of the college, along with James Monroe Taylor, its president from 1886 to 1914. Upon meeting Mussolini in Italy in 1935, Haight presented him with works written about Italy by Vassar faculty. She gave the convocation address at Vassar twice – once upon her appointment to professor in 1922, and again in 1941. Her second address was called "Education for Service", and demonstrated her commitment to the education of Vassar women as part of empowering them, and preparing them to be "strong citizens of the republic and the world" rather than "privileged princesses". She retired in 1942, but continued to be an active part of Vassar’s community, including giving a speech praising Vassar and arguing for the role of education in benefiting the state of the country at Founders' Day 1952. That same year, the Elizabeth Hazelton Haight Fund for Research in Classics was established by a group of Vassar alumnae, honoring her work. Haight was remembered both through this fund and the testimony of her colleagues for her support of students and faculty at Vassar throughout her time at the college.

Haight died November 15, 1964, in Beacon, Dutchess County and is buried in Fort Hill Cemetery. At the 1965 meeting of the American Philological Association, Lily Ross Taylor read a tribute to Haight that praised her "devotion to the Classics and the "great achievement" of her teaching. Her obituary in The New York Times said she was "regarded at Vassar as the last of her era of outstanding women who dedicated their lives to the college".

== Scholarship ==
Haight published eleven books on classical subjects, as well as histories of Vassar and James Monroe Taylor. Her first book in the field of Classics, Italy Old and New, published in 1922, featured a collection of essays and photos that drew on her own travels to classical sites (including a visit to Ostia Antica, and a search for Horace's Villa at Licenza). The book was aimed at a lay audience (a common theme among her later publications), and made no use of notes or references. Nonetheless, Haight's classical knowledge informed the project throughout. Haight followed this work with research primarily on Latin literature – a topic that Haight worried had been falling out of favour in Classics, with archaeology and history becoming more popular. These books, Horace and His Art of Enjoyment (1925), Apuleius and His Influence (1927), Romance in the Latin Elegiac Poets (1932) and The Roman Use of Anecdotes in Cicero, Livy and the Satirists (1940) were all aimed at popular rather than scholarly audiences, and drew on a wide range of sources, both scholarly and otherwise. The works were variously described as "enthusiastic", "charming", and "interesting".

From her work on Apuleius, Haight moved on to consider work in less popular genres, such fiction beyond the novel (Essays in Ancient Fiction (1936)), and the Greek novel (Essays on the Greek Romances (1943)) – the latter being a particularly unpopular genre for study at the time, as Haight herself noted. This work was followed by More Essays on Greek Romances (1945). Both books were criticised by reviewers, and were not particularly popular. However, her interest in this genre at a time when it was generally neglected by scholars has led to her work being described as "pioneering". Her two penultimate books, the last published when she was 80, took up the topic of symbolism – first The Symbolism of the House Door (1950) and then Aspects of Symbolism in the Latin Anthology and in Classical and Renaissance Art (1952). Haight's final published book was a translation of Pseudo-Callisthenes' Life of Alexander, published in 1955. In addition, she published multiple articles in a range of classical journals.

== Selected publications ==
- Vassar with James M. Taylor. New York, Oxford University Press. 1915.
- The Autobiography and Letters of Matthew Vassar. New York, Oxford University Press. 1916.
- Life and Letters of James M. Taylor. New York, E.P. Dutton & Company, 1919. OCLC 3433918
- Italy Old and New. London, Stanley Paul & Co. 1922.
- Horace and His Art of Enjoyment. New York, Dutton. 1925. OCLC 250063956
- Apuleius and His Influence. New York, Longmans Green & Co. 1927. OCLC 367528670
- Romance in the Latin Elegiac Poets. New York, Longmans Green. 1932. OCLC 938038
- Essays on Ancient Fiction. New York, Longmans Green. 1936. OCLC 39970129
- The Roman Use of Anecdotes in Cicero, Livy and the Satirists. New York, Longmans Green. 1940.
- Essays on the Greek Romances. New York, Longmans. 1943. OCLC 251464618; Nachdruck Port Washington (New York), 1965.
- More Essays on the Greek Romances. New York, Longmans Green. 1945. OCLC 459716756
- The Symbolism of the House Door in Classical Poetry. New York, Longmans Green. 1950. OCLC 906181909
- Aspects of Symbolism in the Latin Anthology and in Classical and Renaissance Art. New York, Longmans Green. 1952.
- Pseudo-Callisthenes, Life of Alexander. New York, Longmans. 1955. OCLC 459039241
