= George A. Kennedy (classicist) =

American classicist (1928–2022)

George Alexander Kennedy (November 26, 1928 – July 28, 2022) was an American scholar of classical rhetoric and literature.

== Biography ==
George Alexander Kennedy was born in Hartford, Connecticut on November 26, 1928. He received his Ph.D. in classics from Harvard University in 1954 with a dissertation entitled "Prolegomena and Commentary to Quintilian VIII (PR. & 1-3)". Kennedy taught classics, comparative literature, and rhetoric at the University of North Carolina at Chapel Hill for twenty-eight years. He retired as George L. Paddison professor of classics. He received a Guggenheim fellowship in 1959. He was a Fellow of the American Academy of Arts and Sciences and was elected a member of the American Philosophical Society. Under President Jimmy Carter and President Ronald Reagan, Kennedy served on the National Council on the Humanities and was also president of the American Philological Association and of the International Society for the History of Rhetoric.

Kennedy served as the editor of the American Journal of Philology.

George A. Kennedy died in Spring, Texas on July 28, 2022, at the age of 93.

== Selected publications ==
- 1989-2013. The Cambridge history of literary criticism. Cambridge University Press.
- 1994. A new history of classical rhetoric : with additional discussion of late Latin rhetoric. Princeton University Press.
