= Martin Luther D'Ooge =

American classical philologist

- Born: 17 July 1839; Zonnemaire, Netherlands
- Died: 12 September 1915 (aged 76); Ann Arbor, Michigan, U.S.
- Occupations: Classics scholar and professor
- Years active: 1868–1912

Martin Luther D'Ooge (17 July 1839 in Zonnemaire, Netherlands – 12 September 1915 in Ann Arbor, Michigan, United States) was a Dutch-born American classics scholar. His Huguenot family emigrated to the US in 1851.

He was Professor of Greek Language and Literature at the University of Michigan from 1868 to 1912.

== Life ==
Martin Luther D'Ooge came from a Huguenot family, who emigrated from the Netherlands to the United States of America around 1851 and settled in Grand Rapids, Michigan. His father Leonard was a painter; his mother was born Johanna Quintus. His nephew was the philologist Benjamin Leonard D'Ooge (1860–1940).

D'Ooge studied Classical Philology at the University of Michigan, to which he remained connected all his life. After being awarded his bachelor's degree in 1862, he became headmaster of the Ann Arbor High School in 1863, a position he held until 1865. From 1864 to 1867 he studied theology at the Union Theological Seminary, by which he was awarded a master's degree in 1865.

In 1867 he was appointed Assistant Professor of Ancient Languages at Michigan State Normal School (later Eastern Michigan University). However, he left after only one year, returning to the University of Michigan as Acting Professor of Greek language and literature.

In 1870 he was appointed full Professor and received a two-year sabbatical, which he used for a long educational trip to Germany. There he deepened his knowledge, studying under the philologists Georg Curtius and Justus Hermann Lipsius, and with them was awarded a Doctorate of Philosophy in 1872.

On his return to the US, D'Ooge resumed his teaching activities at the University of Michigan. From 1889 to 1897 he was the Dean of the College of Literature and Science. During his career in Michigan, D'Ooge also participated in scientific associations. In 1869, he was a founder member of the American Philological Association, and its president in 1883/84. In 1886/87 he was the yearly-appointed director of the American School of Classical Studies at Athens. From 1889 to 1897 he was Dean of the College of Literature and Science.

He retired in 1912.

== Awards ==
- 1899, University of Michigan, Doctor of Letters.
- 1901, Rutgers University, Doctor of Literature.

== Publications ==
D'Ooge's scientific work began in Leipzig after his studies. He wrote several studies on the Attic speaker Demosthenes and on Sophocles, as well as editions of Demosthenes' speech On the Crown in 1875, and Sophocles' Antigone. After a stay in Athens, he prepared a book on the Acropolis, which appeared in 1908. His last work was a translation of the Introduction to the Arithmetic by the Greek mathematician Nicomachos of Gerasa, published posthumously in 1926.

D'Ooge's scientific estate is held by the Bentley Historical Library.

- On the use of the suffixes τερ, τορ, τηρ, τα in Homer (1872 dissertation). Leipzig.
- The oration of Demosthenes On the Crown. With extracts from the oration of Aeschines against Ctesiphon, and explanatory notes (1876). Chicago.
- Sophocles: Antigone. Edited on the basis of Wolff’s edition by M.L. D'Ooge (1994). Boston.
- The Acropolis of Athens (1908). New York/London.
- Nicomachus: Introduction to Arithmetic (1926). New York/London. Reprinted 1955.

== Sources ==
- Bonner, Campbell (1915). "Martin Luther D'Ooge in memoriam". Classical Philology. 10 (4): 488. doi:10.1086/360042. S2CID 224793526.
- Briggs, Ward W. (1994). "D'Ooge, Martin Luther". Biographical Dictionary of North American Classicists. Westport, Connecticut/London: Greenwood: 139. ISBN 978-0-313-24560-2.
