= Benjamin Leonard D'Ooge =

American classicist

- Born: January 10, 1860; Grand Rapids, Michigan
- Died: March 7, 1940 (aged 80); Allentown, Pennsylvania
- Occupations: Classicist (Latin); author; academic
- Spouse: Jennie E. Pease (m. 1885)

Academic background
- Education: University of Michigan (BA, MA); University of Bonn (PhD)
- Thesis: De particularum copulativarum apud Caesarem et pseudo-caesarianos scriptores usu (1901)

Academic work
- Discipline: Classics
- Institutions: Michigan State Normal College

Benjamin Leonard D'Ooge (1860–1940) was an American classical scholar who specialized in Latin language education for high school students.

D'Ooge was born January 10, 1860, in Grand Rapids, Michigan. His parents were Leonard and Johanna Quintus. They were both immigrants from Holland who had immigrated to America in 1851, settling in New York. His brother was the academic Martin Luther D'Ooge.

He attended Grand Rapids High School, then the University of Michigan, where he earned a Bachelor of Arts (1881) and Master of Arts (1884). In 1901, he received earned a Doctor of Philosophy from the University of Bonn.

He married Jennie E. Pease on June 25, 1885. The couple had at least one child.

D'Ooge started his career as a principal at Coldwater High School, where he also taught physics and chemistry. After receiving his master's degree, he taught Latin at the University of Michigan. In 1886, he joined the Michigan State Normal College as the department head of Ancient Languages. He continued to serve as a professor of Latin Language at Michigan State Normal College from until 1936.

He died on March 7, 1940, in Allentown, Pennsylvania.

== Publications ==
D'Ooge is the author of a number of notable books:

- Colloquia Latina: Adapted to the Beginners' Books of Jones
- Elements of Latin
- Latin for Beginners
- Latin Composition for Secondary Schools
