= Thomas G. Rosenmeyer =

German-American classicist

- Born: April 3, 1920; Hamburg, Germany
- Died: February 6, 2007 (aged 86); Oakland, California, U.S.
- Education: McMaster University
- Scientific career
- Fields: Classics
- Workplaces: University of California, Berkeley

Thomas Gustav Rosenmeyer (April 3, 1920 – February 6, 2007) was a German-American classical scholar. He was a Professor Emeritus for Classics and Comparative Literature at the University of California, Berkeley. His main interest was the literature of classical Greece, especially Plato.

== Biography ==
Rosenmeyer was born on April 3, 1920, in Hamburg and attended the Gelehrtenschule des Johanneums from 1930 to 1938. He left Germany for England in 1939, and was interned for being a German citizen and transferred to Canada, where Martin Ostwald and Emil Fackenheim were in the same camp. After being released in 1942, he graduated from McMaster University in 1944, completing his M.A. at the University of Toronto in 1945 and Ph.D. at Harvard in 1949. He was a faculty member at the University of Iowa, Smith College and the University of Washington before he went to the University of California, Berkeley.

Rosenmeyer was elected to the American Academy of Arts and Sciences in 1987 and the American Philosophical Society in 2000.

He died of cardiac arrest at his home in Oakland on February 6, 2007.
