= Robert J. Getty =

Northern Irish classicist (1908–1963)

Robert John Getty (February 5, 1908, in Northern Ireland – October 24, 1963) was a Classicist and expert on the ancient author Lucan.

Getty earned an A.B. from Queens University, Belfast, in 1928 and a master's degree from St John's College, Cambridge in 1930, where he was lecturer from 1937–1947. He became professor of Latin at the University of Toronto in 1947. In 1958 he became the first George L. Paddison Professor of Latin at the University of North Carolina at Chapel Hill.

He was a fellow of the Royal Society of Canada and president of the American Philological Association in 1959.

== Scholarship ==
- 1979. M. Annaei Lucani De bello civili liber I. New York: Arno Press.
