= Lewis Packard =

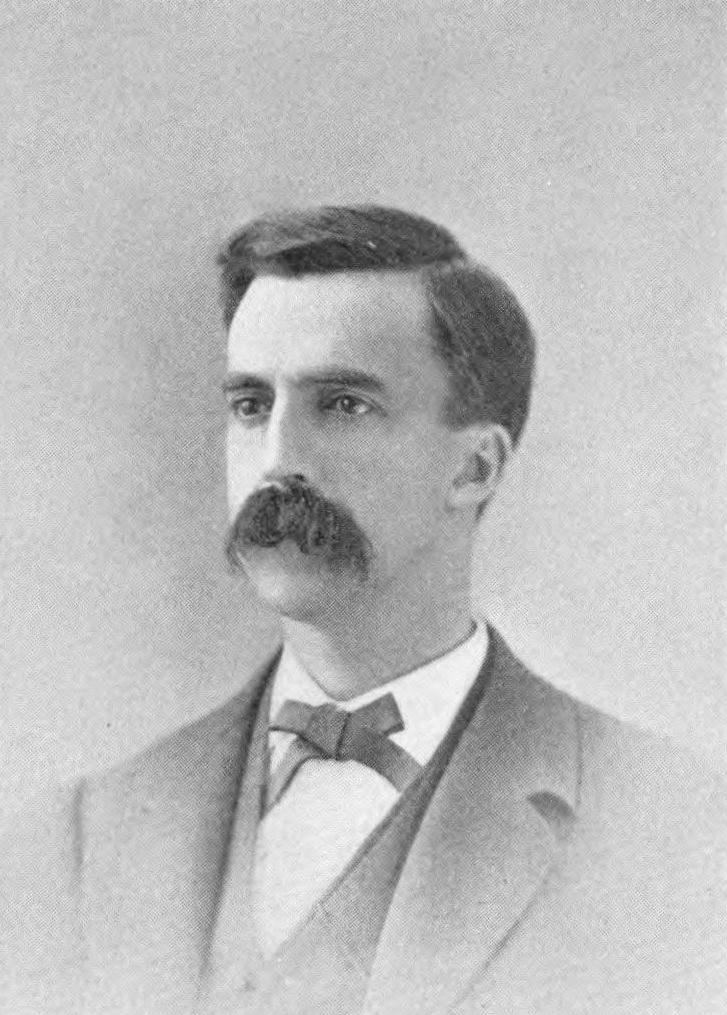
- Born: August 22, 1836; Philadelphia
- Died: October 26, 1884
- Education: Yale University
- Employer: Yale University (1859–1884)

Lewis Richard Packard (1836-1884) was an American scholar, best known for his work, Morality and Religion of the Greeks.

== Early life ==
He was born on August 22, 1836 in Philadelphia, and his father was Friedrich Adolphus Packard. He graduated from Yale in 1856 with the intention of entering the ministry, but following a year of study at Berlin in 1857-8, a tour of Greece confirmed him as a Hellenist.

== Yale professor ==
He returned to Yale and served as tutor (1859–63), and upon receipt of his Ph.D. in 1863, he was hired as Professor of Greek at the age of 27. In 1866, he was named Hillhouse Professor of Greek.

His career was focused on teaching Greek language, literature, and culture. With John Williams White (1849–1917) of Harvard, he began the “College Series of Greek Authors” series of textbooks, but he was soon replaced by his colleague Thomas Day Seymour.

At the age of 35 he was diagnosed with a chronic illness, but he maintained an active professional life in spite of it. He chiefly published articles in organs of the American Philological Association, of which he was President in 1880-1.

In 1881 he published his most significant work, ‘’Morality and Religion of the Greeks’’ and was a leader in the founding of the American School of Classical Studies at Athens, of which he was its second director, succeeding William Watson Goodwin in 1883-4.

== Death ==
Following a trip to Athens to visit the school during his directorship, he fell ill and died in New Haven on October 26, 1884, at the age of 48.

== Publications ==
- "On Some Points in the Life of Thucydides," Transactions of the American Philological Association 4 (1873) 47-59
- "On a Passage in Homer's Odyssey (x.81-86)," Transactions of the American Philological Association 5 (1873) 31-41
- "On Grote's Theory of the Structure of the Iliad," Transactions of the American Philological Association 7 (1876) 24-45
- "Notes on Certain Passages in the Phaedo and the Gorgias of Plato," Transactions of the American Philological Association 8 (1877) 5-17
- "The Beginning of a Written Literature in Greece," Transactions of the American Philological Association 11 (1880) 34-51
- "Geddes's Problem of the Homeric Poems," American Journal of Philology 1 (1880) 32-44
- Morality and Religion of the Greeks (New Haven, 1881; abstract at Proceedings of the American Philological Association 12 [1881] 7-9)
- Studies in Greek Thought: Essays Selected from the Papers of Lewis R. Packard (Boston, 1886)
