= Jotham Bradbury Sewall =

American classicist (1825–1913)

- Born: October 3, 1825; Newcastle, Maine, U.S.
- Died: June 16, 1913 (aged 87); Brookline, Massachusetts, U.S.
- Education: Bowdoin College
- Spouse: Frances Louisa Swett
- Scientific career
- Fields: Classics

Jotham Bradbury Sewall (October 3, 1825 - June 16, 1913) was an American classicist, historian, and translator of classical works.

== Biography ==
He was born on October 3, 1825 in Newcastle, Maine.

He died on June 16, 1913 in Brookline, Massachusetts.

== Education ==
He completed his B.A. degree at Bowdoin College in 1848. He completed his M.A. degree in 1851. He completed his D.D. degree in 1894. He joined the D.D. Bangor Theological Seminary in 1854. He joined the Andover Theological Seminary in 1854-5. He was ordained as a priest in 1855.

== Career ==
He taught classics at a number of high schools in Maine state. In 1865, Sewall became a professor of Greek at Bowdoin College, where he stayed until 1877. He served as headmaster of Thayer Academy in Braintree, Massachusetts from 1877 to 1896. From 1877 to 1878 Sewall was the president of the American Philological Association.

== Personal life ==
Sewall married Frances Louisa Swett in 1855 and married Emelyn French, sister of Asa P. French, in 1909.

== Bibliography ==
He is the author of books:

- The Timon of Lucian: Fritzsche's Text
- Evenings with the Bible and Science
- A Memoir of Rev. Jotham Sewall, of Chesterville, Maine

== See also ==
- Bowdoin College
- Bangor Theological Seminary
