= Thomas Robert Shannon Broughton =

Canadian classical scholar (1900–1993)

Thomas Robert Shannon Broughton FBA
- Born: February 17, 1900; Corbetton, Ontario, Canada
- Died: September 17, 1993 (aged 93); Chapel Hill, North Carolina, U.S.
- Education: University of Toronto (B.A., 1921); Johns Hopkins University (Ph.D., 1928)
- Occupations: professor, classical scholar, Roman historian, author
- Known for: Latin prosopography; Magistrates of the Roman Republic

Thomas Robert Shannon Broughton (/ˈbrɔːtən/; 17 February 1900 – 17 September 1993) was a Canadian classical scholar and leading Latin prosopographer of the twentieth century. He is especially noted for his definitive three-volume work, Magistrates of the Roman Republic (1951–1986).

== Life and career ==
Broughton was born in 1900 in Corbetton, Ontario. He attended Victoria College at the University of Toronto, where he received a BA in 1921 with honours in classics and earned his MA in 1922. After studying at the University of Chicago, he was made a Rogers Fellow at Johns Hopkins University, where he received a PhD in Latin in 1928, having studied under the famed ancient historian Tenney Frank (1876–1939).

He began his teaching career at Victoria College, Toronto. Broughton went on to teach at Amherst College for a year in 1926–1927, and started at Bryn Mawr College from 1928 after his PhD completed through 1965, when he translated to be the George L. Paddison Professor of Latin at the University of North Carolina at Chapel Hill (1965–1971). The Library Epigraphy Room, created at Chapel Hill at his behest, remains a seminal resource. Although he retired from Chapel Hill in 1971 (then aged 71), he would continue to work and advise students until he died in 1993.

In 1931, he married Annie Leigh Hobson Broughton of Norfolk, Virginia. They had two children, Margaret Broughton Tenney and T. Alan Broughton (b. 1936), a poet and pianist and professor emeritus of the University of Vermont. Mrs. Broughton died on September 19, 2005, in Charleston, South Carolina.

== Magistrates of the Roman Republic ==
Broughton's main scholarly work was his massive, three-volume Magistrates of the Roman Republic (commonly abbreviated MRR), published from 1951 to 1986 and requiring more than 30 years to complete. The project provides an unparalleled accounting of the names of men elected to office during the Roman Republic and has become a standard reference work. It provides a year-by-year list of all known office-holders, including not only the magistracies of the cursus honorum from consul to quaestor, but also promagistracies and military commands in the provinces, legates (both official and ad hoc), military prefects, priesthoods, and special commissions. Each entry is documented with ancient sources and selected works of modern scholarship. An index by name, listing each man's known offices, appears in volume 2.

The work was started in the early 1930s, inspired by the older Prosopographia Imperii Romani which catalogued the political elite of the Roman Empire; it also continued on the Wilhelm Drumann's Geschichte Roms (1897–98) and Friedrich Münzer's Römische Adelsparteien und Adelsfamilien (1920) which in the 1950s were some of the main prosopographical works. By 1939, with the wrapping up of his work on Tenney Frank's Economic Survey of Ancient Rome, he started work on Magistrates, which started to consume much of his time and that of his student assistants from 1941 onwards.

In 1953 the Magistrates of the Roman Republic were recognized with the Charles J. Goodwin Award of Merit from the American Philological Association.

== Achievements and awards ==
Broughton's career included a variety of academic appointments and awards: visiting professor at Johns Hopkins University, Simon F. Guggenheim Memorial Foundation Fellow, holder of a Fulbright research grant to Italy and professor in charge of the School of Classical Studies of the American Academy in Rome.

Broughton served as president of the American Philological Association and as vice president of the International Federation of Societies of Classical Studies for 10 years. He was a member of the American Philosophical Society, a fellow of the American Academy of Arts and Sciences, an honorary member of the Society for the Promotion of Roman Studies, a corresponding member of the German Archaeological Institute and a corresponding Fellow of the British Academy. Three universities awarded him honorary LL.D. degrees: Johns Hopkins University in 1969, the University of Toronto in 1971 and UNC in 1974.

After Broughton's death in September 1993, a Colloquium was organised for November 1994 at the University of North Carolina at Chapel Hill in honour of his memory. The papers delivered on this occasion, including those by eminent scholars such as T.P. Wiseman, Erich S. Gruen, and Ernst Badian, later formed the basis of the honorific volume Imperium Sine Fine: T. Robert S. Broughton and the Roman Republic, edited by J. Linderski.

== Works ==
- [dissertation] The Romanization of Africa Proconsularis (1929, reissued 1968).
- 1936. "Was Sallust Fair to Cicero?" Transactions and Proceedings of the American Philological Association 67:34-46.
- Magistrates of the Roman Republic (1951–1986).
- 1934. "Roman Landholding in Asia Minor." Transactions and Proceedings of the American Philological Association 65:207-239.
- "Roman Asia Minor", in Tenney Frank, An Economic Survey of Ancient Rome IV (1938)
- 1946. "Notes on Roman Magistrates. I. The Command of M. Antonius in Cilicia. II. Lucullus' Commission and Pompey's Acta." Transactions and Proceedings of the American Philological Association 77:35-43.
- 1991. "Candidates Defeated in Roman Elections: Some Ancient Roman 'Also-rans'" Transactions of the American Philological Association 81.4: 1-64.

== Students ==
- 1969. Packard, Jane. Official Notices in Livy’s Fourth Decade: Style and Treatment. Ph.D., Department of Classics, University of North Carolina at Chapel Hill.
- 1969. Wade, Donald W. The Roman Auxiliary Units and Camps in Dacia. Ph.D., Department of Classics, University of North Carolina at Chapel Hill
- 1971. Houston, George W. Roman Imperial Administrative Personnel During the Principates of Vespasian and Titus (AD 69-81). Ph.D., Department of Classics, University of North Carolina at Chapel Hill.
- 1973. Goldsberry, Mary. Sicily and its Cities in Hellenistic and Roman Times. Ph.D., Department of Classics, University of North Carolina at Chapel Hill.
- 1974. Harrison, James Geraty. The Official Priests of Rome in the Reigns of Trajan and Hadrian. Ph.D., Department of Classics, University of North Carolina at Chapel Hill.

== Sources ==
- Linderski, Jerzy, ed. (1996). Imperium sine fine. Stuttgart: Franz Steiner Verlag. ISBN 3-515-06948-8.
  - Houston, George W. "Broughton remembered". In Linderski (1996), pp. 35–42.
  - Ridley, Ronald T. "T R S Broughton and Fredrich Münzer". In Linderski (1996), pp. 43–56.
- Jerzy Linderski in BDNAC pp. 64–66.
- Broughton, T Robert S (2008). Brennan, T Corey; et al. (eds.). Autobiography: a scholar's life. American Journal of Ancient History. ISBN 978-1-59333-837-4.
