= Abby Leach =

American educator and professor of Greek and Latin

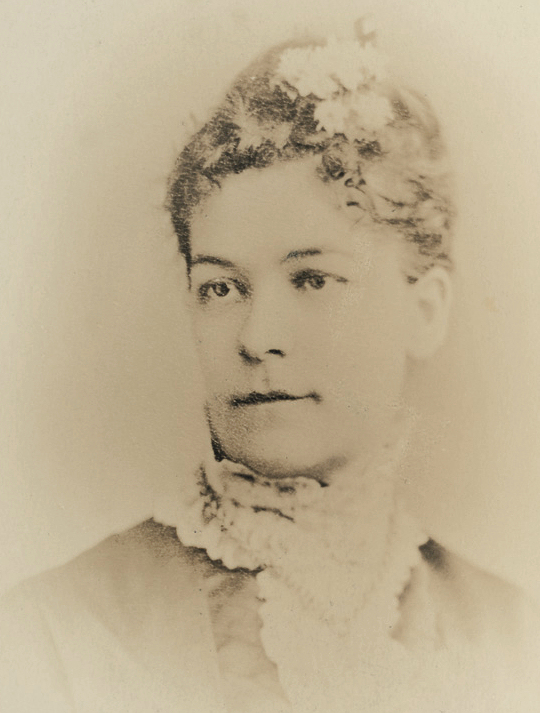
- Abby Leach
- Born: May 28, 1855
- Died: December 29, 1918 (aged 63)
- Occupation(s): Professor of Greek and Latin

Abby Leach (May 28, 1855 – December 29, 1918) was as an American educator and professor of Greek and Latin at Vassar College. She was appointed as the first female president of the American Philological Association in 1899.

== Formative years and family ==
Born in Brockton, Massachusetts on May 28, 1855, Abby Leach was one of five children of Marcus and Eliza Paris Bourne Leach. Her father was an owner of a shoemaking business.

She began reading Latin at an early age at Brockton High School. She graduated Brockton at age fourteen in 1869, and attended Oread Institute, where she learned Greek. At the age of sixteen, Leach briefly taught at Brockton High, then went back to Oread, where she taught from 1873 to 1878.

She was one of the first female students at Harvard University, enrolling in a "Plan for Private Collegiate Instruction of Women" upon its establishment in 1879 at her behest. The "Plan" led to the later establishment of Radcliffe College.

== Career ==
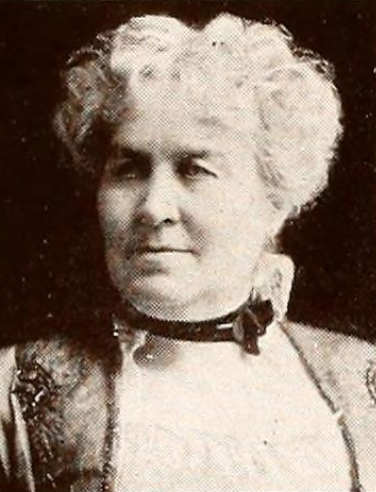
Abby Leach, from the 1917 yearbook of Vassar College

Because Harvard did not award degrees to women at the time that Leach was enrolled there, Vassar College granted her Bachelor's and Master's degrees after they appointed her to the Vassar faculty in 1883. She was a professor of Greek and Latin there from that time until her death in 1918.

She was a member of the Greek Conference of the Committee of Ten called by the National Education Association in 1894, the only female member of any conference of the Committee of Ten.

Long interested in improving educational opportunities for women in Japan, she was presented with a gold cup by Emperor Meiji in 1898 for her success in this regard.

In 1899, she became the first female president of the American Philological Association. From 1899 to 1901, Leach was president of the Association of Collegiate Alumnae which later became the American Association of University Women.

In 1918, The New York Times observed that "Abby Leach gives the Greek more of the modern conception of fate and free-will than does Boeckh."

== Illness, death and interment ==
In failing health due to cancer during her early sixties, she was cared for at her home in her final days by her sisters, Anna and Edith Leach. Abby Leach died from cancer at her home at the age of sixty-three on December 29, 1918, and was buried in Brockton.
