= Minton Warren =

American classical scholar

Minton Warren (29 January 1850 – 26 November 1907), American classical scholar, was born at Pawtucket, Rhode Island, on 29 January 1850, a descendant of Richard Warren, who sailed on the Mayflower in 1620.

== Biography ==
Warren was educated at Tufts College and subsequently at Yale. After three years as a schoolmaster, he went to Germany to complete his studies in comparative philology and especially in Latin language and literature. Having taken the degree of doctor of philosophy at Strasbourg in 1879, he returned to the United States as Latin professor at Johns Hopkins University.

In 1899 he was appointed Latin professor at Harvard. His life-work was a new edition of Terence, which, however, he left unfinished at his death. He was director of the American School of Classical Studies in Rome (1897–1899), and president of the American Philological Association (1898). He died suddenly of heart failure on 26 November 1907 in Cambridge, Massachusetts.

== Works ==
Among his publications are: Enclitic Ne in Early Latin (Strassburg dissertation, reprinted in Amer. Journ. of Philol., 1881); On Latin Glossaries, with especial reference to the Codex Sangal-lensis (St. Gall Glossary) (Cambridge, U.S.A., 1885); The Stele Inscription in the Roman Forum (Amer. Journ. of Philol., vol. xxviii. No. 3, and separately in 1908).

== Family ==
He married Salomé Amelia Machado on 29 December 1885; she was from Cuba and received her BA from Smith College in 1883, making her the first Latina to graduate from Smith.
