= Classical Association of New England =

- Formation: 1906
- Type: Learned society
- Headquarters: Providence, Rhode Island
- Location: United States
- President: Amanda Loud
- Subsidiaries: New England Classical Journal
- Website: caneweb.org

The Classical Association of New England (CANE) is a professional organization for scholars and teachers of classical antiquity in New England. CANE was founded in 1906 by a group of "concerned collegiate Hellenists" led by George Edwin Howes of Williams College. Howes became the first Secretary-Treasurer of CANE and served in that capacity until 1920. Charles D. Adams of Dartmouth College was the first president.

== Overview ==
CANE was founded in 1906, one year after the Classical Association of the Middle West and South was founded in Chicago in 1905 as the first regional classical organization in the United States. CANE has always included both college and school teachers. Of the seven papers presented at the first meeting, three were given by college faculty and four by high-school faculty Since about 1995 it has been customary to elect the president alternately from school and college faculty, and the Annual Meeting is held on both college and school campuses throughout New England.

CANE holds an annual meeting in March of each year. It publishes the New England Classical Journal and, through the CANE Press, a collection of pedagogical materials. Each summer CANE runs the CANE Summer Institute, a two-week school with courses in classical literature, history, and art, and lectures open to the general public.

== CANE Awards ==
CANE gives several awards to members, almost all named for members and benefactors of the association. The oldest is the Cornelia Catlin Coulter Rome Scholarship, which provides funds for the recipient to attend the summer session of the American School of Classical Studies in Rome. Cornelia C. Coulter (d. 1960), a professor at Mount Holyoke College, anonymously provided the first funds for this award in 1947, while she was president of CANE; she later served as president of the American Philological Association.

The Matthew I. Wiencke Teaching Prize is awarded each year to a teacher in an elementary or secondary school. It is named for Matthew I. Wiencke (d. 1997), of Dartmouth College. He was one of the founders of the CANE Summer Institute and was executive secretary of CANE from 1989 to 1993.

The Edward Phinney Fellowship, awarded every three years since 1998, provides support for Ancient Greek programs in secondary schools.

The Phyllis B. Katz Student Prize for Excellence in Undergraduate Research is awarded each year to a student whose paper is accepted for presentation at the CANE annual meeting. There is also a writing contest for high-school students.

The most prestigious of CANE's awards is the Barlow-Beach Award for Distinguished Service, awarded each year for "exceptional service to the classics in New England." It is named for Claude Barlow and Goodwin Beach. Barlow (d. 1976) was a long-time officer of CANE, including ten years as secretary-treasurer. He was professor of classics at Mount Holyoke College and, later, at Clark University. Beach (d. 1976), though not originally a classicist by profession, was a dedicated Latinist who became a teacher after retiring from a career in business. He presented papers on both ancient Latin and neo-Latin at annual meetings over some thirty years and was instrumental in establishing an endowment for CANE.

== Bibliography ==
Z. Philip Ambrose. "Re-reading the Classicists: The First Meeting of the Classical Association of New England, April 6–7, 1906." NECJ 33.1 (Feb. 2006), 1–8.

Allan D. Wooley and Z. Philip Ambrose. CANE's Centennial History: A 100-Year Retrospective. Classical Association of New England, 2006.
