= James Monroe Taylor =

President of Vassar College and Baptist minister (1848–1916)

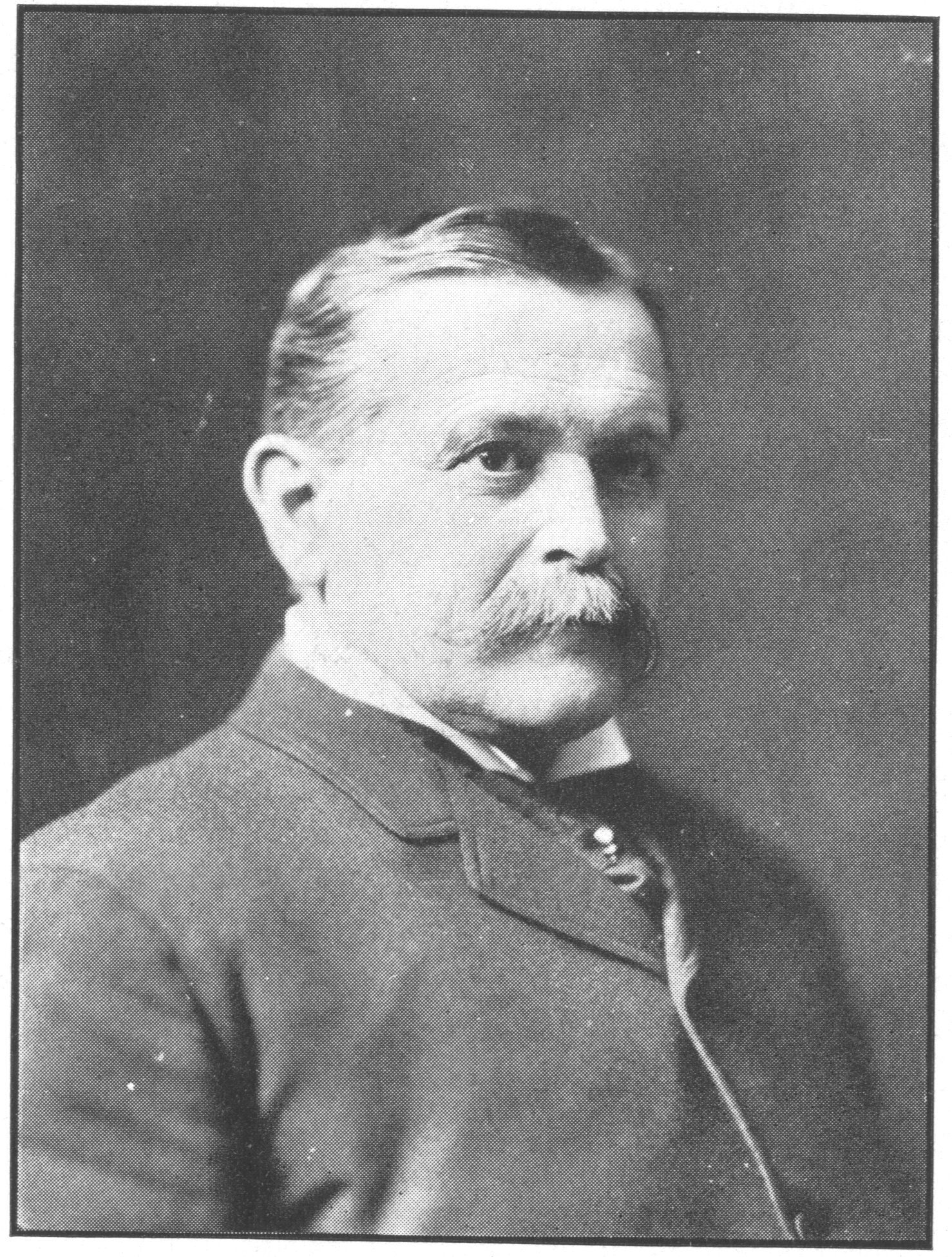

4th President of Vassar College
- In office 1886–1914
- Preceded by: Samuel L. Caldwell
- Succeeded by: Henry Noble MacCracken

Personal details
- Born: August 5, 1848 Brooklyn, New York
- Died: December 19, 1916 (aged 68) New York, New York
- Spouse: Kate Huntington
- Children: 4
- Occupation: Minister

James Monroe Taylor (August 5, 1848 – December 19, 1916) was a Baptist minister who was the fourth president of Vassar College.

== Education and career ==
Born in Brooklyn, New York on August 5, 1848, he was educated at the University of Rochester, from which he graduated in 1868. He went on to study at Rochester Theological Seminary, becoming ordained as a Baptist minister in 1871. He toured Europe in 1873, and then spent 16 years working as a minister around Rhode Island and Connecticut.

Taylor became the president of Vassar College in 1886, and remained in the position until 1914.

== Personal life ==
Taylor married Kate Huntington in the 1870s. The couple had four children. Taylor died of pneumonia in New York City on December 19, 1916, only two years after retiring from Vassar.
