= Cornelia C. Coulter =

American classicist and academic

Cornelia Coulter
- Born: 1885; Ferguson, Missouri, U.S.
- Died: 27 April 1960 (aged 74–75); Newport News, Virginia, U.S.

Academic background
- Education: Washington University in St. Louis (BA); Bryn Mawr College (PhD)
- Thesis: Retratio in the Ambrosian and Palatine Recensions of Plautus: A Study of the Persia, Poenulus, Pseudolus, Stichlus, and Trinummus

Academic work
- Discipline: Classics
- Sub-discipline: Latin literature
- Institutions: Bryn Mawr College; Vassar College; Mount Holyoke College

Cornelia Catlin Coulter (1885 – 27 April 1960) was an American classicist and academic who was professor of Latin at Mount Holyoke College from 1926 to 1951. She is known in particular for her work on the Medieval and Renaissance use of Classical sources and for her presidency of and advocacy for the Classical Association of New England.

== Career ==
Coulter was born in 1885 in Ferguson, Missouri and was the daughter of a Presbyterian minister, the Rev. Joseph Hill Coulter.

Coulter gained her BA from Washington University in St. Louis in 1907 and her Ph.D. from Bryn Mawr College in 1911. From 1909 to 1910, Coulter spent a year studying at the Ludwig-Maximilians-Universität München. Coulter's PhD dissertation, Retractatio in the Ambrosian and Palatine Recensions of Plautus: A Study of the Persa, Poenulus, Pseudolus, Stichus and Trinummus, was published as a Bryn Mawr College Monograph in 1911.

After her PhD, Coulter became Reader of Latin at Bryn Mawr College. From 1912 to 1914 she taught Latin and Greek at Saint Agnes School in New York. Coulter became Associate Professor of Latin and Greek at Vassar College in 1916 and moved to Mount Holyoke College in 1926, where she remained till her retirement in 1951. In 1927, Coulter became a member of the American Association of University Professors. At Mount Holyoke College, Coulter was a professor of Latin and chairman of the department from 1935 to 1948.

After her retirement from Mount Holyoke College, Coulter taught for two years at Hiram College from 1951 to 1953 as a visiting professor for the John Hay Whitney Foundation. Following this, Coulter returned to brief periods of teaching at Mount Holyoke College for a semester in 1957 and at the University of North Carolina at Chapel Hill in 1959.

Coulter's work on the reception of classical authors in Medieval and Renaissance scholarship returned repeatedly throughout her career and retirement to the use of classical sources in the work of Boccaccio and this work is still in use today in assessing Boccaccio's sources.

Coulter served as president of the Classical Association of New England, the American Philological Association, and the Western Massachusetts Society of the Archaeological Institute of America.

== Legacy ==
Coulter's work for the Classical Association of New England had particular impact and she was described in 1961 by Prof. Claude W. Barlow as 'in many ways the greatest single benefactress that the Classical Association of New England has ever had'. Coulter had joined the Association in 1927 and became a life member in 1953. She was vice-president from 1942 until 1943, and president from 1947 until 1948. Coulter also served as an officer and on a number of committees for the Association during her membership but she had the most impact in fundraising for the Association. Alongside this activity, in 1946 Coulter became the Chair of a special committee for summer scholarships to the American School of Classical Studies in Rome. Coulter was the largest single contributor to the Association's Rome Scholarship Fund, and for a number of years anonymously supplied the full funds for the annual awards. In 1961, the Classical Association of New England renamed the Rome Scholarship the Cornelia Catlin Coulter Rome Scholarship.

Coulter was widely regarded as an excellent teacher who devoted her career to supporting the classics, students, and colleagues:

Brilliant as was her scholarship, effective and skillful as was her administration, it was perhaps as a teacher that her greatness was most widely and keenly felt, for hers was a life dominated above all by giving to others. To her teaching and to her students, both in and out of class, and to her colleagues she gave continuously and unstintingly of her own amazing store of knowledge, her penetrating understanding of classical ideas and ideals, her sense of style, and above all her own personality, fearless and determined in her support of the classics and any cause of right and justice, yet gentle, modest and unselfishly self-effacing to a degree rarely encountered.

— Lucy T. Shoe (Cornelia C. Coulter Obituary, ACSA Annual Report 1960)

The Cornelia Catlin Coulter papers are held in the Mount Holyoke College Archives including correspondence, poetry, and Coulter's PhD dissertation submitted to Bryn Mawr College in 1911.

A manuscript typed by Coulter on the "History of Town of Ferguson, 1845-1911" is held among the Coulter Family Papers in the Missouri Historical Society, St. Louis.

== Selected publications ==
- 'Statius, Silvae, V, 4 and Fiammetta's Prayer to Sleep' in The American Journal of Philology Vol. 80, No. 4 (1959), pp. 390–395
- 'Boccaccio's Knowledge of Quintilian' in Speculum Vol. 33, No. 4 (Oct., 1958), pp. 490–496
- 'Pollio's History of the Civil War' in The Classical Weekly Vol. 46, No. 3 (Dec. 1, 1952), pp. 33–36
- 'The Transfiguration of the Sibyl' in The Classical Journal Vol. 46, No. 3 (Dec., 1950), pp. 121–126
- 'Boccaccio and the Cassinese Manuscripts of the Laurentian Library' in Classical Philology Vol. 43, No. 4 (Oct., 1948), pp. 217–230
- 'The Library of the Angevin Kings at Naples' in Transactions and Proceedings of the American Philological Association Vol. 75 (1944), pp. 141–155
- 'Marcus Junius Brutus and the "Brutus" of Accius' in The Classical Journal Vol. 35, No. 8 (May, 1940), pp. 460–470
- 'Further Notes on the Ritual of the Bithynian Christians' in Classical Philology Vol. 35, No. 1 (Jan., 1940), pp. 60–63
- 'Boccaccio's Archaeological Knowledge' in American Journal of Archaeology Vol. 41, No. 3 (Jul. - Sep., 1937), pp. 397–405
- 'Aeolian Strains on the Roman Lyre' in The Classical Journal Vol. 31, No. 3 (Dec., 1935), pp. 175–182
- 'Boccaccio's Acquaintance with Homer' in Philological Quarterly (January 1926)
- 'The Happy Otherworld and Fairy Mistress Themes in the Odyssey' in Transactions and Proceedings of the American Philological Association Vol. 56 (1925), pp. 37–53
- 'Latin Hymns of the Middle Ages' in Studies in Philology Vol. 21, No. 4 (Oct., 1924), pp. 571–585
- 'The Genealogy of the Gods' in Vassar Medieval Studies (Yale University Press, 1923) pp. 336–40
- 'The Plautine Tradition in Shakespeare' in The Journal of English and Germanic Philology Vol. 19, No. 1 (Jan., 1920), pp. 66–83
- Compound adjectives in early Latin poetry (Ginn & Company, Boston, 1916)
- Retractatio in the Ambrosian and Palatine Recensions of Plautus. A Study of the Persa, Poenulus, Pseudolus, Stichus and Trinummus (Bryn Mawr College Monographs: Monograph Series, vol. X. 1911)
