= Ward W. Briggs =

American historian

Ward W. Briggs Jr. (born November 26, 1945, in Riverside, California) is an American classicist and historian of classical studies. He taught until 2011 as the Carolina Distinguished Professor of Classics and Louise Fry Scudder Professor of Humanities at the University of South Carolina.

== Education and career ==
Briggs studied at the University of North Carolina at Chapel Hill, where he wrote his M.A. thesis on Horace and his Ph.D. thesis, under the supervision of Brooks Otis, on Virgil.

His research interests include Roman poetry and the history of classical studies in North America. He is the editor, co-editor, and author of several standard works in his field. He published, among other items, a biography of Basil Lanneau Gildersleeve, the founder of modern American study of classical antiquity.

== Selected works ==
- Aspects of Horace, Odes 3.19. Chapel Hill 1969
- Repetitions from Virgil’s Georgics in the Aeneid. Chapel Hill 1974
- Narrative and Simile from the Georgics in the Aeneid. Leiden 1980 (Mnemosyne Supplements 58)

As editor

- Concordantia in Varronis Libros de re rustica. Hildesheim 1983
- with Herbert W. Benario: Basil Lanneau Gildersleeve: An American Classicist. Baltimore 1986
- with Herbert W. Benario: The Letters of Basil Lanneau Gildersleeve. Baltimore 1987. ISBN 978-0801828768
- with William M. Calder III: Classical Scholarship: A Biographical Encyclopedia. New York/London 1990. ISBN 978-0824084486
- The Selected Classical Papers of Basil Lanneau Gildersleeve. Atlanta 1992
- Biographical Dictionary of North American Classicists. Westport (Connecticut)/London 1994. ISBN 0-313-24560-6
- with E. Christian Kopff: The Roosevelt lectures of Paul Shorey (1913–1914). Hildesheim/Zürich/New York 1995. ISBN 3-487-09982-9
- Soldier and scholar: Basil Lanneau Gildersleeve and the Civil War. Charlottesville 1998
