= L. D. Reynolds =

British classicist (1930–1999)

L. D. Reynolds FBA
- Born: Leighton Durham Reynolds; 11 February 1930; Abercanaid, Merthyr Tydfil, Wales
- Died: 4 December 1999 (aged 69); Oxford, England
- Spouse: Susan Buchanan (m. 1962)

Academic background
- Education: University College Cardiff; St John's College, Cambridge
- Influences: R. A. B. Mynors; Neil Ripley Ker; Richard William Hunt

Academic work
- Discipline: Classics
- Sub-discipline: Textual criticism
- Institutions: Brasenose College, Oxford

Leighton Durham Reynolds FBA (11 February 1930 – 4 December 1999) was a British Latinist who was known for his work on textual criticism. Spending his entire teaching career at Brasenose College, Oxford, he prepared the most commonly cited edition of Seneca the Younger's Letters.

The central academic achievement of Reynolds's career was his monograph The Medieval Tradition of Seneca's Letters (1965), in which he reconstructed how the text was transmitted through the Middle Ages (Note: Transmission refers to the ways in which classical texts were circulated and preserved prior to the invention of printing.) and revealed that most of the younger manuscripts were of little use for the establishment of the text. He also produced critical editions of Seneca's Dialogues, the works of the historian Sallust, and Cicero's De finibus bonorum et malorum. In 1968, Reynolds and his Oxford colleague Nigel Guy Wilson co-authored Scribes and Scholars: A Guide to the Transmission of Greek and Latin Literature, a well-received introduction to textual criticism.

Writing about the set of critical editions authored by Reynolds, the Latinist Michael Reeve stated that Reynolds's scholarship had the ability "to cut through dozens of manuscripts to the serviceable core". At the time of its publication, his work on Seneca was considered by some commentators to be difficult to surpass.

== Early life and education ==
Leighton Durham Reynolds was born on 11 February 1930 in the Welsh village of Abercanaid, south of Merthyr Tydfil. His father, Edgar Reynolds, was a civil servant working as a national health insurance clerk. The family of his mother, Hester Hale, had moved to Wales from the English county of Somerset in the previous generation. William Hale, his maternal grandfather, exerted a strong influence on Reynolds during his childhood; a coal miner by profession, he shared with Reynolds a passion for gardening, leading his grandson to join a society for natural history in Cardiff. Supported by the naturalists Bruce Campbell and A. E. Wade, he wrote his first publications on the birds of the Caerphilly Basin.

Reynolds attended Caerphilly Grammar School and won a scholarship to study Modern languages at The Queen's College, Oxford. Due to a short-lived regulation stipulating that holders of state scholarships attend the institution nearest to their hometown, he did not take up his place, enrolling instead at University College Cardiff in 1947. Reynolds initially focused on French and Italian and spent some time at the Università per Stranieri di Perugia in Italy. Influenced by the Latinist R. G. Austin, he increasingly turned to the study of Latin, culminating in the award of a first-class degree in 1950.

With Austin's support, Reynolds went on to obtain a scholarship for a second undergraduate degree at St John's College, Cambridge. He completed the Classical Tripos, the Classics degree offered by the University of Cambridge, in two years instead of the usual three and received several awards for his performance, including a Craven Fellowship from the university. At St John's, he made the acquaintance of Bryan Peter Reardon, an expert on Ancient Greek novels, the Plato scholar Michael Stokes, and the Latinist John Patrick Sullivan. In 1952, after travelling to Greece, Reynolds began his national service at the Royal Air Force, where most of his time was spent studying Russian in a programme introduced by the linguist Elizabeth Hill. After completing the course, he lodged with a Russian émigré in Paris to improve his fluency in spoken Russian. He left the air force after two years with the rank of pilot officer.

== Career at Oxford ==
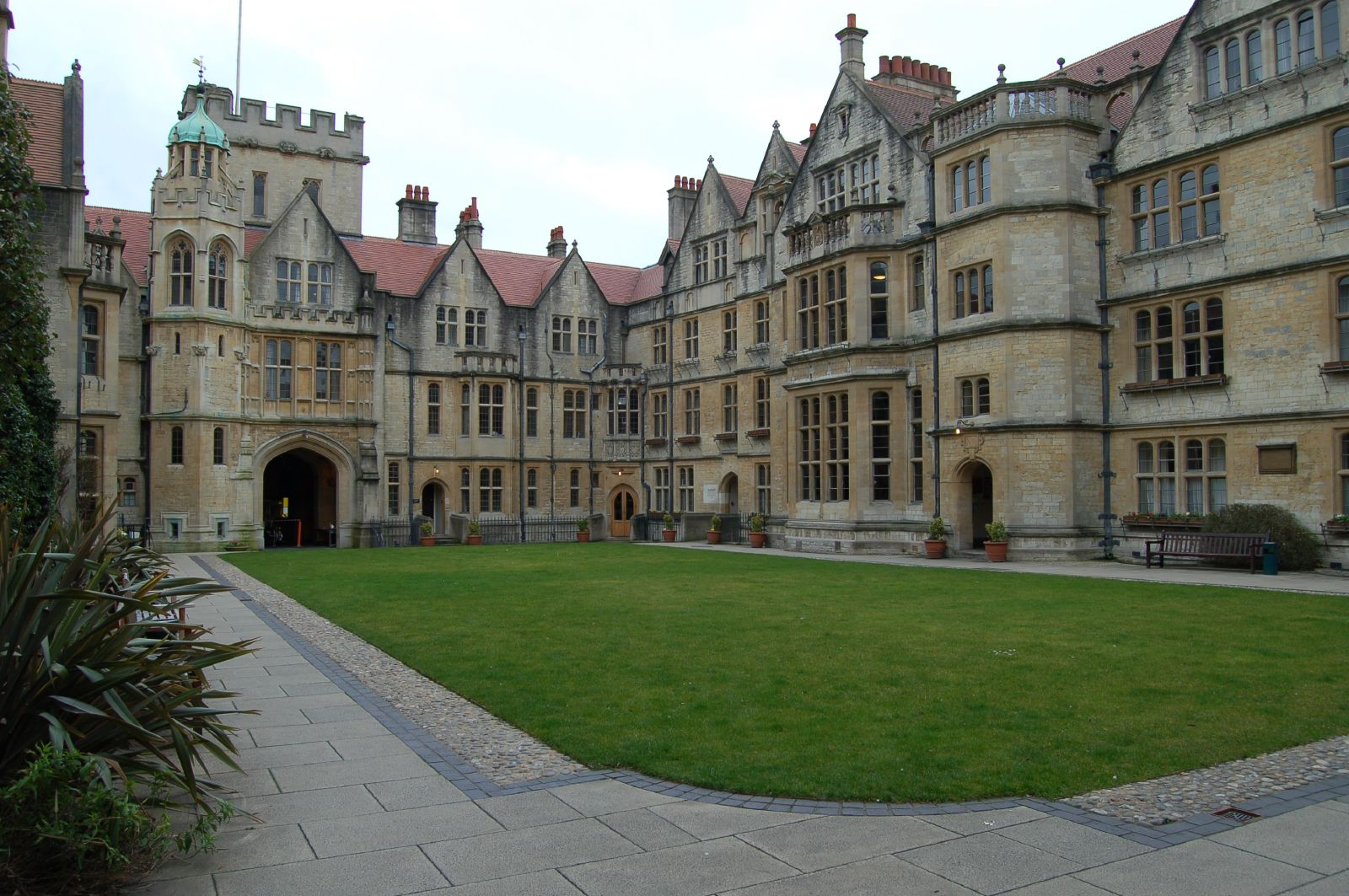
Brasenose College, Oxford, where Reynolds served as a fellow and tutor in Classics from 1957 to 1996

In 1954, Reynolds was elected to his first academic appointment, a research fellowship at The Queen's College, Oxford. During his three years there, he worked mainly on the Letters of Seneca the Younger, which would later form the basis of his reputation as a Latinist. In this period, he came under the influence of three textual critics working at Oxford: Neil Ripley Ker, Richard William Hunt, and R. A. B. Mynors, the senior chair of Latin at the university. They encouraged him to study the transmission of the text of Seneca.

The post of Classics tutor at Brasenose College, Oxford, had fallen vacant after its incumbent, Maurice Platnauer, had become the college's new Principal. In 1957, after the end of his research fellowship, Reynolds was selected as Platnauer's replacement and duly elected to a tutorial fellowship. He was also appointed a University Lecturer in Greek and Latin Literature. He held both appointments for the rest of his academic career. Reynolds played an active part in the college's governing body, where, according to the Brasenose fellow and chemist Graham Richards, he "held a position of quiet authority". From 1985 to 1987, he served as Vice-Principal and, in 1997, as acting Principal of the college. He supported Brasenose's decision to become the first all-male college of the university to admit female students. In 1996 he was raised to the rank of a professor.

In 1962, he married Susan Mary Buchanan, an optometrist and daughter of the Scottish town planner Colin Buchanan. Their wedding reception was held at Brasenose College, where Reynolds was jokingly given an exeat, a permission required by undergraduates to spend a night away from the college, by a student. They moved into Winterslow Cottage in the hamlet of Boars Hill near Oxford, which they later bought from the college. Reynolds and his wife had two daughters and a son.

Reynolds was elected a Fellow of the British Academy in 1987. Over the course of his career, he held a number of visiting fellowships and professorships; he spent periods at the University of Texas at Austin, the Institute for Advanced Study at Princeton (twice), and at Cornell University (twice). From 1975 to 1987, he was co-editor of The Classical Review.

== Retirement and death ==
Reynolds retired from his teaching duties in 1997, one year after being appointed to a professorship. Around this time, he was diagnosed with cancer. In an obituary in the Proceedings of the British Academy, the Latinist Michael Winterbottom wrote that Reynolds underwent oncological surgery in 1995 and was later treated at Churchill Hospital, Oxford. According to the Hellenist Nigel Guy Wilson, the diagnosis was made only in 1999 with Reynolds opting for palliative treatment. He died on 4 December 1999 in Oxford.

== Contributions to scholarship ==
=== Seneca's Letters ===
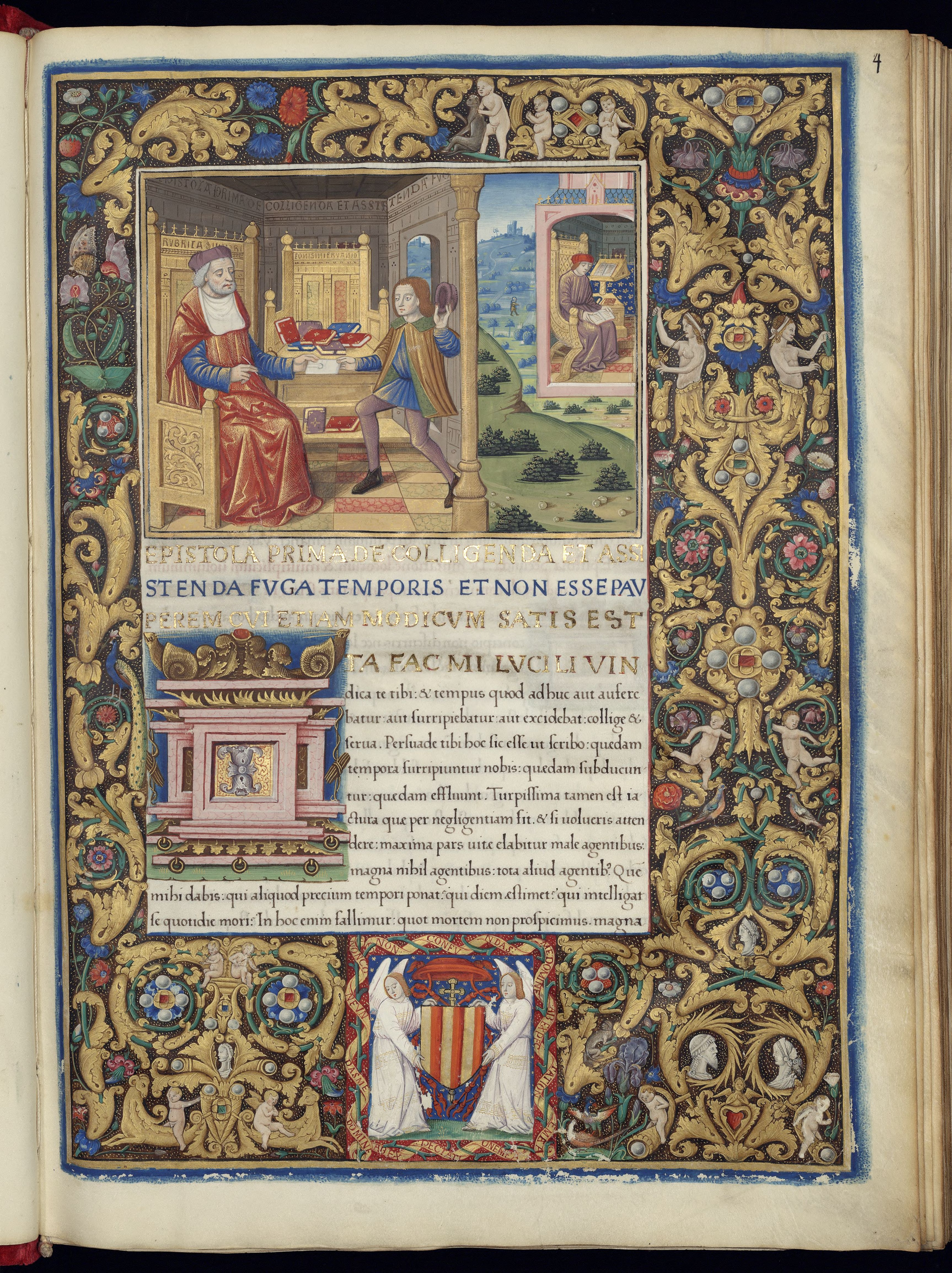
The beginning of Letter 1 from Seneca the Younger's Letters in a manuscript illuminated by Robert Boyvin (c. 1500)

In the application for his position at Brasenose, Reynolds wrote that he had been working on the textual transmission of Seneca the Younger's Letters, and that he aimed to publish a new critical edition of the text together with a general survey of the topic. While conducting this research, he had travelled extensively in Europe to study the relevant manuscripts. In 1965, he published the results of his work: an edition of the Letters in the Oxford Classical Texts series and a monograph entitled The Medieval Tradition of Seneca's Letters.

Reynolds set out to answer two central questions regarding the medieval manuscripts of the Letters: how authoritative are the 'younger' manuscripts, written after the 12th century, in establishing the text, and how do they relate to the older segment of the tradition? For Letters 1–88, which were transmitted separately, he elaborated the stemma introduced by the German philologist Otto Foerster. Reynolds established a transmission in three distinct branches (p, α, γ) (Note: In textual criticism, Greek letters denote reconstructed manuscript families. Letters of the Latin alphabet commonly refer to manuscripts whose existence is certain.) in which α and γ characteristically offer common readings. He demonstrated more thoroughly than his predecessor how the younger manuscripts descended through the γ branch. This breakthrough in particular is described by the classicist Gregor Maurach as the result of time-consuming scholarly groundwork.

The transmission of Letters 89–124 depends on a much narrower manuscript base which he sought to supplement. Previously, three individual manuscripts had been considered the key textual witnesses (B, Q, p); Reynolds showed that p and Q were in fact representatives of larger groups of manuscripts comprising several more recent manuscripts. This part of his research drew praise from reviewers, with the classicist B. L. Hijmans commenting that its method of reconstruction would "be very useful in seminars on textual criticism". Reynolds's concluding remarks about the younger manuscripts stated that, with few exceptions, "they have no contribution to make to the reconstruction of the text". Writing for The Classical Review, the Latinist E. J. Kenney said that this conclusion was "an altogether Herculean feat" but added that it "hardly prepare[d]" readers for the large role these manuscripts played in editions of the Letters.

Appearing in two volumes, Reynolds's edition of the Letters was based on the results of his monograph. For Kenney, the edition displayed "almost constantly sound" judgement of textual problems and had a critical apparatus without "serious inconsistencies". Although he criticised a number of editorial aspects, he concluded by writing that "[Reynolds's] edition will surely be for a long time to come the standard text of this undervalued work". Hijmans expressed a similar opinion while stating that Reynolds's work may not have provided the final assessment of all available manuscripts.

=== Further critical editions ===
In 1977, Reynolds published a critical edition of Seneca's Dialogues. Having identified the Codex Ambrosianus (A) as the most important source of the text, he relied heavily on it and drew on the readings of younger manuscripts only where A showed signs of corruption. (Note: Corruption occurs when the original wording of a text has been altered in the process of transmission.) For Latinist D. R. Shackleton Bailey, the result was a text which surpassed that published in 1905 by the German scholar Emil Hermes. Shackleton Bailey further stated that "it seems unlikely that [Reynolds's text] can ever be greatly bettered". According to the reviewer Daniel Knecht, Reynolds was more willing than previous editors to posit cruces in places where the text was irremediably corrupt and to delete passages he considered inauthentic.

Reynolds continued his work on Latin prose authors in 1991 with an edition of the collected works of the Roman historian Sallust. At that time, the standard text had been a 1954 edition by Alfons Kurfess in the Bibliotheca Teubneriana series. Reynolds innovated by limiting himself to reporting five manuscripts in passages where Kurfess had provided unnecessary detail. For Stephen Oakley, the Kennedy Professor of Latin at Cambridge, the greatest merit of the edition was its judicious provision of readings from less reliable manuscripts, which has led to the solution of a difficult textual problem in chapter 114 of Sallust's Jugurtha. The classicist Stephen Shierling considered the differences between the editions of Kurfess and Reynolds of "modest importance" but said the new text was "cleaner and more consistent".

Published in 1998, the final critical edition of his career covered Cicero's philosophical text De finibus bonorum et malorum. This work had been edited competently by the Danish classical scholar Johan Nicolai Madvig in 1839 but technological and methodological advances had necessitated a new rendition of the text. Reynolds remodelled the stemma by defining two principal transmission groups (α and φ) to which all available manuscripts belong. In addition to a concise critical apparatus, he fitted the text with a secondary apparatus providing background information on the philosophical concepts discussed.

=== Scribes and Scholars ===
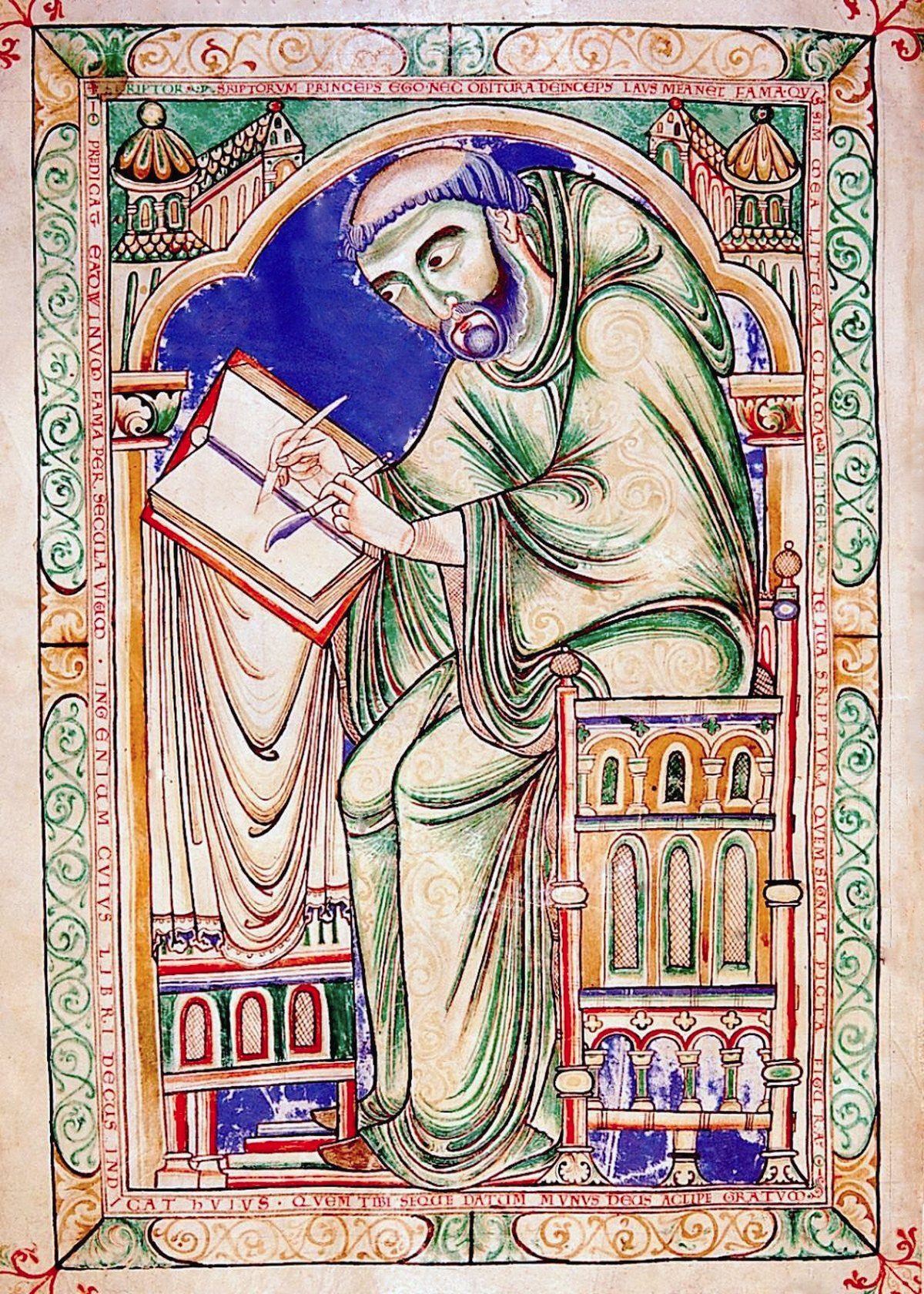
Reynolds and Wilson co-authored a book on the medieval transmission of classical texts. This anonymous picture from the 12th-century shows a scribe at his desk and is housed at Trinity College, Cambridge.

After publishing his work on Seneca's Letters, Reynolds collaborated with Nigel Guy Wilson, a Hellenist and fellow of the neighbouring Lincoln College, to produce a general introduction to the transmission of classical texts. They were tasked with this endeavour after Oxford University Press had been made aware of the need for such a book. Their joint volume was published in 1968 as Scribes and Scholars: A Guide to the Transmission of Greek and Latin Literature. The book appeared in two further editions (1974 and 1991) and was translated into Italian, French, Greek, Spanish, and Japanese. The book contained chapters on the afterlife of classical texts in antiquity, the Middle Ages, and the Renaissance; the last chapter discussed modern textual criticism.

Scribes and Scholars was met with enthusiastic reviews from the scholarly world. The Hellenist Patricia Easterling considered it to have achieved its aim of providing a general introduction with "striking success". She commented that the book had "one serious drawback: its scholarship is so good that more advanced students will also want to use it, and for them it will be frustrating to find that there are no footnotes". The philologist Conor Fahy termed it an "excellent short manual" though he criticised the authors' assertion that Greek was the only language spoken in Southern Italy and Sicily during the Middle Ages. For the reviewer Wolfgang Hörmann, the book constituted "a work of art in its own way" (German: in seiner Art ein kleines Kunstwerk). Commenting on the final chapter on modern textual criticism, he praised Reynolds and Wilson for avoiding the common pitfall of forcing the discipline into a rigid methodological system.

== Legacy ==
Reynolds's reputation as a scholar rests on his contributions to textual criticism. In an obituary for The Independent, the Latinist Michael Reeve wrote that Reynolds's scholarship had the ability "to cut through dozens of manuscripts to the serviceable core". Scribes and Scholars, the introduction to textual criticism co-authored with Wilson, was described by Reeve as "the kind of book that one simply cannot imagine not being there". Even though his scholarship on Seneca was at the time of its publication considered by some commentators to be insurpassable, Winterbottom considers the transmission of the Letters much more open than Reynolds envisaged. As of 2001, his text was nonetheless still consulted as the standard edition. Writing in 2019 for the bibliographical repository Oxford Bibliographies Online, the Seneca scholars Ermanno Malaspina, Jula Wildberger, and Veronica Revello named Reynolds's editions as "the best and most cited" texts of Seneca's works.

== Publications ==
The following monographs and editions were written by Reynolds:

- Reynolds, L. D. (1965). L. Annaei Senecae Ad Lucilium Epistulae Morales. 2 Volumes. Oxford: Oxford University Press OCLC 70458249
- — (1965). The Medieval Tradition of Seneca's Letters. Oxford: Oxford University Press. OCLC 901949196.
- — (1968). Nigel Guy Wilson (ed.). Scribes and Scholars: A Guide to the Transmission of Greek and Latin Literature. Oxford: Oxford University Press. OCLC 164411390.
- — (1977). L. Annaei Senecae Dialogorum Libri Duodecim. Oxford: Oxford University Press. ISBN 978-0-19-814659-9.
- — (1983). L. D. Reynolds (ed.). Texts and Transmission: a Survey of the Latin Classics. Oxford: Clarendon Press. ISBN 978-0-19-814456-4.
- — (1991). Catilina, Iugurtha, Historiarum Fragmenta Selecta C. Sallusti Crispi. Appendix Sallustiana. Oxford: Oxford University Press. ISBN 978-0-19-814667-4.
- — (1998). M. Tulli Ciceronis De Finibus Bonorum et Malorum Libri Quinque. Oxford: Oxford University Press. ISBN 978-0-19-814670-4.

Reynolds also published the following articles or chapters:

- Reynolds, L. D. (March 1955). "The Flowering Plants and Pteridophyta of the Caerphilly Basin". The North Western Naturalist. New Series. 3: 35–57.
- — (1957). "Two Notes on the Manuscripts of Seneca's Letters". The Classical Review. 7 (1): 5–12. doi:10.1017/S0009840X00162948. JSTOR 705997. S2CID 162206772.
- — (1968). "The Medieval Tradition of Seneca's Dialogues". The Classical Quarterly. New Series. 18 (2): 355–372. doi:10.1017/S0009838800022187. JSTOR 638078. S2CID 162946690.
- — (1974). "Some Notes on the Text of Seneca's Dialogues". The Classical Quarterly. New Series. 24 (2): 269–275. doi:10.1017/S0009838800032808. JSTOR 638488. S2CID 170861272.
- — (1984–1985). "The Lacuna in Sallust's Jugurtha". Revue d'Histoire des Textes. 14–15: 59–69.
- — (1992). "The Transmission of the 'De Finibus'". Italia Medioevale e Umanistica. 35: 1–30.
- — (1995). "Petrarch and a Renaissance Corpus of Cicero's Philosophica". In Pecere, Oronzo; Reeve, Michael D. (eds.). Formative Stages of Classical Traditions: Latin Texts from Antiquity to the Renaissance: Proceedings of a Conference held at Erice, 16–22 October 1993. Spoleto: Centro Italiano di Studi sull'Alto Medioevo. pp. 409–433. ISBN 978-88-7988-449-5.
- — (2000). "Petrarch and Cicero's Philosophical Works". Les Cahiers de l'Humanisme. 1: 37–52.
- — (2000). "Beatus Rhenanus and Seneca, De Beneficiis and De Clementia". In Hirstein, James (ed.). Beatus Rhenanus: Lecteur et Éditeur des Textes Anciens: Actes du Colloque International tenu a Strasbourg et a Sélestat du 13 au 15 Novembre 1998. Turnhout: Brepols. pp. 101–115. ISBN 978-2-503-51120-7.
- — (2001). "Experiences of an Editor of Classical Latin Texts". Revue d'Histoire des Textes. 30 (2000): 1–15. doi:10.3406/rht.2001.1487.

== Bibliography ==
- De Nonno, Mario (2010). "Transmission and Textual Criticism". In Barchiesi, Alessandro; Scheidel, Walter (eds.). The Oxford Handbook of Roman Studies. Oxford: Oxford University Press. pp. 31–48. doi:10.1093/oxfordhb/9780199211524.013.0003. ISBN 978-0-19-921152-4.
- Dyck, Andrew (2000). "Review of M. Tulli Ciceronis de Finibus Bonorum et Malorum Libri Quinque by L. D. Reynolds". Bryn Mawr Classical Review. ISSN 1055-7660. Archived from the original on 11 August 2021.
- Easterling, Patricia (1970). "Review of Scribes and Scholars: a Guide to the Transmission of Greek and Latin Literature by L. D. Reynolds and N. G. Wilson". The Journal of Hellenic Studies. 90: 237. doi:10.2307/629798. ISSN 0075-4269. JSTOR 629798. S2CID 163375602.
- Fahy, Conor (1970). "Review of Scribes and Scholars: A Guide to the Transmission of Greek and Latin Literature by L. D. Reynolds and N. G. Wilson". The English Historical Review. 85: 150–151. ISSN 0013-8266. JSTOR 563072.
- Hijmans, B. L. (1968). "Review of The Medieval Tradition of Seneca's Letters and L. Annaei Senecae Ad Lucilium Epistulae Morales by L. D. Reynolds". Mnemosyne. 21: 322–326. ISSN 0026-7074. JSTOR 4429658.
- Hörmann, Wolfgang (1970). "Review of Scribes and Scholars: A Guide to the Transmission of Greek and Latin Literature". Gymnasium (in German). 77: 258–259. ISSN 0342-5231.
- Kenney, E. J. (1966). "Seneca's Epistulae Morales". The Classical Review. 16: 340–344. doi:10.1017/S0009840X00322193. ISSN 0009-840X. S2CID 246881049.
- Knecht, Daniel (1978). "Review of L. Annaei Senecae Dialogorum libri XIII". L'Antiquité Classique (in French). 47: 646–647. ISSN 0770-2817. JSTOR 41651371.
- Malaspina, Ermanno; Wildberger, Jula; Revello, Veronica (3 June 2019). "Seneca". Oxford Bibliographies Online. doi:10.1093/obo/9780195396577-0264. ISBN 978-0-19-539657-7.
- Maurach, Gregor (1968). "Review of The Medieval Tradition of Seneca's Letters by L. D. Reynolds". Gnomon (in German). 40: 158–163. ISSN 0017-1417. JSTOR 27684391.
- Oakley, Stephen (1993). "The Oxford Text of Sallust". The Classical Review. 43: 58–61. doi:10.1017/S0009840X00285776. ISSN 0009-840X. S2CID 162939525.
- Reeve, Michael (16 December 1999). "Obituary: Professor Leighton Reynolds". The Independent. ISSN 0951-9467. Archived from the original on 5 March 2016.
- Reynolds, Leighton Durham (1965). The Medieval Tradition of Seneca's Letters. Oxford: Oxford University Press. OCLC 887802865.
- Reynolds, Leigthon Durham; Wilson, Nigel Guy (1968). Scribes and Scholars: A Guide to the Transmission of Greek and Latin Literature. Oxford: Oxford University Press. OCLC 164411390.
- Schierling, Stephen (1994). "Studies in Sallust". The Classical Journal. 90 (1): 96–101. ISSN 0009-8353. JSTOR 3297823.
- Shackleton Bailey, D. R. (1979). "Review of L. Annaei Senecae "Dialogorum" libri duodecim by L. D. Reynolds". Classical Philology. 74: 76–78. doi:10.1086/366477. ISSN 0009-837X. JSTOR 268271.
- Wilson, N. G. (2004). "Reynolds, Leighton Durham (1930–1999)". In Cannadine, David (ed.). Oxford Dictionary of National Biography (online ed.). Oxford University Press. doi:10.1093/ref:odnb/73567. (Subscription, Wikipedia Library access or UK public library membership required.)
- Winterbottom, Michael (2001). "Leighton Durham Reynolds 1930–1999" (PDF). Proceedings of the British Academy. 111: 659–676. ISSN 0068-1202. Archived (PDF) from the original on 19 July 2021.
