= Correspondence of Paul and Seneca =

Forged letters

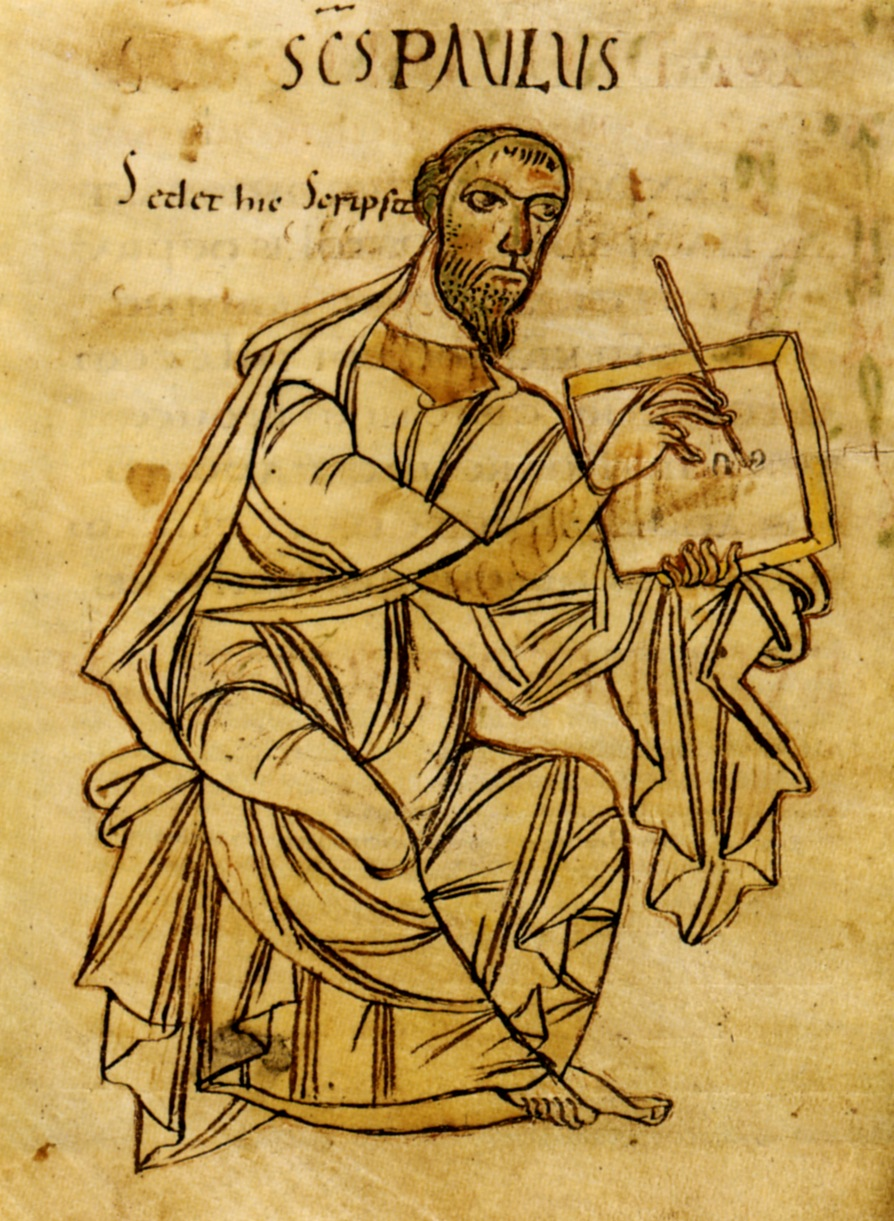
Art depicting Saint Paul in a 9th-century manuscript from the Abbey of Saint Gall.

The Correspondence of (or between) Paul and Seneca, also known as the Letters of Paul and Seneca or Epistle to Seneca the Younger, is a collection of letters claiming to be between Paul the Apostle and Seneca the Younger. There are 8 epistles from Seneca, and 6 replies from Paul. They were purportedly authored from 58–64 CE during the reign of Roman Emperor Nero, but appear to have actually been written in the middle of the fourth century (c. 320–380 CE). Until the Renaissance, the epistles were seen as genuine, but scholars began to critically examine them in the 15th century, and today they are held to be inauthentic forgeries.

== Summary and background ==
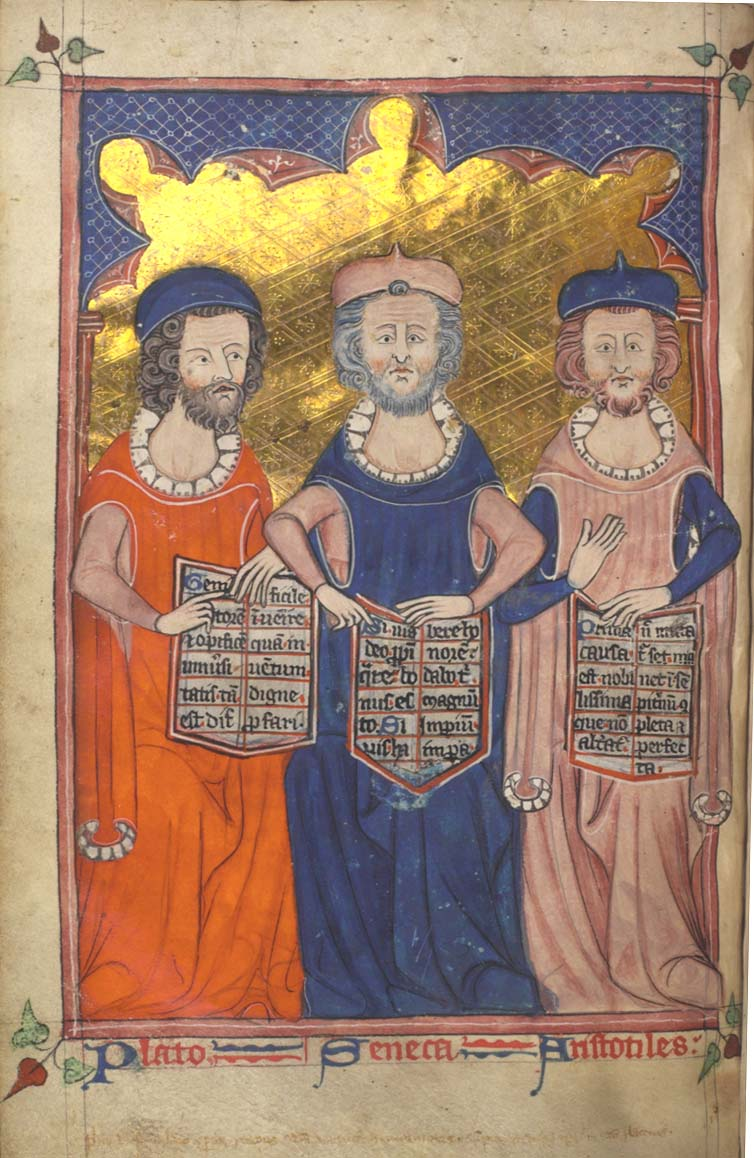
A 14th-century English depiction of three classical philosophers held in high esteem in the medieval era: Plato, Seneca, and Aristotle. Seneca's reputation was partially linked to his apocryphal friendship with Paul.

Paul of Tarsus was an early Christian theologian and evangelist, who wrote epistles to Christian communities and founded multiple churches across the Greek-speaking Eastern Mediterranean region. Seneca the Younger was one of the foremost philosophers of Stoicism, a teacher and adviser to Emperor Nero, a dramatist, and a Roman government official. The correspondence between them comprises fourteen letters in total (8 from Seneca, 6 from Paul) and is written in Latin. It has little substantive content. It largely consists of the two praising each other; Seneca lavishes flattery on Paul, while Paul responds in kind. For example, the first epistle from Seneca states that "[Paul's works] are so lofty and so brilliant with noble sentiments that in my opinion generations of men could hardly be enough to become established and perfected in them. I wish you good health, brother." Essentially, the main interest of these letters is that they exist at all: they ostensibly demonstrate that Paul was important and respected enough to trade letters with the eminent philosopher Seneca, that Seneca was wise enough to understand Paul's greatness despite being a pagan, and that the two were friends.

Many, but not all, surviving manuscripts include dates on some of the letters of the correspondence. The earliest of these is "27 June in the consulship of Nero III and Messala" (58 CE) and the latest is "28 March in the consulship of Frugi and Bassus" (64 CE). The one epistle that does include substantive content is the 11th one dated 64 CE, which directly discusses the Great Fire of Rome.

== Reception in the late Roman Empire and the Middle Ages ==
The earliest known reference to them is in Jerome's On Illustrious Men chapter 12, a work of around 392 CE:

Lucius Annaeus Seneca of Cordova, a disciple of the Stoic Sotion, and paternal uncle of the poet Lucan, was a man of very temperate life whom I would not place in a catalogue of saints, were it not that I was prompted to do so by those Letters from Paul to Seneca and from Seneca to Paul which are very widely read. In these, when Seneca was Nero's teacher and the most influential person of the period, he said that he wished to have the same position among his own [i.e., the pagans] which Paul had among the Christians. Two years before Peter and Paul were crowned with martyrdom, he was put to death by Nero.

— Jerome, De Viris Illustribus (On Illustrious Men)

Augustine of Hippo also briefly mentions the correspondence, as does Pseudo-Linus. During the late fourth and fifth century, such a correspondence was both plausible and interesting to educated Roman Christians. The Acts of the Apostles claims that Paul briefly met Seneca's brother, Gallio. Paul's Epistle to Philemon says he was imprisoned in Rome and that the Praetorian Guard knew of this; the Guard was at one point commanded by Burrus, an ally of Seneca. Stoicism, much like Hellenistic Judaism, was considered a precursor to Christianity that helped influence its stances and terminology; conscientia ('conscience') was originally a Stoic term, for example, and Stoicism's criticisms of the (pagan) Roman religion was something Christians were eager to take for themselves as well. The Christian polemicist Tertullian called Seneca "saepe noster" ("often ours") and approved of his criticism of pagan superstition. The correspondence was in circulation during the Middle Ages among Latin-reading areas (Western Europe, rather than the Greek-reading Byzantine East), and likely contributed to Seneca having a good reputation among medieval Christians. The medieval authors Peter of Cluny, Peter Abelard, and Petrarch all seem familiar with the correspondence. A few medieval writers such as Giovanni Colonna and Giovanni Boccaccio even claimed that Seneca had outright converted to Christianity before his suicide in 65 CE, partially on the basis of the correspondence.

== Scholarly analysis ==
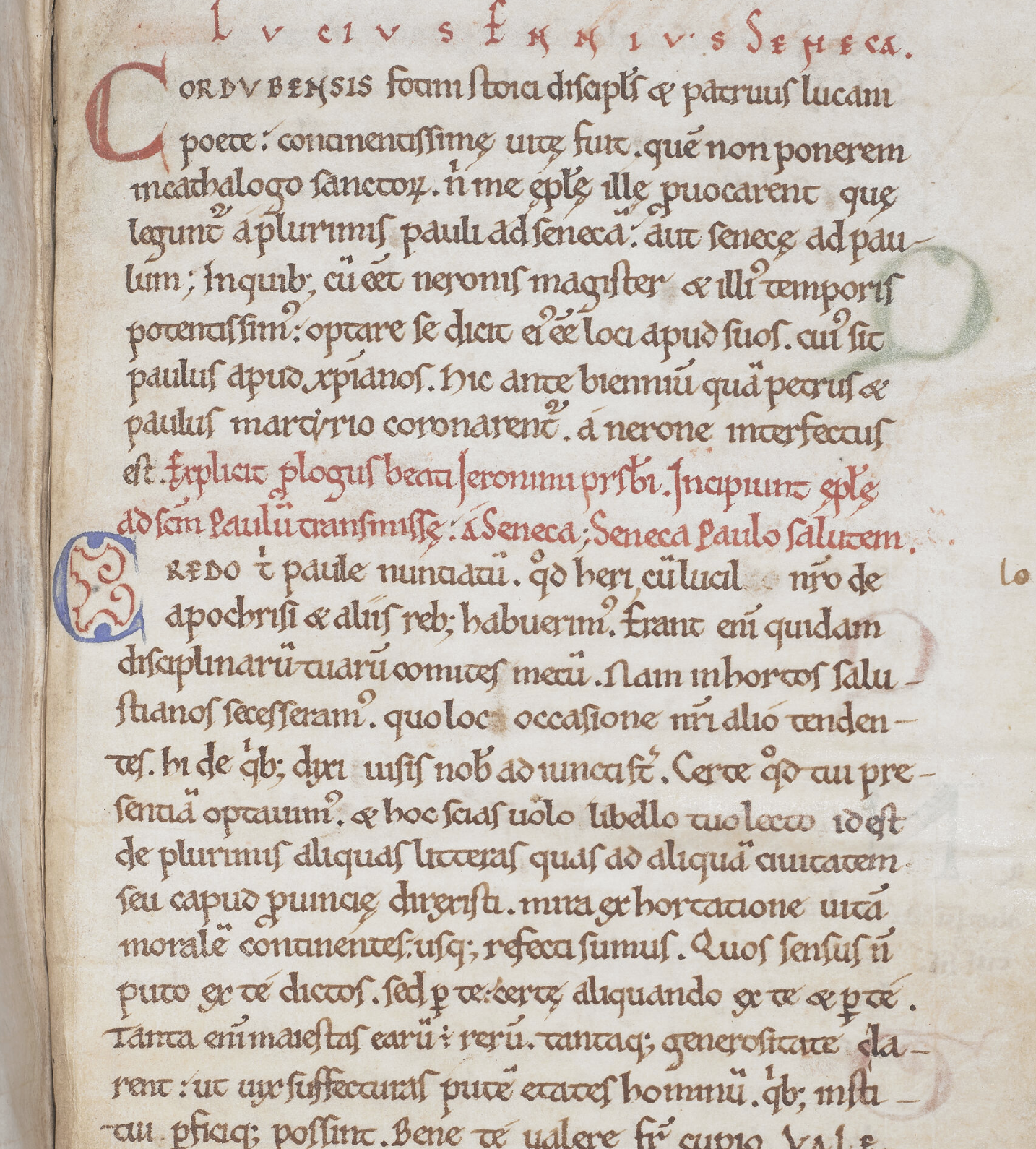
The first letter, as seen on folio 154 recto of Egerton MS 654, a 12th-century manuscript held by the British Library

Scholars almost universally believe the correspondence to be forged. (Note: A tiny minority of 20th and 21st century works do support at least partial authenticity of the correspondence. Ilaria Ramelli is a rare example of an academic who cautiously supports partial authenticity, arguing that Paul's side of the correspondence might possibly be legitimate. Italian historian Marta Sordi also supports the authenticity of the letters.) During the 15th century in the Renaissance, more skeptical analysis raised doubts on the veracity of the correspondence. Scholars such as Lorenzo Valla found that the writing style matched neither Seneca nor Paul, and the letters were denounced by Erasmus. Later scholars detected errors of fact and chronology that the genuine Seneca would not have made, but a forger not intricately familiar with Roman history writing centuries later might have. (Note: For example, the letter discussing the Great Fire of Rome is dated to March 64 CE, but the Great Fire occurred afterward, in July.) Scholars noticed with skepticism just how late the letters appeared in history; Lactantius, a Christian author writing earlier in the 4th century, makes no mention of any such correspondence, despite frequently citing Seneca and positively evaluating both him and Paul. This suggests their creation in the middle of the 4th century, such that Lactantius would have been unfamiliar, yet Jerome would think them legitimate. The Latin style of the collection is also a good match to 4th-century works, such as the letters of Symmachus.

The 11th letter dated to 64 CE bears a different writing style of Latin from the other letters, and is out of chronological sequence with the rest of the correspondence. This leads scholars to think that a different forger may have written that letter. The 13th and 14th epistles also have a somewhat different style than the others, indicating they too may have been appended later. Additionally, the 14th epistle is unusually direct about Paul's evangelism, with him calling on Seneca to "make yourself a new herald of Jesus Christ", yet Jerome only quotes the 12th epistle in support of listing Seneca as a saint, leading to suspicion that the version of the correspondence Jerome read in the late 4th century did not yet include the final two letters.

The motive of the forger is unknown. J. B. Lightfoot wrote that it was likely "either to recommend Seneca to Christian readers or to recommend Christianity to students of Seneca," a position that Adolf von Harnack agreed with. Claude Barlow thought that the writings might have been a rhetorical exercise; essentially, a fictional essay by a novice writer practicing their craft that escaped to readers who did not realize its origins. Similarly, the work was perhaps an epistolary novel, similar to the letters of Chion of Heraclea. J. K. Elliott wrote that it was "to show the superiority of Christianity over pagan philosophy." Bart Ehrman suggests that the creation of the letters may have been part of early Christian apologia. In this theory, a Roman pagan polemic against Christianity was the claim that Paul was not particularly significant in his era. The forger accepted the somewhat elitist terms of this argument – that only "great" people deserve to be listened to – and responded by having the greatest philosopher of Paul's day endorse and praise Paul, so mere flattery was enough to serve the purpose of the apologist.

Critics generally deride the worth of the correspondence as well for not including much of anything interesting, such as a debate on the merits of Stoicism, Christianity, or even just court gossip. Erasmus wrote that "I do not see how he could have made these letters in a more feeble or insipid fashion." Philip Schaff in his History of the Christian Church said that "They are very poor in thought and style, full of errors of chronology and history, and undoubtedly a forgery." J. B. Lightfoot was caustic about the overall worth of the correspondence, criticizing "the poverty of thought and style, the errors in chronology and history, and the whole conception of the relative positions of the Stoic philosopher and the Christian Apostle" which "betray clearly the hand of a forger."

As they are now universally allowed to be spurious, it will be unnecessary to state at length the grounds of their condemnation. It is sufficient to say that the letters are inane and unworthy throughout; that the style of either correspondent is unlike his genuine writings; that the relations between the two, as there represented, are highly improbable; and lastly, that the chronological notices (which however are absent in some important [manuscripts]) are wrong in almost every instance. Thus, independently of the unbroken silence of three centuries and a half about this correspondence, internal evidence alone is sufficient to condemn them hopelessly.

— J. B. Lightfoot, Dissertations on the Apostolic Age, The Letters of Paul and Seneca

== Bibliography ==
- Briones, David E.; Dodson, Joseph R. (2017). "Introduction". Paul and Seneca in Dialogue. Leiden: Brill. pp. 1–21. ISBN 9789004341357.
- Ehrman, Bart (2005). Lost Christianities: The Battles for Scripture and the Faiths We Never Knew (Illustrated, Reprint ed.). Oxford University Press. p. 206. ISBN 9780195182491.
- Ehrman, Bart (2012). Forgery and Counterforgery: The Use of Literary Deceit in Early Christian Polemics. Oxford University Press. pp. 533–539. ISBN 9780199928033.
- Elliott, James Keith (1993). The Apocryphal New Testament. Oxford University Press. pp. 547–553. ISBN 0-19-826182-9.
- Hine, Harry M. (2017). "Seneca and Paul: The First Two Thousand Years". In Briones, David E.; Dodson, Joseph R. (eds.). Paul and Seneca in Dialogue. Leiden: Brill. p. 22–48. doi:10.1163/9789004341364_003. ISBN 9789004341364.
- Kurfess, Alfons (1965) [1964]. "The Apocryphal Correspondence Between Seneca and Paul". In Schneemelcher, Wilhelm (ed.). New Testament Apocrypha: Volume Two: Writings Relating to the Apostles; Apocalypses and Related Subjects. Translated by Wilson, Robert McLachlan. Philadelphia: Westminster Press. p. 133–141.
- Lightfoot, Joseph Barber (1892). Dissertations on the Apostolic Age. Macmillan.
