= R. A. B. Mynors =

British classical scholar (1903–1989)

Sir R. A. B. Mynors FBA
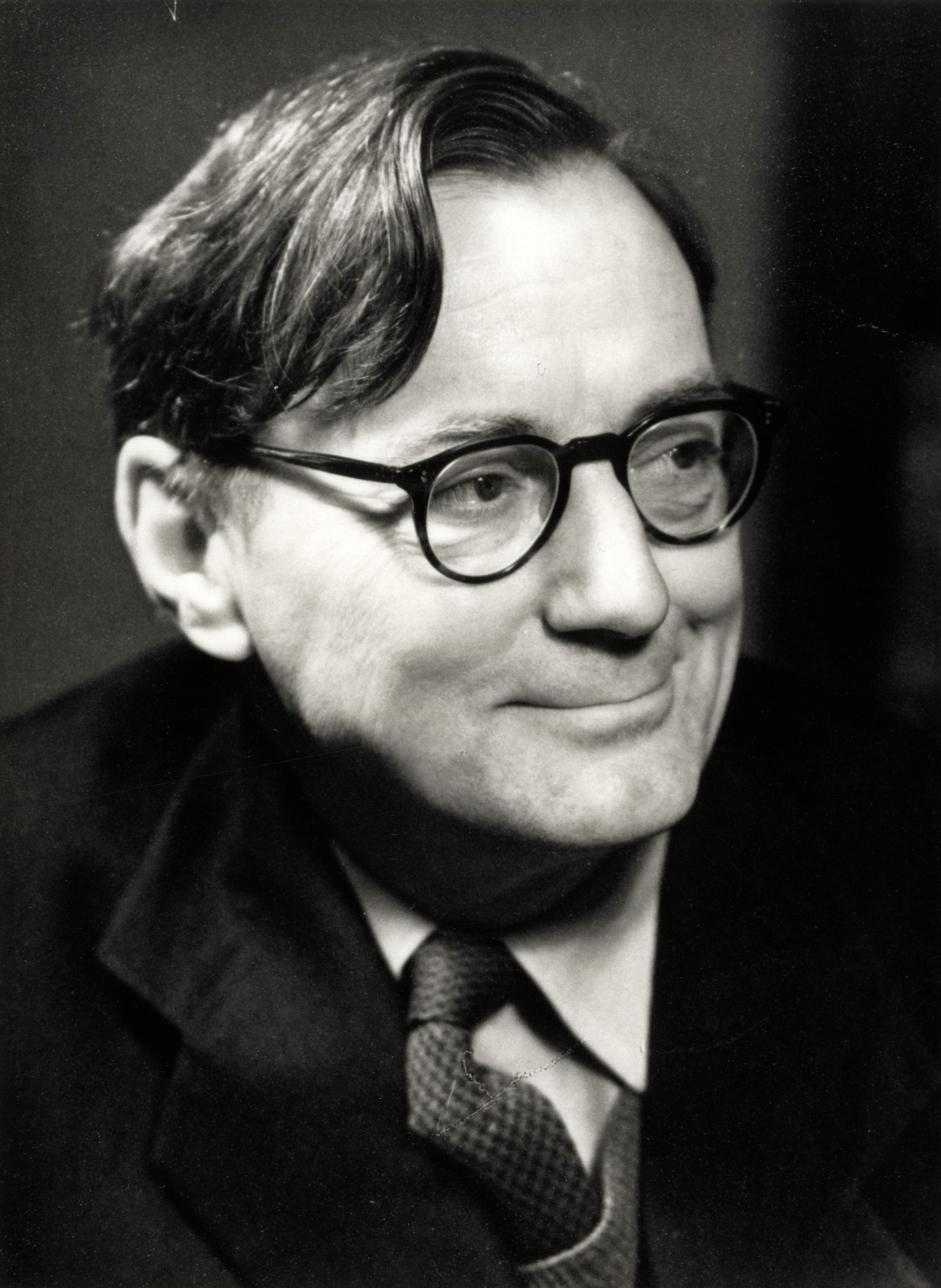
- Born: Roger Aubrey Baskerville Mynors; 28 July 1903; Langley Burrell, Wiltshire, England
- Died: 17 October 1989 (aged 86) near Hereford, England
- Spouse: Lavinia Alington (m. 1945)
- Awards: Knight Bachelor (1963)

Academic background
- Education: Balliol College, Oxford
- Influences: Cyril Alington; M. R. James; Eduard Fraenkel

Academic work
- Discipline: Classics
- Institutions: Oxford University; Cambridge University
- Influenced: Michael Winterbottom; E. J. Kenney; Leighton Durham Reynolds; R. J. Tarrant

Sir Roger Aubrey Baskerville Mynors FBA (28 July 1903 – 17 October 1989) was an English classicist and medievalist who held the senior chairs of Latin at the universities of Oxford and Cambridge. A textual critic, he was an expert in the study of manuscripts and their role in the reconstruction of classical texts.

Mynors's career spanned most of the 20th century and straddled two of England's leading universities, Oxford and Cambridge. Educated at Eton College, he read Literae Humaniores at Balliol College, Oxford, and spent the early years of his career as a Fellow of that college. He was Kennedy Professor of Latin at Cambridge from 1944 to 1953 and Corpus Christi Professor of Latin at Oxford from 1953 until his retirement in 1970. He died in a car accident in 1989, aged 86, while travelling to his country residence, Treago Castle in Herefordshire.

Mynors held a reputation as one of Britain's foremost classicists. He was an expert on palaeography, and has been credited with unravelling a number of highly complex manuscript relationships in his catalogues of the Balliol and Durham Cathedral libraries. His publications on classical subjects include critical editions of Virgil, Catullus, Pliny the Younger, Bede and Cassiodorus. He also served on the editorial board of the comprehensive edition of the works of Erasmus. The final achievement of his scholarly career, a comprehensive commentary on Virgil's Georgics, was published posthumously. Mynors was created Knight Bachelor in 1963.

== Early life and secondary education ==
Roger Aubrey Baskerville Mynors was born in Langley Burrell, Wiltshire, on 28 July 1903 into a family of Herefordshire gentry. The Mynors family had owned the estate of Treago Castle since the 15th century, and he resided there in later life. His mother was Margery Musgrave, and his father, Aubrey Baskerville Mynors, was an Anglican clergyman and rector of Langley Burrell, who had been secretary to the Pan-Anglican Congress, held in London in 1908. Among his four siblings was his identical twin brother Humphrey Mynors, who went on to become Deputy Governor of the Bank of England. The brothers shared a close friendship and lived together in their ancestral home after Roger's retirement.

Mynors attended Summer Fields School in Oxford, and in 1916 entered Eton College as a King's Scholar. At Eton, he was part of a generation of pupils that included the historian Steven Runciman and the author George Orwell. His precocious interest in Latin literature and its transmission (Note: Transmission refers to the ways in which classical texts were circulated and preserved prior to the invention of printing.) was fostered by the encouragement of two of his teachers, Cyril Alington and M. R. James. Alington became an influential mentor and friend since he, like Mynors, was fascinated with the manuscript traditions of medieval Europe.

== Academic career ==
=== Balliol College, Oxford ===
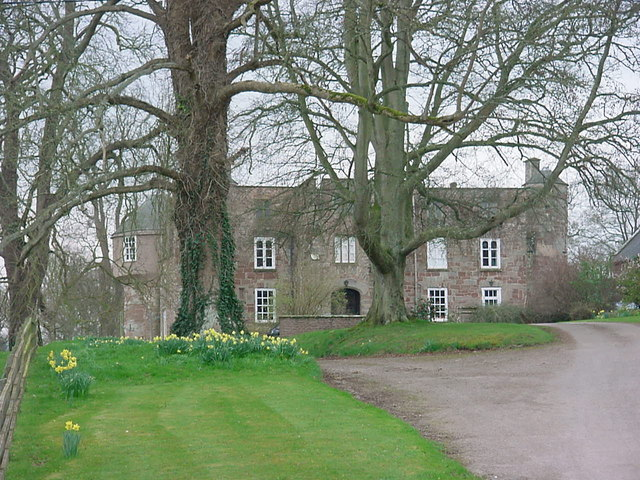
Treago Castle, the Mynors family's country residence

In 1922, Mynors won the Domus exhibition, a scholarship to study Classics at Balliol College, Oxford. Attending the college at the same time as the literary critic Cyril Connolly, the musicologist Jack Westrup, the future Vice-Chancellor of the University of Oxford, Walter Fraser Oakeshott, and the historian Richard Pares, he was highly successful in his academic studies. Graduating with a Bachelor of Arts in 1926, he won the Hertford (1924), Craven (1924), and Derby (1926) scholarships. He was elected to a fellowship at Balliol and became a tutor in Classics. In 1935 he was elevated to a University Lecturership. At the time of his appointment, much of Mynors's teaching focused on the poet Virgil, whose complete works he edited in the following decades.

His tenure at Oxford University saw the beginning of his comprehensive work on medieval manuscripts. From the late 1920s onwards, Mynors was drawn more to matters of codicology than to purely classical questions. He prepared an edition of the 6th-century scholar Cassiodorus, for which he travelled extensively in continental Europe; a critical edition was published in 1937. In 1929, he was appointed librarian of Balliol College. This position gave impetus to create a catalogue of the college's medieval manuscripts. A similar project, a catalogue of the manuscripts housed at Durham Cathedral, was compiled in the 1930s. Mynors's interest in codicology gave rise to a close co-operation with the medievalists Richard William Hunt and Neil Ripley Ker.

In 1936, towards the end of his tenure at Balliol, Mynors met Eduard Fraenkel, then holder of a chair in Latin at Oxford. Having relocated to England because of the increasing discrimination against German Jews, Fraenkel was a leading exponent of Germany's scholarly tradition. His mentorship contributed to Mynors's transformation from amateur scholar to a professional critic of Latin texts. They maintained a close friendship, which exposed Mynors to other German philologists, including Rudolf Pfeiffer and Otto Skutsch.

Mynors spent the winter of 1938 as a visiting scholar at Harvard University. In 1940, after a brief return to Balliol, British involvement in the Second World War led to his being employed at the Exchange Control Department of Her Majesty's Treasury responsible for the administration of foreign currency transactions. At Balliol, Mynors taught from 1926 until 1944, a time during which he mentored a number of future scholars, including the Wittgenstein expert David Pears and the classicist Donald Russell.

=== Pembroke College, Cambridge ===
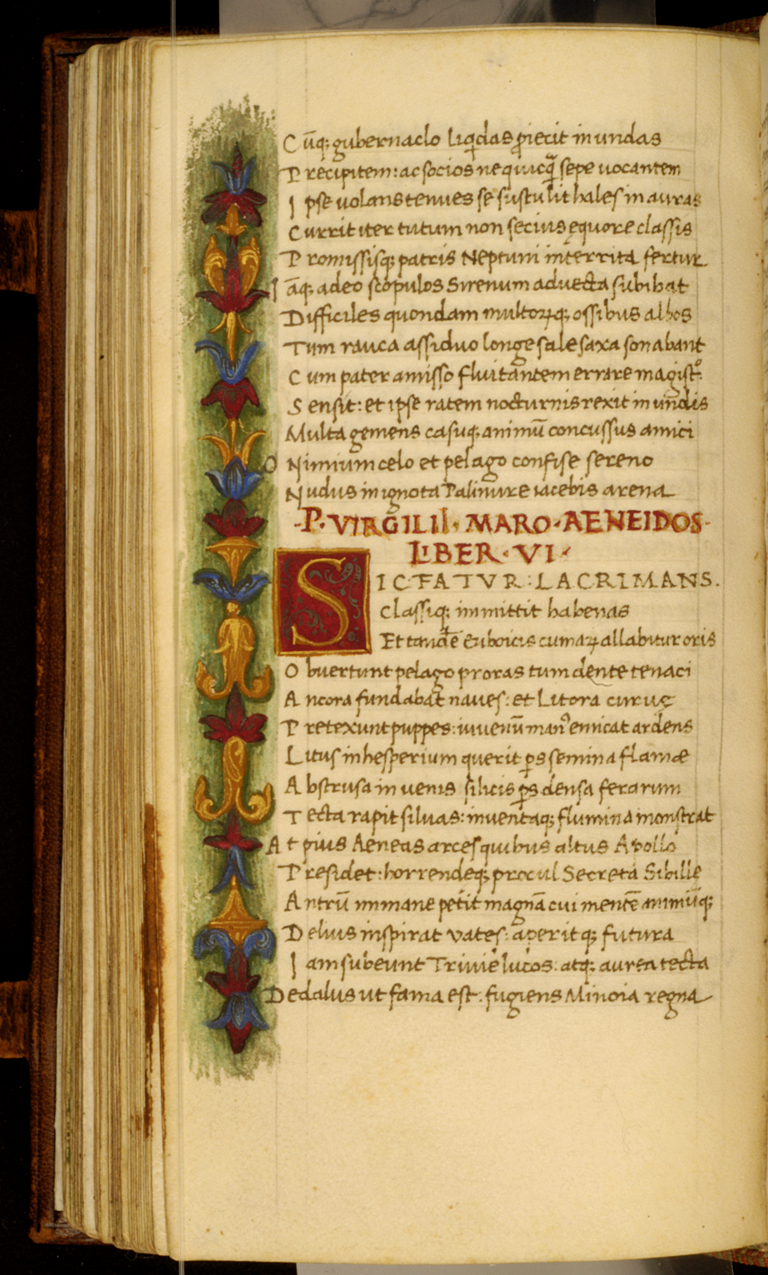
Mynors edited the standard edition of the Aeneid. This 15th-century manuscript contains the beginning of the poem's sixth book.

In 1944, encouraged by Fraenkel, Mynors took up an offer to assume the Kennedy Professorship of Latin at the University of Cambridge. He also became a fellow of Pembroke College. In 1945, shortly after moving to Cambridge, he married Lavinia Alington, a medical researcher and daughter of his former teacher and Eton headmaster, Cyril Alington. The couple had no children. The move to Cambridge meant an advancement of his academic career, but he soon came to contemplate a return to Oxford. He applied unsuccessfully to become master of Balliol College after the position had been vacated by Sandie Lindsay in 1949. The historian David Keir was elected in his stead.

His post at Cambridge caused changes to Mynors's profile as an academic. His duties at Balliol had centred on the supervision of undergraduates, while he was free to focus on palaeographical topics in his research. At Cambridge, Mynors was required to lecture extensively on Latin literature and to supervise research students, a task of which he had little experience. The duties of his university post left little time to get involved in the activities of the college, which led Mynors to regret his departure from Oxford, going so far as to describe the decision as a "fundamental error" in a personal letter.

Although his post was chiefly that of a Latinist, his involvement in the publication of medieval texts intensified during the 1940s. After he was approached by V. H. Galbraith, a historian of the Middle Ages, Mynors became an editor on Nelson's Medieval Texts series in 1946. Working on the series first as a joint editor, and from 1962 as an advisory editor, he edited the Latin text for a number of volumes. He was the principal author of editions of Walter Map's De nugis curialium and of Bede's Ecclesiastical History. In 1947, he collaborated with the Oxford historian Alfred Brotherston Emden, who consulted Mynors for his own work on the history of the University of Oxford while assisting, in turn, with the Balliol catalogue.

=== Corpus Christi College, Oxford ===
In 1953, Mynors was appointed Corpus Christi Professor of Latin and could thus return to Oxford to succeed Eduard Fraenkel. At the time, there was no precedent for such a move between senior chairs at Oxford and Cambridge. Most of his work as an editor of Latin texts took place during this second period at Oxford. Working for the Oxford Classical Texts series, he produced critical editions of the complete works of Catullus (1958) and Virgil (1969), and of Pliny the Younger's Epistulae (1963). Though focusing on classical subjects, he continued to work on manuscripts as a curator at the Bodleian Library. In the 17 years he spent at the college, Mynors sought to maintain its position as a centre of excellence in the Classics and fostered contacts with a new generation of Latinists, including E. J. Kenney, Wendell Clausen, Leighton Durham Reynolds, R. J. Tarrant and Michael Winterbottom.

== Retirement and death ==
In 1970, Mynors retired from his teaching duties and relocated to his estate at Treago Castle. In addition to an intense dedication to arboriculture, his retirement saw work on a commentary on Vergil's Georgics, which was published posthumously in 1990. He translated the correspondence of the humanist Desiderius Erasmus for the University of Toronto Press, and maintained an interest in the nearby Hereford Cathedral, serving as the chairman of the Friends of the Cathedral from 1979 to 1984. In 1980, the cathedral's parish set up a fund in Mynors's name to acquire a collection of rare books.

On 17 October 1989, Mynors was killed in a road accident outside Hereford on his way back from working on the cathedral's manuscripts. He was buried at St Weonards. Meryl Jancey, the cathedral's Honorary Archivist, later revealed that Mynors had on the same day expressed his delight about his own scholarly work on the death of Bede: "He told me he was glad that he had translated for the Oxford Medieval Texts the account of Bede's death, and that Bede had not ceased in what he saw as his work for God until the very end."

== Contributions to scholarship ==
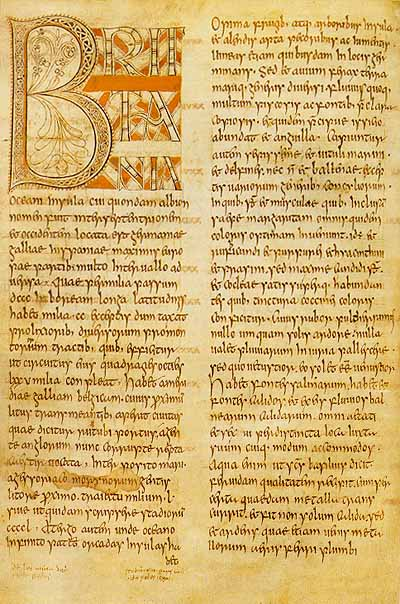
A leaf from the Saint Petersburg Bede which Mynors used in his edition of the Ecclesiastical History

=== Cataloguing manuscripts ===
Mynors's chief interest lay in palaeography, the study of pre-modern manuscripts. He is credited with unravelling a number of complex manuscript relationships in his catalogues of the Balliol and Durham Cathedral libraries. He had particular interest in the physical state of manuscripts, including examining blots and rulings. For the Balliol archivist Bethany Hamblen, this interest typifies the importance Mynors gave to formal features when evaluating hand-written books.

=== Critical editions ===
A series of critical editions on Latin authors constitutes the entirety of Mynors's purely classical scholarship. Because of his reluctance to emend (Note: Emendation occurs when a textual critic replaces the transmitted text with a supplement of his or her own creation.) beyond the transmitted readings, Mynors has been described as a conservative textual critic. This approach is thought to have originated in his tendency to ascribe great historical value to manuscripts and their scribes.

The first of his critical editions is of the Institutiones of Cassiodorus, the first produced since 1679. In the introduction, Mynors offered new insights into the complex manuscript tradition without resolving the fundamental question of how the original text was expanded in later copies. The edition was praised by the reviewer Stephen Gaselee in The Classical Review, who said that it would provide solid foundations for a commentary; writing for the Journal of Theological Studies, Alexander Souter described it as a "definitive edition" and praised Mynors's classification of the manuscripts.

In 1958, Mynors published an edition of the poems of Catullus. His text followed two recent editions by Moritz Schuster (1949) and Ignazio Cazzaniga (1956), with which he had to compete. Taking a conservative stance on the problems posed by Catullus's text, Mynors did not print any modern emendations unless they corrected obvious scribal errors. Contrary to his conservative instincts, he rejected the traditional archaising orthography of the manuscripts in favour of normalised Latin spelling. This intervention was termed by the philologist Revilo Oliver as "the victory of common sense" in Catullan criticism. For the reviewer Philip Levine, Mynors's edition sets itself apart from previous texts by its scrutiny of a "large bulk" of unexamined manuscripts. Writing in 2000, the Latinist Stephen Harrison criticised Mynors's text for the "omission of many important conjectures from the text", while lauding it for its handling of the manuscript tradition.

His edition of Pliny's Epistulae employed a similar method but aimed to be an intermediate step rather than an overhaul of the text. Mynors's edition of the complete works of Vergil revamped the text constructed by F. A. Hirtzel in 1900 which had become outdated. He enlarged the manuscript base by drawing on 13 minor witnesses from the ninth century and added an index of personal names. Its judgement of these minor manuscripts, in particular, is described by the Latinist W. S. Maguinness as the edition's strength. Given the incomplete state of the Aeneid, Vergil's epic poem on the wanderings of Aeneas, Mynors departed from his cautious editorial stance by printing a small number of modern conjectures.

Mynors established a new text of Bede's Ecclesiastical History for the edition he published together with the historian Bertram Colgrave. His edition of this text followed that of Charles Plummer published in 1896. Collation of the Saint Petersburg Bede, an 8th-century manuscript unknown to Plummer, allowed Mynors to construct a new version of the M tradition. Although he did not append a detailed critical apparatus and exegetical notes, his analysis of the textual history was praised by the Church historian Gerald Bonner as "lucid" and "excellently done". Mynors himself considered the edition superficial and felt that its publication had been premature. Winterbottom voices a similar opinion, writing that the text "hardly differ[ed] from Plummer's".

=== Commentary on the Georgics ===
His scholarly legacy was enhanced by his posthumously published commentary on Vergil's Georgics. A comprehensive guide to Virgil's didactic poem on agriculture, the commentary has been lauded for its meticulous attention to technical detail and for Mynors's profound knowledge of agricultural practice. In spite of its accomplishments, the classicist Patricia Johnston has noted that the commentary fails to engage seriously with contemporary scholarship on the text, such as the tension between optimistic and pessimistic (Note: In scholarship of Vergil, 'pessimism' describes readings of his poetry discerning a dark, downbeat outlook. The opposite view is termed 'optimism'.) readings. In this regard, Mynors's last work reflects his lifelong scepticism towards literary criticism of any persuasion.

== Legacy ==
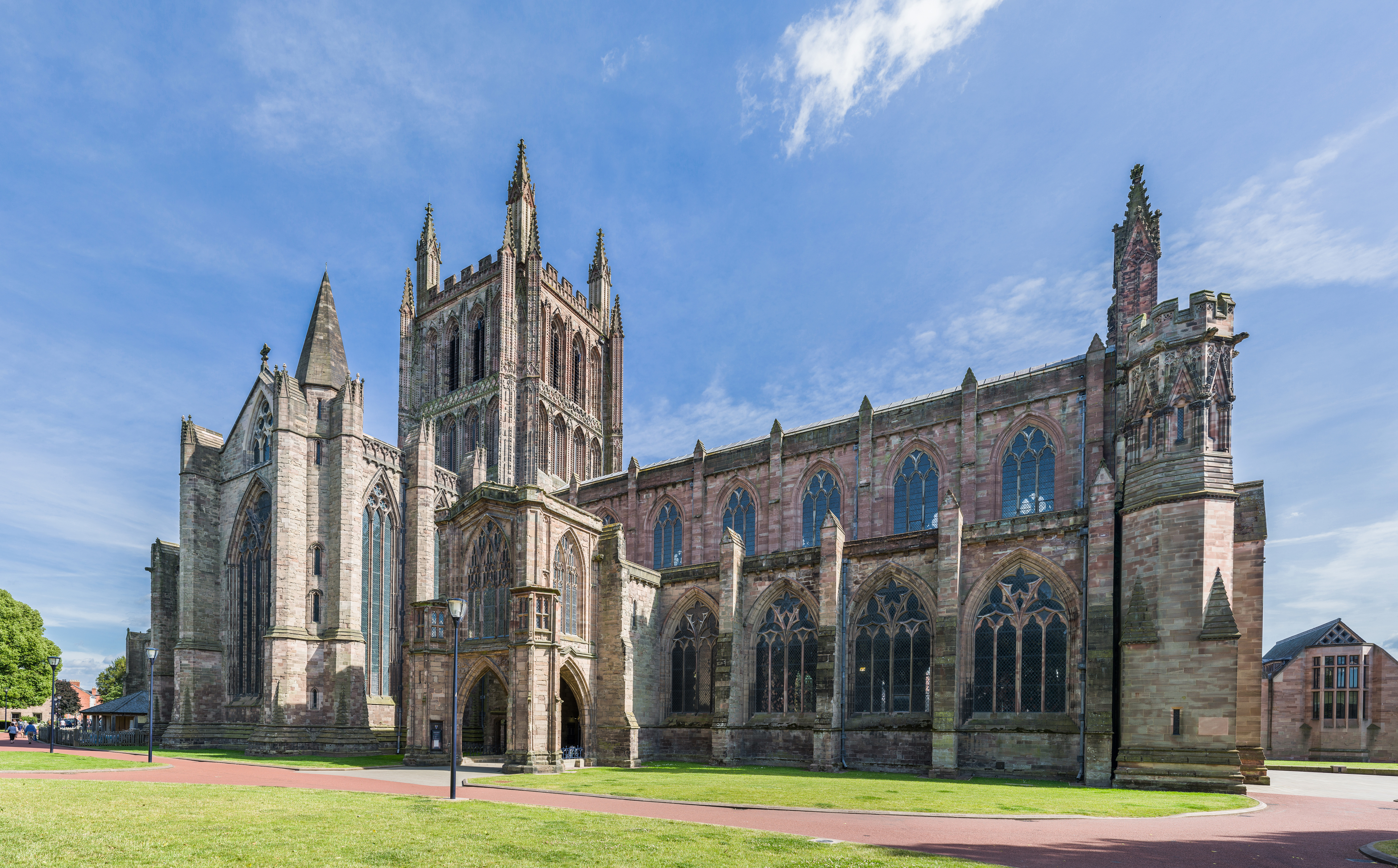
In his retirement, Mynors cultivated an interest in Hereford Cathedral.

During his career, Mynors gained a reputation as "one of the leading classical scholars of his generation". He drew praise from the scholarly community for his textual work. The Latinist Harold Gotoff states that he was an "extraordinary scholar", while Winterbottom describes his critical editions as "distinguished". His Oxford editions of the poets Catullus and Vergil in particular are singled out by Gotoff as "excellent"; they still serve as the standard editions of their texts in the early 21st century.

== Honours ==
Mynors was elected a Fellow of the British Academy in 1944 and made a Knight Bachelor in 1963. He was granted honorary fellowships by Balliol College, Oxford (1963), Pembroke College, Cambridge (1965), and Corpus Christi College, Oxford (1970). The Warburg Institute honoured him in the same way. Mynors was also an honorary member of the American Academy of Arts and Sciences, the American Philosophical Society, and the Istituto Nazionale di Studi Romani (it). He held honorary degrees from the universities of Cambridge, Durham, Edinburgh, Sheffield, and Toronto. In 1983, on his 80th birthday, Mynors's service to the study of Latin texts was honoured by the publication of Texts and Transmission: A Survey of the Latin Classics, edited by the Oxford Latinist L. D. Reynolds. In 2020, an exhibition was held at Balliol to commemorate his scholarship on the college library.

== Publications ==
The following books were authored by Mynors:

- Cassiodori Senatoris Institutiones. Clarendon Press. 1937. OCLC 3828537.
- Durham Cathedral Manuscripts to the End of the Twelfth Century. Oxford University Press. 1939. OCLC 7605487.
- C. Valerii Catulli Carmina (Reprinted ed.). Oxford University Press. 1958. ISBN 978-0-19-814604-9.
- Catalogue of the Manuscripts of Balliol College (Reprinted ed.). Oxford University Press. 1963. ISBN 978-0-19-818117-0.
- C. Plini Caecili Secundi: Epistularum Libri Decem (Reprinted ed.). Clarendon Press. 1963. ISBN 978-0-19-814643-8.
- XII Panegyrici Latini (Reprinted ed.). Oxford: Clarendon Press. 1964. ISBN 978-0-19-814647-6.
- Bede: Ecclesiastical History of the English People. Edited with Bertram Colgrave. Oxford University Press. 1969. ISBN 978-0-19-822202-6.
- P. Vergili Maronis Opera. Clarendon Press. 1969. ISBN 978-0-19-814653-7.
- Walter Map: De Nugis Curialium. Courtiers' Trifles. Edited and translated by M. R. James. Revised with Christopher N. L. Brooke. Oxford University Press. 1983. ISBN 978-0-19-822236-1.
- Virgil, Georgics. Oxford University Press. 1990. ISBN 978-0-19-814978-1.

== Bibliography ==
- Bonner, Gerald (1970). "Review of Bede's Ecclesiastical History of the English People. Edited by Bertram Colgrave and R. A. B. Mynors". The Journal of Ecclesiastical History. 22: 132–134. doi:10.1017/S0022046900057924. ISSN 1469-7637.
- Fuchs, J. W. (1966). "Review of R. A. B. Mynors C. Caecilii Plinii Secundi Epistularum libri decem". Mnemosyne. 19: 89. doi:10.1163/156852566X01249. ISSN 1568-525X.
- Gaselee, Stephen (1937). "The Institutiones of Cassiodorus". The Classical Review. 51: 188–189. doi:10.1017/S0009840X00071560. ISSN 0009-840X. S2CID 162322683.
- Gatch, Milton (1970). "Review of Bede's Ecclesiastical History of the English People. Edited by Bertram Colgrave and R. A. B. Mynors". Church History. 39: 543. doi:10.2307/3162934. ISSN 1755-2613. JSTOR 3162934. S2CID 161140635.
- Gotoff, Harold C. (1991). "Sir Roger Aubrey Baskerville Mynors (July 28, 1903 – October 17, 1989)". Proceedings of the American Philosophical Society. 135 (2): 309–311. ISSN 0003-049X. JSTOR 987037.
- Hamblen, Bethany (2020). 'Messing about with Manuscripts.' R. A. B. Mynors and Balliol's Medieval Library (PDF). Oxford: Balliol College, University of Oxford. ISBN 978-1-83853-552-0.
- Harrison, Stephen (2000). "The Need for a New Text of Catullus". In Reitz, Christiane (ed.). Vom Text zum Buch. St. Katharinen: Scripta Mercaturae. pp. 63–79. ISBN 978-3-89590-095-2.
- Johnston, Patricia (1991). "Review of Virgil, Georgics, Edited with a Commentary by R. A. B. Mynors, with a Preface by R. G. M. Nisbet". Bryn Mawr Classical Review. ISSN 1055-7660.
- Levine, Philip (1959). "Review of C. Valerii Catulli Carmina by R. A. B. Mynors" (PDF). American Journal of Philology. 80: 415–424. doi:10.2307/292181. ISSN 0002-9475. JSTOR 292181.
- Maguinness, W. S. (1971). "A New Text of Virgil". The Classical Review. 21 (2): 197–200. doi:10.1017/S0009840X00279110. ISSN 0009-840X. JSTOR 707247. S2CID 161190954.
- Nisbet, Robin G. M. (2004). "Mynors, Sir Roger Aubrey Baskerville". In Cannadine, David (ed.). Oxford Dictionary of National Biography (online ed.). Oxford University Press. doi:10.1093/ref:odnb/39814. (Subscription, Wikipedia Library access or UK public library membership required.)
- Oliver, Revilo P. (1959). "Review of C. Valerii Catulli carmina. Edited by R. A. B. Mynors" (PDF). Classical Philology. 54: 51–53. doi:10.1086/364328. ISSN 0009-837X. JSTOR 266211.
- Sewter, E. R. A. (1970). "Brief Reviews" (PDF). Greece and Rome. 17 (1): 105–117. doi:10.1017/S0017383500017411. ISSN 1477-4550. JSTOR 642333. S2CID 248518852.
- Souter, A. (1937). "Cassiodori Senatoris Institutiones, edited from the manuscripts by R. A. B. Mynors". Journal of Theological Studies. 38: 194–196. doi:10.1093/jts/os-XXXVIII.150.194. ISSN 0022-5185. JSTOR 23956521.
- Trappes-Lomax, John M. (2007). Catullus: A Textual Reappraisal. Swansea: The Classical Press of Wales. ISBN 978-1-905125-15-9.
- Williams, Gordon (1992). "Virgil: Georgics". Hermathena. 152: 88–91. ISSN 0018-0750. JSTOR 23040995.
- Winterbottom, Michael (1993). "Roger Aubrey Baskerville Mynors 1903–1989" (PDF). Proceedings of the British Academy. 80: 371–401. ISSN 0068-1202. Archived from the original (PDF) on 28 July 2021.

Academic offices
Preceded by William Blair Anderson	Kennedy Professor of Latin; Cambridge University; 1944 to 1953	Succeeded by C.O. Brink
Preceded by Eduard Fraenkel	Corpus Christi Professor of Latin; University of Oxford; 1953 to 1970	Succeeded by Robin Nisbet
