= D'Avray =

d'Avray is a surname. Notable people with the surname include:

- David d'Avray, British historian
- Mich d'Avray, football manager and former player

== See also ==
- Saint-Just-d'Avray, commune in Rhône, France
- Ville-d'Avray, commune in Hauts-de-Seine, France
