= Richard Rutherford =

British classical scholar (born 1956)

- Born: 2 September 1956 (age 70); Edinburgh

Academic background
- Education: Worcester College, Oxford
- Thesis: Style and content in the Meditations of Marcus Aurelius (1985)
- Doctoral advisor: Donald Russell

Academic work
- Discipline: Classics
- Sub-discipline: Ancient Greek literature
- Institutions: Christ Church, Oxford

Richard B. Rutherford (born 2 September 1956) is a British classical scholar, known for his work on ancient Greek literature from the archaic to the imperial period.

== Biography ==
Rutherford was born on 2 September 1956 in Edinburgh. He was educated at Robert Gordon's College, Aberdeen, and then studied as an undergraduate and graduate student at Worcester College, Oxford. He obtained his doctorate in 1985, with a thesis titled "Style and content in the Meditations of Marcus Aurelius", written under the supervision of Donald Russell.

After holding a research lectureship from 1981, Rutherford was appointed in 1982 as Tutor in Classics at Christ Church, Oxford, following the death of Colin Macleod. At Christ Church, Rutherford held the college offices of Curator of Pictures (1995–2000, 2004–2006), Censor (2007–2011) and Censor Theologiae (2019). He also served as chair of the sub-faculty of classical languages and literature within the Faculty of Classics.

Rutherford retired at the end of September 2023. A symposium in his honour, "Clio and Her Elder Sisters: Comparative Studies in Epic, Tragedy, and Historiography", was held at Christ Church on the occasion of his retirement.

== Selected publications ==
=== Monographs ===
- Rutherford, R. B. (1991). The Meditations of Marcus Aurelius: A Study. Oxford University Press. ISBN 9780198147558.
- Rutherford, R. B. (1995). The Art of Plato: Ten Essays in Platonic Interpretation. Harvard University Press. ISBN 9780674048119.
- Rutherford, R. B. (2005). Classical Literature: A Concise History. Blackwell. ISBN 9780631231332.
- Rutherford, R. B. (2012). Greek Tragic Style: Form, Language, and Interpretation. Cambridge University Press. ISBN 9781107470750.
- Rutherford, R. B. (2013). Homer (2nd ed.). Cambridge University Press. ISBN 9781107670167.

=== Editions of ancient texts ===
- Rutherford, R. B. (1992). Homer: Odyssey, Books XIX–XX. Cambridge University Press. ISBN 9780521347600.
- Rutherford, R. B. (2018). Homer: Iliad, Book XVIII. Cambridge University Press. ISBN 9781107643123.
