= Nigel Wilson (classicist) =

British classical scholar and palaeographer (born 1935)

Nigel Guy Wilson (born 23 July 1935) is a British scholar, emeritus fellow and tutor in Classics, Lincoln College, Oxford. His field of research is ancient Greek history, language and literature, and culture, art and archaeology of the Byzantine world.

Since retiring in 2002 he has continued his researches into Greek palaeography, textual criticism and the history of classical scholarship. He edited Sophocles (with Hugh Lloyd-Jones), Aristophanes, Herodotus and the Bibliotheca of Photios for the Oxford Classical Texts, each coming with a critical companion. He also critically edited the scholia to Aristophanes' Knights and Acharnians, Menander Rhetor's treatise (with D. A. Russell), the Historical Miscellany by Claudius Aelianus (for the Loeb Classical Library), and Pietro Bembo's Speech in defense of Greek Literature. He also published an anthology of Byzantine prose and translated Basil the Great's Address to Young Men.

Another substantial piece of work was a contribution to the study of the famous Archimedes Palimpsest, which was sold at auction in New York in 1998 for $2,000,000; the results of a collaboration lasting ten years and involving experts in various fields appeared in The Archimedes palimpsest (Cambridge University Press 2011), which was described by the reviewer in the TLS as "the most beautiful book produced in this century". He is a trustee of the Herculaneum Society, and an editor of the series Sozomena published for the Society by Walter De Gruyter, along with Alessandro Barchiesi, Robert Fowler, and Lucia Prauscello. He was elected a Fellow of the British Academy in 1980, which awarded him the Kenyon Medal for distinguished contributions to scholarship.

== Published works ==
- Stefanović, D. I.; Wilson, N. G. (1963). Manuscripts of Byzantine chant in Oxford. Oxford: Bodleian Library.
- Reynolds, L. D.; Wilson, N. G. (1968). Scribes and Scholars: A Guide to the Transmission of Greek and Latin Literature. Oxford: University Press.
- Mervyn Jones, D.; Wilson, N. G., eds. (1969). Scholia Vetera in Aristophanis Equites – Scholia Tricliniana in Aristophanis Equites. Scholia in Aristophanem, I.2. Groningen – Amsterdam: Wolters-Noordhoff N. V. – Swets & Zeitlinger.
- Wilson, N. G., ed. (1971). An Anthology of Byzantine Prose. Kleine Texte für Vorlesungen und Übungen, 189. Berlin – New York: W. De Gruyter.
- Wilson, N. G., ed. (1972–1973). Mediaeval Greek Bookhands: Examples Selected from Greek Manuscripts in Oxford Libraries. Medieval Academy Books, 81. Vol. I–II. Cambridge, MA.: Medieval Academy of America.
- Wilson, N. G., ed. (1975a). Scholia in Aristophanis Acharnenses. Scholia in Aristophanem, I.1b. Groningen: Bouma's Boekhuis B. V.
- Wilson, N. G., ed. (1975b). St Basil on the Value of Greek Literature. London: Duckworth.
- Russell, D. A.; Wilson, N. G., eds. (1981). Menander Rhetor. Oxford: Clarendon Press.
- Wilson, N. G. (1983). Scholars of Byzantium. London: Duckworth.
- Lloyd-Jones, H.; Wilson, N. G., eds. (1990a). Sophoclis fabulae. Oxford: Clarendon Press.
- Lloyd-Jones, H.; Wilson, N. G. (1990b). Sophoclea. Oxford: Clarendon Press.
- Wilson, N. G. (1992). From Byzantium to Italy: Greek Studies in the Italian Renaissance. London: Duckworth.
- Wilson, N. G., ed. (1994). Photius: the Bibliotheca. Bristol: Classical Press.
- Wilson, N. G., ed. (1997). Aelian: Historical Miscellany. Loeb Classical Library, 486. Cambridge, MA.: Harvard University Press.
- Lloyd-Jones, H.; Wilson, N. G. (1997). Sophocles: Second Thoughts. Hypomnemata, 100. Göttingen: Vandenhoeck & Ruprecht.
- Bembo, P. (2003). Wilson, N. G. (ed.). Oratio pro litteris graecis. Messina: Università—Centro Interdipartimentale di Studi Umanistici.
- Wilson, N. G., ed. (2007a). Aristophanis fabulae. Vol. I–II. Oxford: Clarendon Press.
- Wilson, N. G. (2007b). Aristophanea. Oxford: Clarendon Press.
- Netz, R.; Noel, W.; Tchernetska, N.; Wilson, N. G., eds. (2011). The Archimedes Palimpsest. Vol. I–II. Cambridge: University Press.
- Wilson, N. G. (2011). Brewer, D. S. (ed.). A Descriptive Catalogue of the Greek Manuscripts of Corpus Christi College, Oxford. Oxford: University Press. ISBN 9781843842873.
- Wilson, N. G., ed. (2015a). Herodoti historiae. Vol. I–II. Oxford: Clarendon Press.
- Wilson, N. G. (2015b). Herodotea. Oxford: University Press.
- Wilson, N. G., ed. (2016). Manutius: The Greek Classics. The «I Tatti» Renaissance Library, 70. Cambridge, MA.: Harvard University Press. ISBN 9780674088672.
- Wilson, N. G. (2023). "The Archimedes Palimpsest: Experiences of a Palaeographer". Graecolatina et Orientalia. 41–42: 223–231.
- Alpers, K.; Grusková, J; Wilson, N. G.; Bannert, H.; Primavesi, O. (2023a). "Aus den Untersuchungen zum Wiener Palimpsest des Grammatikers Herodian I: Prolegomena". Graecolatina et Orientalia. 41–42: 233–287.
- Alpers, K.; Grusková, J; Wilson, N. G.; Bannert, H.; Primavesi, O. (2023b). "Aus den Untersuchungen zum Wiener Palimpsest des Grammatikers Herodian I: Hdn. Vind. fr. Ia (fol. 6r), Zeilen 1–13, De prosodia catholica, Buch 5, Nomina auf -ιος". Graecolatina et Orientalia. 41–42: 289–342.
- Wilson, N. G. (2025a). "A Puzzle in the Manuscript Tradition of Polybius". The Classical Quarterly. 75 (1): 502–503. doi:10.1017/S0009838824001125.
- Wilson, N. G. (2025b). "Una nuova edizione della Biblioteca di Fozio". Νῆσος. 1: 226–231. doi:10.82073/NESOS0106_WILSON.
- Wilson, N. G., ed. (2026). Photii Bibliotheca. Vol. I. Oxford: University Press. ISBN 9780198866640.
