= Kurfess =

Kurfess is a surname. Notable people with the surname include:

- Alfons Kurfess (1889–1965), German classical philologist
- Charles Kurfess (1930–2024), American politician
