= Bertram Colgrave =

Irish medieval historian

Bertram Colgrave (1889, Derry, Ireland – 13 January 1968, Cambridge, England) was a medieval historian, antiquarian and archaeologist, specializing on the lives of the early saints in Anglo-Saxon England.

== Life ==
Colgrave's annotated translation of Bede's 7th century prose Life of St Cuthbert was published in 1940. Title page of 10th-century manuscript in British Library with animal heads and plant motifs in first illuminated letter.

Colgrave attended King Edward VI Camp Hill School for Boys in Birmingham, prior to undergraduate studies at the University of Birmingham. He went on to study for a second degree in Anglo-Saxon and Middle English at Clare College, Cambridge, teaching briefly at Merchiston Castle School near Edinburgh from 1916 to 1918. In 1920 he was appointed lecturer in English at Durham University, with a promotion to reader in 1930. He was attached to Hatfield College. He served as dean of the Faculty of Arts between 1933 and 1935 and was the first public orator of the university from 1939 to 1942. From 1950 to 1963 he was founding editor-in-chief of Early English Manuscripts in Facsimile. On his retirement from Durham University in 1954, he held visiting professorships at the University of North Carolina, University of Texas, University of Kansas, University of Colorado and Mount Holyoke College. He fully retired to Coton near Cambridge in 1965. Colgrave was a member of the Plymouth Brethren.

== Works ==
Colgrave specialized on the lives of St Cuthbert and the Venerable Bede. He prepared editions of the Latin lives of the early saints Wilfrid, Cuthbert, Guthlac and Gregory the Great. He was also a historian of the city and diocese of Durham, for which he wrote the official guide. In 1939 in the preface to his edition of Two Lives of Saint Cuthbert, dated "St. Cuthbert's Day" (20 March), Colgrave wrote, "To edit the two most important Lives of Cuthbert is almost a pious duty for one who lives under the shadow of Durham Cathedral."

== Honours ==
- Honorary D.Litt., Durham University, 1957.
- Israel Gollancz Memorial Lecture, 1958, British Academy
- Inaugural Jarrow Lecture, St Paul's Church, Jarrow, 1958.
- Fellow of the Mediaeval Academy of America, 1968.

== Selected bibliography ==
- Colgrave, Bertram; Rendle Short, Arthur J. (1921), The Historic Faith in the Light of Today, Marshall Bros
- Colgrave, Bertram (1958), The Earliest Saints' Lives Written in England, Oxford University Press
- Colgrave, Bertram (1965), St. Margaret's Church, Crossgate, Durham, British Publishing Company
- Colgrave, Bertram; Cramp, Rosemary (1969), St Peter's Church, Wearmouth, British Publishing Company
- Colgrave, Bertram (1985), Two Lives of St. Cuthbert, Cambridge University Press, ISBN 978-0-521-31385-8
- Colgrave, Bertram (1985), The Life of Bishop Wilfrid by Eddius Stephanus, Cambridge University Press, ISBN 978-0-521-31387-2
- Colgrave, Bertram (1985), Felix's Life of Saint Guthlac, Cambridge University Press, ISBN 978-0-521-31386-5
- Colgrave, Bertram (1985), The Earliest Life of Gregory the Great, Cambridge University Press, ISBN 978-0-521-31384-1
- Colgrave, Bertram; Mynors, R. A. B. (1992), Bede's ecclesiastical history of the English people, Oxford medieval texts (reprint ed.), Oxford University Press

== Sources ==
- Gibby, C. W. (1971), "Bertram Colgrave: an Obituary", Transactions of the Architectural and Archaeological Society of Durham and Northumberland: 109–12
- Higham, N. J. (2006), (Re-)reading Bede: the ecclesiastical history in context, Taylor & Francis, ISBN 0-415-35367-X
- Holmes, U.T.; Malone, K.; Whiting, B.J. (1969), "Memoirs of Fellows and Corresponding Fellows of the Mediaeval Academy of America; Bertram Colgrave", Speculum, 44: 526, doi:10.1017/s0038713400063193, JSTOR 2855550, S2CID 225089367
- "Obituary", The Lady Clare Magazine, Clare College, Cambridge: 69, 1968
