= Friends of Herculaneum Society =

The Herculaneum Society
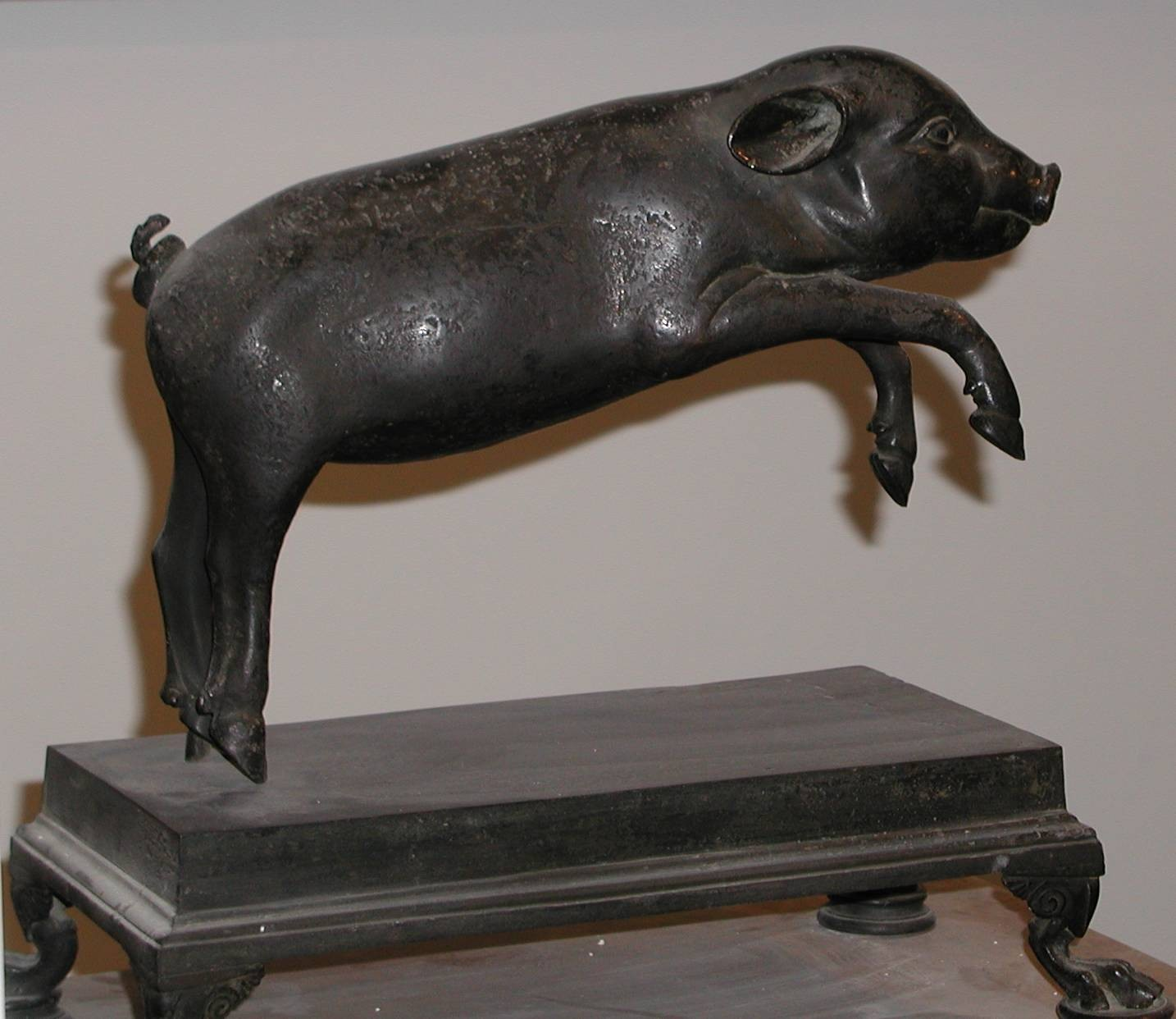
- Mascot of the Society; This famous piglet is among the bronzes discovered at the Villa of the Papyri in Herculaneum
- Formation: 2004
- Headquarters: Oxford, United Kingdom
- Trustees: Kay Byers, Alison Carter, Daniel Delattre, Gianluca Del Mastro, Holger Essler, Robert Fowler, Joy Littlewood, Annalisa Marzano, Carol Scott, Kate Starling, Nigel Wilson
- Website: http://www.herculaneum.ox.ac.uk

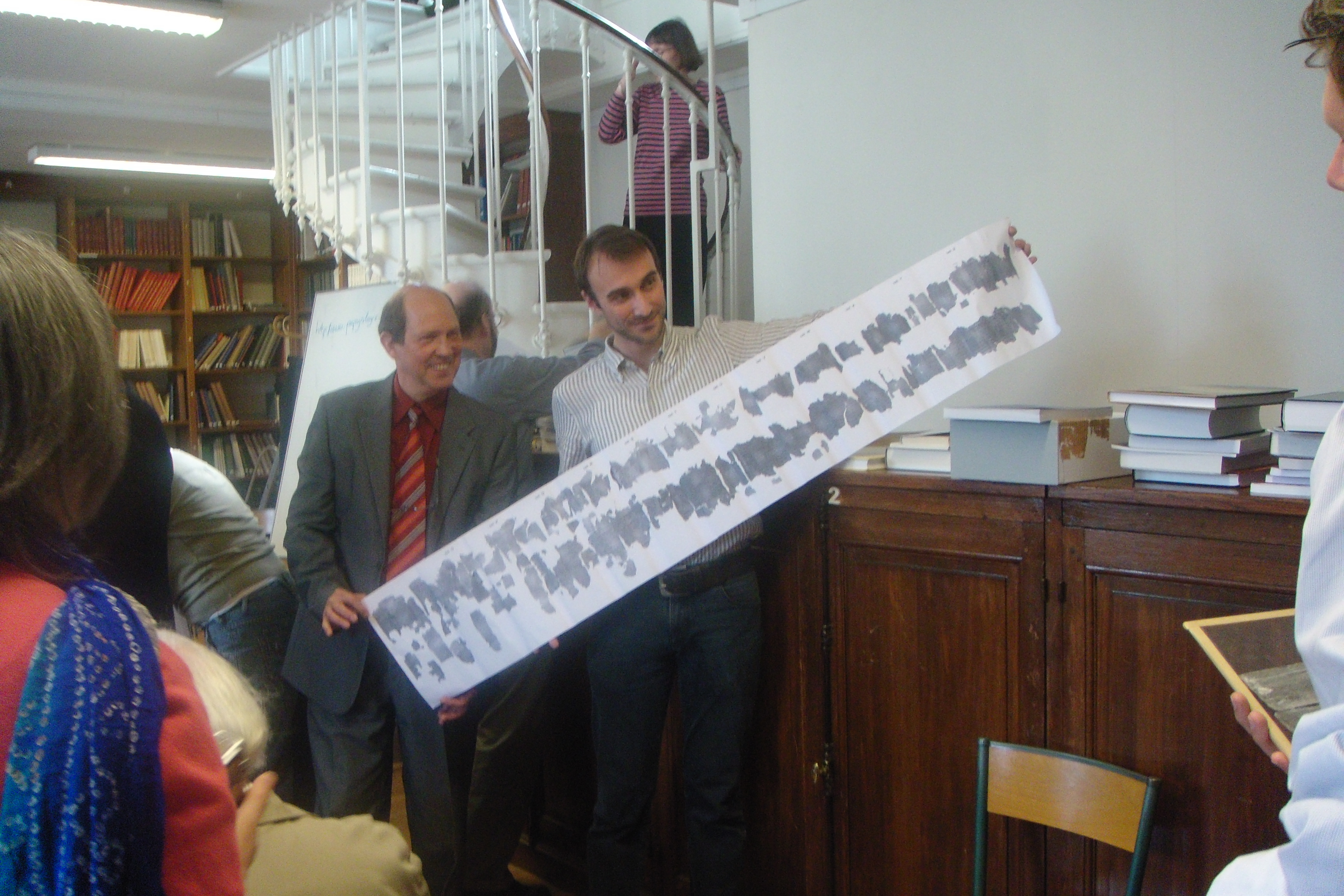
The Society's visit to the Sorbonne, Paris in 2009. This shows a sheet containing the assembled fragments from a burnt scroll found at the Villa of the Papyri and now in Paris.

The Friends of Herculaneum Society is a British association founded in 2004 to promote research into the archaeological site of Herculaneum at Ercolano, near Naples, Italy. Its headquarters are in the Ioannou Centre for Classical and Byzantine Studies in Oxford. It is registered as a charity and incorporated as a company under the name "The Herculaneum Society."

== Role and Interests ==
The Society's registered aims as a charity are:

- To advance to education of the public concerning the World Heritage Site of Herculaneum
- To promote research into Herculaneum
- To promote the conservation of the artefacts and buildings at Herculaneum.

The Society's members are particularly interested in the Villa of the Papyri and in the possibility of finding a hitherto unknown library or libraries in the unexcavated parts of that structure. More than 1800 Herculaneum papyri were discovered in Herculaneum in the 18th century, and it is hoped that many more may yet be discovered, including a Latin library containing hitherto lost classics.

Members of the Society come from all walks of life. Its membership is not exclusive to scholars as it includes all those interested in Herculaneum, the Villa of the Papyri, other Vesuvian sites and Ancient Rome in general.

- Every two years the Society organises a Congress at Herculaneum for its members incorporating talks by experts and visits to the ruins at Herculaneum and related sites
- The Society organises other meetings with talks and tours for members and non-members in Oxford and other locations in the UK (and 2009 in Paris)
- The Society offers financial support to students and scholars working on topics related to Herculaneum. For a list of past holders see here.
- The Society raises funds in support of work at Herculaneum. For the 2018 campaign in support of the Ancient Graffiti Project see here.
- The Society runs biennial competitions for schools
- An American Friends of Herculaneum Society has been established in New York City. See: http://herculaneumfriends.org

== Publications ==
- The Society's newsletter "Herculaneum Archaeology" is published once or twice yearly and is available to all members.
- The Society publishes a series called Sozomena: Studies in the Recovery of Ancient Texts. This is published on behalf of the Society by the distinguished publishing house Walter de Gruyter. The series editors are Alessandro Barchiesi, Robert Fowler, Lucia Prauscello and Nigel Wilson.

== Trustees ==
Ms Kay Byers, Ms Alison Carter, Dr. Gianluca Del Mastro (University of Campagna Luigi Vanvitelli), Dr Holger Essler (Julius-Maximilians-Universität Würzburg), Prof. Robert Fowler (University of Bristol), Dr. Joy Littlewood, Prof. Annalisa Marzano (Alma Mater Studiorum University of Bologna), Dr. Carol Scott, Ms Kate Starling, Mr. Nigel Wilson (University of Oxford)
