= Robert Fowler (academic) =

Canadian classicist (born 1954)

Robert Louis Herbert Fowler, FBA (born 19 May 1954) is a classicist and academic. He was Henry Overton Wills Professor of Greek at the University of Bristol between 1996 and 2017.

== Career ==
Born on 19 May 1954 at Palmerston, Ontario, Robert Louis Herbert Fowler attended the University of Toronto, graduating with a Bachelor of Arts degree in 1976 and Master of Arts degree the next year. He then completed his doctoral studies at Wadham College, Oxford; his DPhil was awarded in 1980 for his thesis "Aspects of style in early Greek lyric poetry". He was appointed to a post-doctoral fellowship at the Calgary Institute for the Humanities in 1980, and then joined the University of Waterloo as an assistant professor in 1981. He was promoted to associate professor five years later, and chaired the department from 1988 to 1996. He was appointed professor in 1994, before becoming Henry Overton Wills Professor of Greek at the University of Bristol in 1996. He was also Dean of Arts at Bristol from 2004 to 2009, and retired from his professorship in 2017, but remained on the faculty as an emeritus professor. He is one of the trustees of the Herculaneum Society, and an editor, with Alessandro Barchiesi, Lucia Prauscello and Nigel Wilson, of the series Sozomena, which is published for the Society by Walter de Gruyter.

== Awards and honours ==
In 2015, Fowler was elected a Fellow of the British Academy, the United Kingdom's national academy for the humanities and social sciences.

== Selected publications ==
- The Nature of Early Greek Lyric (University of Toronto Press, 1987). ISBN 978-1-487-59547-0
- Early Greek Mythography, 2 vols. (Oxford University Press, 2000, 2013). Vol. 1: ISBN 978-0-198-14740-4, Vol. 2: ISBN 978-0-198-14741-1
- (Editor) The Cambridge Companion to Homer (Cambridge University Press, 2004). ISBN 978-0-511-99893-5
- Pindar and the Sublime. Greek Myth, Reception, and Lyric Experience (Bloomsbury Academic, 2022). ISBN 978-1-350-19813-5
