= Charles Brink =

German-British classical scholar

Charles Oscar Brink
- Born: Karl Oskar Levy; 13 March 1907; Charlottenburg, German Empire
- Died: 2 March 1994 (aged 86); Cambridge, United Kingdom

Academic background
- Education: Humboldt University, Berlin
- Thesis: Stil und Form der pseudaristotelischen Magna Moralia
- Doctoral advisor: Werner Jaeger
- Influences: A. E. Housman · Richard Bentley · Ulrich von Wilamowitz-Moellendorff · Eduard Norden

Academic work
- Discipline: Classics
- Sub-discipline: Latin Literature
- Institutions: Liverpool University; Gonville and Caius College, Cambridge
- Main interests: Horace; Aristotle; Tacitus
- Notable works: Horace on Poetry

Charles Oscar Brink FBA (born Karl Oskar Levy; 13 March 1907 – 2 March 1994) was a German-Jewish classicist and Kennedy Professor of Latin at Cambridge University.

After an education and an early career as a lexicographer in Weimar Germany, Brink emigrated to the United Kingdom in 1938. After brief stints at several British universities, he was appointed to the prestigious Kennedy chair of Latin at Cambridge in 1954. In this role, he established himself as one of the foremost scholars of a generation of Jewish scholars who fled Germany during the Third Reich. Credited with bringing his intimacy with the conception of Alterumswissenschaften to Britain, Brink's principal academic achievement was a far ranging edition of Horace's theoretical work (three volumes of Horace on Poetry). He was a fellow of Gonville and Caius College.

== Education and early career ==
In 1907, Brink, then Karl Oskar Levy, was born into a secular Jewish family in Charlottenburg. His father, Arthur, was a legal professional who, in 1922, was appointed a notary. He attended the Lessing-Gymnasium in Berlin-Wedding, where he excelled more in the study of German literature and Philosophy than in the Classical languages. In 1925, he enrolled at Humboldt University of Berlin (known as Friedrich Whillhelm University at the time) to study Classical Philology under some of the most influential scholars of the time, including Werner Jaeger, Ulrich von Wilamowitz-Moellendorff and Eduard Norden. During a visit to Oriel College, Oxford, in 1928, Brink had the opportunity to familiarise himself with the British academia and the work of A. E. Housman. He obtained his doctorate in 1933 with a dissertation entitled Stil und Form der pseudaristotelischen Magna moralia. For the next five years he worked on the staff of the Thesaurus Linguae Latinae in Munich.

== Oxford, St. Andrews and Liverpool ==
In the aftermath of Adolf Hitler's seizure of power, Brink began to seek employment outside of Germany. Aided by W. D. Ross, he was able to secure a position with the Oxford Latin Dictionary and relocated to Oxford in 1938. In June 1940, Brink and his family were interned at Peel, Isle of Man, because of their German descent. After his release, he started working as a classics tutor at Magdalen College, Oxford, and later acted as classics master for the affiliated Magdalen College School. It was during his time at Oxford that he met Daphne Hope Harvey, whom he married in 1942. They had three sons.

In 1948, Brink accompanied fellow Oxford classicist T. E. Wright to an appointment at the University of St. Andrews. During his time in Scotland, his reputation as a classical scholar in Britain was much furthered by articles on Tacitus. He also began work on an edition of the philosophical works of Cicero. In 1951, Brink was appointed to the chair of Latin at the University of Liverpool. Though his tenure was to be a short one, he fostered a friendship with F. W. Walbank centred around the study of Polybius.

== Cambridge ==
After only three years at Liverpool, Brink was made Kennedy Professor of Latin at the University of Cambridge in 1954, a post he held until his retirement in 1974. He was elected to the fellowship of Gonville and Caius College and took an active role in the running of the college. At a time when verse and prose composition still occupied a central place in the study of the Classics, Brink became a leading voice for the shift towards literary critic modes of scholarship. His tenure as Kennedy Professor saw work on his magnum opus: a comprehensive study of Horace's work on poetry. It was published in three volumes, appearing in 1963, 1971 and 1982 respectively.

After his retirement, Brink remained an influential figure at Cambridge. He was involved in David Robinson's effort to establish a new college in the university and became a trustee of Robinson's donation. After the college received its royal charter in 1985, he was elected to an honorary fellowship. He also intended to bequeath to the college his vast personal library. The collection is now housed at the University of Tokyo after Robinson College declined the gift.

Brink died on March 2, 1994, in Cambridge, where he and his wife are commemorated in the Parish of the Ascension Burial Ground.

== Selected publications ==
- Horace on Poetry. Volume I: Prolegomena to the Literary Epistles, Cambridge, 1963.
- Horace on Poetry. Volume II: The Ars Poetica, Cambridge, 1971.
- Horace on Poetry. Volume III: The Letters to Augustus and Florus, Cambridge, 1982.
- English Classical Scholarship: Historical Reflections on Bentley, Porson, and Housman, Cambridge, 1986.

== Bibliography ==
- Cannadine, David, ed. (2004). Oxford Dictionary of National Biography. Oxford.
- Goldie, M. (2009). Churchill College Cambridge: The Guide. Cambridge.
- Jocelyn, H. D. (1997). "Charles Oscar Brink". Proceedings of the British Academy. 94: 319–354.
- Rubenstein, W. D.; Jolles, M.; Rubenstein, H. L. (2011). The Palgrave Dictionary of Anglo-Jewish History. Basingstoke.

Academic offices
Preceded by Roger Mynors	Kennedy Professor of Latin Cambridge University; 1954–74	Succeeded by E.J. Kenney
