= Colin William Macleod =

Scottish classical scholar (1943–1981)

- Born: 26 June 1943
- Died: 17 December 1981 (aged 38)
- Occupations: professor, author
- Writing career
- Genre: Classical literature

Colin William Macleod (26 June 1943 – 17 December 1981) was a Scottish classical scholar, educator and author. Macleod is known for his work on Gregory of Nyssa and mysticism in Plato, Plotinus and the Church Fathers as well as studies of Horace, Aischylos, Euripides and Homer.

== Professional background ==
At the early age of 16 Macleod in 1961 won a scholarship to study Literae Humaniores at Balliol College, Oxford. During his time as an undergraduate, he was influenced especially by Gordon Williams and Eduard Fraenkel. Despite winning a First in Honour Moderations Macleod did not achieve a First in Greats. In 1966 Macleod was elected to the prestigious Woodhouse Junior Research Fellowship at St John's College, Oxford, where he met Donald Russell who greatly influenced his methods and aims. In 1969 he became a student (fellow) and tutor of Christ Church, Oxford following John Gould.

== Personal ==
Macleod was married to Barbara Montagna.

He killed himself on 17 December 1981, 11 years after his mentor Fraenkel had also taken his own life.

== Published works ==
- Ανάλυσις: A Study in Ancient Mysticism. In: Journal of Theological Studies n.s. 21 (1970) 43–55. = Collected Essays, 292–304.
- Allegory and Mysticism in Origen and Gregory of Nyssa. In: Journal of Theological Studies n.s. 22 (1971) 362–379. = Collected Essays, 309–326.
- L’Unità dell’Orestea. In: Maia n.s. 25, 1973, 267–292.
- A Use of Myth in Ancient Poetry (Cat. 68; Hor. Od. 3.27; Theoc. 7; Prop. 3.15). In: Classical Quarterly n.s. 24 (1974) 82–93. = Collected Essays, 159–170.
- Euripides' Rags. In: ZPE 15 (1974) 221–222. = Collected Essays, 47–48.
- Callimachus, Virgil, Propertius, and Lollius (Horace, Epistles 1.18.39–66). In: ZPE 23 (1976) 41–43. = Collected Essays, 215–217.
- Bathos in 'Longinus' and Methodius. In: Journal of Theological Studies n.s. 27 (1976) 413–414. = Collected Essays, 327–328.
- The Poet, The Critic, and The Moralist: Horace, Epistles 1.19. In: Classical Quarterly n.s. 27 (1977) 359–376. = Collected Essays, 262–279.
- Horace and the Sibyl (Epode 16.2). In: Classical Quarterly n.s. 29 (1979) 220–221. = Collected Essays, 218–218.
- Horatian Imitatio and Odes 2.5. In: Creative Imitation and Latin Literature. Ed. by D. A. West and A. Woodman. Cambridge 1979, 89–102. = Collected Essays, 245–261.
- Ethics and Poetry in Horace's Odes (1.20; 2.3). In: Greece and Rome 26 (1979) 21–31. = Collected Essays, 225–235.
- The Poetry of Ethics: Horace, Epistles 1. In: Journal of Roman Studies 69 (1979) 16–27. = Collected Essays, 280–291.
- Euripides' Rags Again. In: ZPE 29 (1980) 6. = Collected Essays, 48.
- Ethics and Poetry in Horace's Odes: II (1.7; 2.9). In: Greece and Rome 28 (1981) 141–149. = Collected Essays, 236–244.
- Horace and His Lyric Models: A Note on Epode 9 and Odes 1,37. In: Hermes 110 (1982) 371–375. = Collected Essays, 220–224.
- The Preface to Gregory of Nyssa's Life of Moses. In: Journal of Theological Studies n.s. 33 (1982) 183–191. = Collected Essays, 329–337.
- Homer: Iliad, Book XXIV. Edited by C. W. MacLeod. Cambridge University Press, Cambridge 1982, ISBN 0-52124353-X, Google Bücher
- Collected Essays. Oxford University Press, Oxford, 1983.
