= Lucia Prauscello =

Classicist

- Years active: 1999-present

Lucia Prauscello is a Classicist who works on Greek Philology and Literature. She is a professor at the University of Oxford.

== Education ==
Prauscello completed her undergraduate degree at Pisa University in 1999, followed by a postgraduate degree at the Scuola Normale Superiore, Pisa in 2003.

== Career ==
Prauscello held a Junior Research Fellowship at the Scuola Normale Superiore, Pisa (from 2003 to 2004) followed by a Momigliano Fellowship in Arts at UCL from 2004 to 2006. In 2005, Prauscello was appointed as a University Lecturer, later Senior University Lecturer, at the University of Cambridge, and a Fellow and Director of Studies in Classics at Trinity Hall. From 2016 to 2018, she was a University Reader at the University of Cambridge, Faculty of Classics. In 2015, she held a Humboldt Fellowship at the Humboldt-Universität zu Berlin. Since 2018, she has been a Senior Research Fellow at All Souls College, University of Oxford.

Prauscello is on the editorial board of Sapienza Università Editrice, the Oxyrhynchus Papyri Management Committee, and since 2017 she is a co-editor of the Cambridge Classical Journal. She is an editor, with Alessandro Barchiesi, Robert Fowler and Nigel Wilson, of the series Sozomena, which is published for the Herculaneum Society by Walter de Gruyter.

== Selected publications ==
- 2006. Singing Alexandria: Music between Practice and Textual Transmission, Mnemosyne Supplement Series. Leiden and Boston: Brill.
- 2013. E. Bakola, L. Prauscello and M. Telò (eds.), Greek Comedy and the Discourse of Genres. Cambridge: Cambridge University Press.
- 2014. Hands and book-rolls in P.Oxy.4411: the first extant papyrus witness for Plato's Critias (= P.Oxy.4411 frr. 88-90 + 92 + 94–95)’, co-authored with G. Ucciardello. Zeitschrift für Papyrologie und Epigraphik 191: 47-58.
- 2013. Demeter and Dionysos in the sixth-century southern Argolid: Lasus of Hermione, the cult of Demeter Chthonia and the origins of dithyramb’, in B. Kowalzig and P. Wilson (eds.), Song Culture and Social Change: The Contexts of Dithyramb. Oxford: 76–92.
- 2014. Hands and book-rolls in P.Oxy.4411: the first extant papyrus witness for Plato's Critias (= P.Oxy.4411 frr. 88-90 + 92 + 94–95)’, co-authored with G. Ucciardello. Zeitschrift für Papyrologie und Epigraphik 191: 47-58.
- 2014. Performing Citizenship in Plato’s Laws. Cambridge: Cambridge University Press.
- 2015. Sappho, fr. 88 Voigt (P.Oxy.2290 + P.Oxy.4411): a re-appraisal’, co-authored with G. Ucciardello. Zeitschrift für Papyrologie und Epigraphik 195: 13–29.
- 2019. Themistocles’ philotimia in IEleusis 300 (= SEG 30.93) ll. 65-67: some linguistic observations. Zeitschrift für Papyrologie und Epigraphik.
