= W. B. Anderson =

Scottish classicist and academic (1877–1959)

William Blair Anderson (28 July 1877 – 9 December 1959) was a Scottish classicist and academic. Having been born in Aberdeen, Scotland, he studied at the University of Aberdeen and then Trinity College, Cambridge. He taught classics at the University of Aberdeen, the Victoria University of Manchester in England and Queen's University, Kingston in Canada. He was Hulme Professor of Latin at the Victoria University of Manchester from 1929 to 1936, and Kennedy Professor of Latin at the University of Cambridge from 1936 to 1942. During the First World War, he served with the Officer Training Corps and in the Military Intelligence Directorate. He was "one of the most eminent Latinists of his day".

Academic offices
Preceded by A. E. Housman	Kennedy Professor of Latin; University of Cambridge; 1936 to 1942	Succeeded by Roger Mynors
