= Kennedy Professor of Latin =

Chair at the University of Cambridge

The Kennedy Professorship of Latin is the senior professorship of Latin at the University of Cambridge.

In 1865, when Benjamin Hall Kennedy retired as headmaster of Shrewsbury School, his friends and former pupils created a fund with the intention of founding a chair in Latin to be named after him. Kennedy himself added £500 to the fund on the condition that the chair not be named after him. The professorship was thus created in 1869. In 1911, after Kennedy's death, the professorship was in fact renamed after him, with the consent of his family.

== Kennedy Professors ==
- Hugh Andrew Johnstone Munro (1869–1872)
- John Eyton Bickersteth Mayor (1872–1911)
- Alfred Edward Housman (1911–1936)
- William Blair Anderson (1936–1942)
- Roger Aubrey Baskerville Mynors (1944–1953)
- Charles Oscar Brink (1954–1974)
- Edward John Kenney (1974–1982)
- Michael David Reeve (1984–2006)
- Stephen Oakley (2007–2026)
- Christopher Whitton (2026–)

== See also ==
- Corpus Christi Professor of Latin, University of Oxford
- Giger Professor of Latin, Princeton University
- Professor of Latin, University College London
- Regius Professor of Greek, University of Cambridge
- Sather Professorship of Classical Literature, University of California, Berkeley
