= Alessandro Barchiesi =

Italian classical philologist

- Born: 1955 (age 70–71)

Academic background
- Education: Scuola Normale Superiore di Pisa

Academic work
- Discipline: Classics
- Sub-discipline: Latin Literature
- Institutions: University of Verona; University of Siena; Stanford University; New York University

Alessandro Barchiesi (born 1955) is an Italian classicist. A specialist on Latin poetry, he is best known for his work on Horace, Virgil and Ovid. Having spent the majority of his career in Italy and the United States, he has served as a professor of Classics at New York University since 2016.

== Career ==
Until 1987, Barchiesi was based at the Scuola Normale di Pisa, first as a student of Gian Biagio Conte and later as research fellow. He then became an associate professor at the University of Milan in 1987. In 1990, he was appointed to a tenured position at the University of Verona which he held for ten years. In 2000, Barchiesi moved to a professorship at the University of Siena at Arezzo. He held this position in parallel with a Spogli Professorship at the Stanford University. Since 2016, he works as a professor of Classics at NYU.

In addition to the above appointments, he has had visiting positions at various institutions, including Oxford, Harvard and Princeton. In 2010–11, he served in the prestigious role of Sather Professor of Classical Literature at the University of California, Berkeley. He is an editor, with Robert Fowler, Lucia Prauscello and Nigel Wilson, of the series Sozomena which is published for the Herculaneum Society by Walter de Gruyter.

== Selected publications ==
- Le Fenicie, Venice, 1988.
- The poet and the prince: Ovid and Augustan discourse, Berkeley, 1997
- Ovidian transformations: essays on the Metamorphoses and its reception, ed. with P. Hardie and S. Hinds, Cambridge, 1999
- Ovidio: Metamorfosi 1 (Libri I-II), Milan, 2005
- Ovidio: Metamorfosi 2 (Libri III-IV), Milan, 2007
- Homeric effects in Vergil’s narrative, Princeton, 2015
