= Stephen Oakley =

British classicist and academic (born 1958)

- Born: 20 November 1958 (age 67)

Academic background
- Education: Queens' College, Cambridge

Academic work
- Discipline: Classics
- Sub-discipline: Latin Literature
- Institutions: University of Reading; Emmanuel College, Cambridge
- Main interests: Livy

Stephen Phelps Oakley, FBA (born 20 November 1958) is a British classicist and academic. An expert on the work of Livy, he was the ninth Kennedy Professor of Latin at the University of Cambridge and is a Life Fellow of Emmanuel College.

== Early life and education ==
Oakley was born on 20 November 1958. He was educated at Bradfield College in Berkshire. He went on to study at Queens' College, Cambridge, where he graduated with a Bachelor of Arts (BA) degree in 1980 and a Doctor of Philosophy (PhD) degree in 1985.

== Academic career ==
From 1984, he worked at the university's Emmanuel College, first as a research fellow and, from 1986, as an official fellow. In 1998, he accepted a position at the University of Reading which he held until 2007. He then returned to Cambridge to succeed Michael Reeve as the Kennedy Professor of Latin. He retired in 2026, becoming a Life Fellow of Emmanuel College.

In 2024, he held the Lyell Readership in Bibliography at the University of Oxford, giving the associated Lyell Lectures on the transmission of Latin text.

== Bibliography ==
- The hill-forts of the Samnites (Archaeological Monographs of the British School at Rome, 10), British School at Rome, London, 1995.
- A Commentary on Livy: Books VI–X, Volume I, Introduction and Book VI, Oxford University Press, 1997.
- A Commentary on Livy: Books VI–X, Volume II, Books VI-VIII, Oxford University Press, 1998.
- A Commentary on Livy: Books VI–X, Volume III, Book IX, Oxford University Press, 2005.
- A Commentary on Livy: Books VI–X, Volume IV, Book X, Oxford University Press, 2005.

Academic offices
Preceded by Michael Reeve	Kennedy Professor of Latin Cambridge University; 2007–present	Succeeded by Christopher Whitton
