= Michael Reeve =

British Latinist (born 1943)

Michael Reeve FBA
- Born: Michael David Reeve; 11 January 1943 (age 83)

Academic background
- Education: Balliol College, Oxford

Academic work
- Discipline: Classics
- Sub-discipline: Textual criticism
- Institutions: Exeter College, Oxford; Pembroke College, Cambridge

Michael David Reeve FBA (11 January 1943) is a British classicist and professor emeritus at Cambridge University. One of the foremost textual scholars of his generation, he has published widely on the transmission of Latin and Greek texts. He was the eighth Kennedy Professor of Latin.

== Career ==
Reeve was educated at King Edward's School, Birmingham and went on to study at Balliol College, Oxford. He was appointed a lecturer at the University of Oxford and made a fellow of Exeter College, Oxford in 1966. He remained in this position until 1984, when he was appointed Kennedy Professor of Latin at Cambridge University. He also became a fellow of Pembroke College, Cambridge.

In 1984, he was elected a Fellow of the British Academy.

In 2006, Reeve retired from his teaching duties. In February 2014, Reeve was elected to the Accademia Ambrosiana (Veneranda Biblioteca Ambrosiana, Milan, Italy) in the Class of Greek and Latin Studies.

Reeve was the Sandars Reader in Bibliography in 2011-2012 speaking on "Printing the Latin Classics."

In 2017, he was elected 'Socio Straniero' (i.e. Foreign Fellow) of the Accademia Nazionale dei Lincei (Rome, Italy).

== Selected publications ==
- Longus, Daphnis et Chloe, Leipzig, Leipzig, B. G. Teubner (Bibliotheca Teubneriana), 1982 (2nd ed. Leipzig, B. G. Teubner (Bibliotheca Teubneriana), 1986; 3rd ed. München – Leipzig, K. G. Saur (Bibliotheca Teubneriana), 1994)
- M. Tullii Ciceronis Scripta quae manserunt omnia, 7: Oratio Pro P. Quinctio, Stuttgart – Leipzig, B. G. Teubner (Bibliotheca Teubneriana), 1992
- Vegetius, Epitoma rei militaris, Oxford, The Clarendon Press (Scriptorum classicorum bibliotheca Oxoniensis), 2004
- M. Tullii Ciceronis Scripta quae manserunt omnia, 24: Oratio de provinciis consularibus; Oratio pro L. Cornelio Balbo, Berlin – New York, W. De Gruyter (Bibliotheca Teubneriana), 2007 [ed. Tadeusz Maslowski, preface by M. D. Reeve]
- Geoffrey of Monmouth, The History of the Kings of Britain, with N. Wright, Woodbridge, Boydell and Brewer, 2007
- Manuscripts and Methods. Essays on Editing and Transmission, Roma, Edizioni di Storia e Letteratura (Storia e Letteratura, 270), 2011
- Reeve, Michael D. (2021). The Transmission of Pliny's Natural History. Sussidi Eruditi, 101. Rome: Edizioni di Storia e Letteratura. ISBN 9788893595582.

== Works cited ==
- Hunter, R. and Oakley, S. P. (2015) Latin Literature and its Transmission (Cambridge)

Academic offices
Preceded by E. J. Kenney	Kennedy Professor of Latin Cambridge University; 1984–2006	Succeeded by Stephen Oakley
