= Pseudo-Linus =

Author

Pseudo-Linus is the name given to the author of a fourth-century account of the martyrdom of Paul, the "Passio Sancti Pauli Apostoli".
