= Bryan Peter Reardon =

American classical philologist

Bryan Peter Reardon (December 30, 1928 – November 16, 2009) was the Chairman of the Department of Classics at the University of California, Irvine.

== Early life and education ==
Born in Manchester, England on December 30, 1928, Bryan Peter Reardon received his Master of Arts from the University of Glasgow in 1951. He earned his Bachelor's from St. John's College, Cambridge in 1953. He then received his PhD from Nantes University in 1968.

== Career ==
Reardon began his career as an associate professor at Memorial University Newfoundland, Canada, from 1958 until 1967. He was a professor at Trent University in Ontario, Canada, from 1967 until 1974. He became professor of classics at the University College of North Wales from 1974 until 1978, and served as Head of Department there. In 1978 Reardon moved to the United States in 1978 to become the chairman of the Department of Classics at the University of California, Irvine. He served in this position until 1983.

== Death ==
Reardon died at home in Lion-sur-Mer, Normandy, France on November 16, 2009.
