= David d'Avray =

British historian and academic

David d'Avray FBA FRHistS
- Born: 3 February 1952 (age 74); Lusaka, Zambia
- Occupations: Historian and academic
- Spouse: Julia Walworth (m. 1985)

Academic background
- Education: St Benedict's School, Ealing
- Alma mater: St John's College, Cambridge; Balliol College, Oxford
- Thesis: The transformation of the medieval sermon (1976)
- Doctoral advisor: Richard William Hunt

Academic work
- Discipline: History
- Sub-discipline: Middle Ages; History of Christianity; Legal history of the Catholic Church; Social history; Max Weber
- Institutions: LMU Munich; University College London; Jesus College, Oxford

David Levesley d'Avray FBA FRHistS (born 3 February 1952) is a British historian who specialises in the religious and social history of the Middle Ages. He is Emeritus Professor of History at University College London and Supernumerary Fellow in History at Jesus College, Oxford.

== Academic career ==
D'Avray was educated at St Benedict's School, Ealing before beginning his undergraduate studies at St John's College, Cambridge, matriculating in 1970. He completed his doctoral studies at Balliol College, Oxford, in 1976, where his supervisor was Richard William Hunt. He then spent a year as the Michael Foster Memorial Scholar at LMU Munich.

In 1977, d'Avray joined University College London as a lecturer in history. He was promoted to reader in history in 1993 and appointed professor of history in 1996, retiring in 2019. He returned to the University of Oxford as a supernumerary fellow in history at Jesus College in 2022. Since 2026, he has served as Jesus College's dean of degrees.

=== Research ===
D'Avray's early publications focused on medieval preaching as a form of mass communication and as evidence for popular attitudes to monarchy, death and marriage. The next defining theme of his research was the practical influence of symbolism on the social and legal history of marriage in the medieval period. He then moved on to exploring rationalities in history, comparatively and with reference to the Middle Ages, and his most recent published works have focused on the relationship between royal marriage and papal government.

Since 2003 d'Avray has served as a general editor of the Oxford Medieval Texts series at Oxford University Press, which aims to produce scholarly editions of Latin works of significance to medieval European culture. From 1996–2004 he was a member of the editorial board of the journal Reviews in History and has been a member of the editorial advisory board of German History since 2003. He chaired the Medieval Studies section of the British Academy from 2012–2014 and was a member of the editorial committee of its Auctores Britannici Medii Aevi (Medieval British Authors) series from 2005–2016.

=== Media work ===
D'Avray has previously written for The Guardian and The Spectator.

== Honours and awards ==
D'Avray was elected a Fellow of the Royal Historical Society (FRHistS) in 1991 and a Fellow of the British Academy (FBA) in 2005. Between 1996 and 1998 he held a British Academy Research Readership and in 1999 he won the Distinguished Teacher Award for the Faculty of Social and Historical Sciences at University College London. In 2012 he won a Provost's Teaching Award at UCL. In 2016 he was a Corresponding Fellow of the Medieval Academy of America.

== Personal life ==
D'Avray is married to Julia Walworth, Fellow Librarian at Merton College, Oxford.

== Bibliography ==
=== Books ===
- The Preaching of the Friars: Sermons Diffused from Paris before 1300 (Oxford: Oxford University Press, 1985)
- Death and the Prince: Memorial Preaching before 1350 (Oxford: Oxford University Press, 1994)
- Modern Questions about Medieval Sermons: Essays on Marriage, Death, History and Sanctity (Spoleto: Firenze, 1994) (co-edited with Nicole Bériou)
- Medieval Marriage Sermons: Mass Communication in a Culture without Print (Oxford: Oxford University Press, 2001)
- Medieval Marriage: Symbolism and Society (Oxford: Oxford University Press, 2005)
- Medieval Religious Rationalities: A Weberian Analysis (Cambridge: Cambridge University Press, 2010)
- Rationalities in History: A Weberian Essay in Comparison (Cambridge: Cambridge University Press, 2010)
- Dissolving Royal Marriages: A Documentary History, 860–1600 (Cambridge: Cambridge University Press, 2014)
- Papacy, Monarchy and Marriage, 860–1600 (Cambridge: Cambridge University Press, 2015)
- Papal Jurisprudence c.400: Sources of the Canon Law Tradition (Cambridge: Cambridge University Press, 2019)
- Papal Jurisprudence, 385–1234: Social Origins and Medieval Reception of Canon Law (Cambridge: Cambridge University Press, 2022)
- The Power of Protocol: Diplomatics and the Dynamics of Papal Government, c.400–c.1600 (Cambridge: Cambridge University Press, 2023)
- Debating Papal History, c.250–c.1300: Responsive Government and the Medieval Papacy (Cambridge: Cambridge University Press, 2025)

=== Journal articles ===
- 'Marriage Sermons in Ad Status Collections of the Central Middle Ages' (with Martin Tausche), Archives d'Histoire Doctrinale et Littéraire du Moyen-âge 47 (1980), pp. 71–119
- 'Another Friar and Antiquity', Studies in Church History 17 (1981), pp. 49–58
- 'The Gospel of the Marriage Feast of Cana and Marriage Preaching in France', Studies in Church History Subsidia 4 (1985), pp. 207–224
- 'The Comparative Study of Memorial Preaching', Transactions of the Royal Historical Society 40 (1990), pp. 25–42
- 'Papal Authority and Religious Sentiment in the Late Middle Ages', Studies in Church History Subsidia 9 (1991), pp. 409–428
- 'Popular and Elite Religion: Feastdays and Preaching', Studies in Church History 42 (2006), pp. 162–179
- 'Ideal-Types and the Medieval Church', The Mediaeval Journal 1 (2011), pp. 1–22
- 'Kinship and Religion in the Early Middle Ages', Early Medieval Europe 20:2 (2012), pp. 195–212
- 'Stages of Papal Law', Journal of the British Academy 5 (2017), pp. 37–59
- 'Half a Century of Research on the First Papal Decretals (to c.400)', Bulletin of Medieval Canon Law 35:1 (2018), pp. 331–374
- 'A Weberian Approach to the History of Ethics: Aquinas and Kent', History of European Ideas 44:8 (2018), pp. 1003–1018
- 'Authenticating Marriage: The Decree Tametsi in a Comparative Global Perspective' (with Werner Menski), Rechtsgeschichte 27 (2019), pp. 71–89

=== Book chapters ===
- 'Peter Damian, Consanguinity and Church Property', in Lesley Smith and Benedicta Ward, eds., Intellectual Life in the Middle Ages: Essays Presented to Margaret Gibson (London: Hambledon Press, 1992), pp. 71–80
- 'Christendom: Medieval Christianity', in Peter Byrne and Leslie Houlden, eds., Companion Encyclopedia of Theology (London and New York: Routledge, 1995), pp. 206–229
- 'Symbolism and Medieval Religious Thought', in Peter Linehan, Janet Nelson and Marios Costambeys, eds., The Medieval World (London and New York: Routledge, 2001), pp. 267–278
- 'Comparative History of the Medieval Church's Marriage System', in Michael Borgolte, ed., Das europäische Mittelalter im Spannungsbogen des Vergleichs (Berlin: Akademie Verlag, 2001), pp. 209–222
- 'Max Weber and Comparative Legal History', in Andrew Lewis and Michael Lobban, eds., Law and History: Current Legal Issues 2003 Volume 6 (Oxford: Oxford University Press, 2004), pp. 189–199
- 'Printing, Mass Communication and Religious Reformation: The Middle Ages and After', in Julia Crick and Alexandra Walsham, eds., The Uses of Script and Print, 1300–1700 (Cambridge: Cambridge University Press, 2004), pp. 50–70
- 'Thirteenth-Century Marriage Preaching in Context', in Volker Mertens, Hans-Jochen Schiewer, Regina Dorothea Schiewer and Wolfram Schneider-Lastin, eds., Predigt im Kontext (Berlin: De Gruyter, 2008), pp. 147–154
- 'Annulment of Henry III's "Marriage" to Joan of Ponthieu Confirmed by Innocent IV on 20 May 1254', in Miri Rubin, ed., Medieval Christianity in Practice (Princeton: Princeton University Press, 2009), pp. 42–52
- 'Contamination, Stemmatics and the Editing of Medieval Latin Texts', in Alessandra Bucossi and Erin Kihlman, eds., Ars Endi Lecture Series: Volume II (Stockholm: Stockholm University Press, 2012) pp. 63–82
- 'The Cathars from Non-Catholic Sources', in Antonio Sennis, ed., Cathars in Question (Woodbridge: Boydell & Brewer, 2016), pp. 177–184
- 'The Concept of Magic', in Catherine Rider and Sophie Page, eds., The Routledge History of Medieval Magic (London and New York: Routledge, 2019), pp. 48–56
- 'Rationalities and Rationalization', in Alan Sica, ed., The Routledge International Handbook on Max Weber (London and New York: Routledge, 2022), pp. 63–75
- 'Methodological Individualism in Weber's Sociology of Religion', in Nathalie Bulle and Francesco Di Iorio, eds., The Palgrave Handbook of Methodological Individualism, Volume II (Cham: Palgrave Macmillan, 2023), pp. 249–270
