= Alfons Kurfess =

German classical philologist (1889–1965)

Alfons Kurfess (22 June 1889–17 September 1965) was a German classical philologist. Much of his work was on the Roman historian and author Sallust. He worked as a gymnasium (German secondary school) teacher and headmaster at several gymnasiums in Germany.

== Biography ==
Alfons Kurfess was born in 1889 in Göllsdorf near Rottweil to the elementary school teacher Anton Kurfess. He attended the Königliche Gymnasium in Rottweil and graduated in July 1908. He then studied classical philology at the University of Berlin from October 1908 to July 1912. He was certified in Latin, Greek, and Hebrew. In 1913, he obtained his doctorate of philology. He took a seminar year from April 1913 to March 1914 teaching at the Königlichen evangelischen Gymnasium in Glogau (modern Głogów), then a year at the Gymnasium in Wohlau (modern Wołów) from April 1914–March 1915. When the First World War broke out, he was initially deferred for the military draft. In April 1915, with the expiry of his teaching term, he was called up to serve.

Kurfess survived the war. After his return, Kurfess received a permanent position as a teacher at the Kaiserin-Augusta-Gymnasium in Berlin-Charlottenburg in April 1919. He worked there for ten years. In addition to teaching, he continued his research work and worked on editions of Latin writers designed for educational use in schools.

Kurfess then changed his employer a number of times. In April 1928, Kurfess became headmaster (director of studies) at Staatliche Gymnasium in Sigmaringen in Württemberg. In April 1932, he switched to working at the Staatliche Gymnasium in Münstereifel; in December 1933, he went to the Gymnasium in Linz am Rhein. After the end of World War II he retired and moved to Neu-Oelsburg near Peine in Lower Saxony. Later he moved to Hildesheim, where he died on 17 September 1965 at the age of 76.

== Work ==
Kurfess studied the writings of Roman historian Sallust from the time he was a student. His first works concerned some lesser writings of unclear provenance that are traditionally attributed to Sallust; Kurfess summarized under the name Appendix Sallustiana. He published critical editions of these individual writings in the 1920s. In the period after World War II he published a revised edition of these. He also published a critical edition of Sallust's larger histories and writings. Kurfess' two-part Sallust edition was reprinted several times and remained authoritative for a long time. It was most recently revised in 1991 by L. D. Reynolds, who published a new edition.

Other points of his research were Roman poets and the Church Fathers. Kurfess wrote several essays and articles for the Realencyclopädie der classischen Altertumswissenschaft (usually abbreviated Pauly–Wissowa, an extensive encyclopedia of works of the Greco-Roman classics) as well as the Reallexikon für Antike und Christentum (an encyclopedia of early Christianity). He also wrote translations and adaptations of a number of medieval Latin liturgical hymns.

A partial list of his scholarly work (not including his work written for schoolchildren) includes:

- De Sallustii in Ciceronem et invicem invectivis. Berlin 1913 (Dissertation)
- Sallustii in Ciceronem et invicem invectivae. Recensuit Alphonsus Kurfess. Leipzig 1914
- Die Invektivenpoesie der sullanisch-cäsarischen, augusteischen und nachaugusteischen Zeit. Ein Beitrag zur Geschichte der Invektive. Wohlau 1915 (Schulprogramm)
- C. Sallusti Crispi Epistulae ad Caesarem senem de re publica. Leipzig 1921
- Sallusts Invective gegen Cicero. Ein Pamphlet aus dem Jahre 54 v. Chr. Text mit ausgewähltem kritischen Apparat, zahlreichen Parallelstellen und deutscher Uebersetzung. Berlin-Charlottenburg 1927
- C. Sallusti Crispi Epistulae ad Caesarem senem de re publica. Leipzig 1930
- Festgabe, Herrn Geheimrat Professor Dr. Peter Meyer, früherem Direktor des St. Michael-Gymnasiums zu Muenstereifel zum 80. Geburtstag 7. 2. 1933 überreicht. Münstereifel 1933
- Sibyllinische Weissagungen. Urtext und Übersetzung. München 1951
- C. Sallusti Crispi Catilina, Iugurtha, fragmenta ampliora. Post A. W. Ahlberg edidit Alphonsus Kurfess. 2. Auflage, Leipzig 1954. 3. Auflage 1957. Zahlreiche Nachdrucke bis 1991
- Appendix Sallustiana. Two volumes, Leipzig 1950–1970
  - Volume 1: Epistulae ad Caesarem senem de re publica. 3. Auflage 1950. 4. Auflage 1955. 5. Auflage 1962. 7., unveränderte Auflage 1970
  - Volume 2: (Sallusti) in Ciceronem et invicem invectivae. 2. Auflage 1950. 3. Auflage 1958. 4. Auflage 1962. 5., unveränderte Auflage 1970
  - Later updated by L. D. Reynolds in 1991 Oxford edition of Appendix Sallustiana
