= Richard William Hunt =

British educator and medievalist

Richard William Hunt FBA
- Born: 11 April 1908; Spondon, Derbyshire, England
- Died: 13 November 1979 (aged 71); Oxford, Oxfordshire, England
- Occupations: Medieval scholar and palaeographer
- Spouse(s): Edith Twamley (m. 1939; died 1940) Katharine Rowland (m. 1942; died 1977)
- Children: 3, including Tim

Academic background
- Education: Haileybury and Imperial Service College
- Alma mater: Balliol College, Oxford; Christ Church, Oxford
- Doctoral advisor: Maurice Powicke

Academic work
- Institutions: University of Liverpool; Bodleian Library; Balliol College, Oxford
- Doctoral students: David d'Avray

Richard William Hunt (11 April 1908 – 13 November 1979) was a scholar, grammarian, palaeographer, editor, and author of a number of books about medieval history. He began his career as a lecturer in palaeography at Liverpool University, and worked at Bush House during World War II. In 1945 he obtained the position of Keeper of the Western Manuscripts at the Bodleian Library, and he relocated to Oxford, remaining in the position until 1975. During his tenure as keeper he held a fellowship at his alma mater, Balliol College, Oxford.

On 11 December 1939 he married Edith Irene Joyce Twamley at Spondon. She died from complications of pregnancy on 7 December 1940. On 14 February 1942 Hunt remarried to Katharine (Kit) Eva Rowland (1913/14–1977), daughter of timber merchant Harry Rowland of Parkgate, Cheshire. Three sons were born to them, including Tim Hunt.

On Hunt's retirement from the Bodleian in 1975, he was honoured with an Oxford exhibition, The Survival of Ancient Literature, as well as a collection of essays. His death in 1979 was marked by a second major exhibition, Manuscripts at Oxford.

== Bibliography ==
- List of Phillipps Manuscripts in the Bodleian Library (Oxford: Oxford University Press, 1957)
- Studies in the Book Trade in Honour of Graham Pollard, ed. with I. G. Philip and R. J. Roberts (Oxford: Oxford Bibliographical Society, 1975)
- The History of Grammar in the Middle Ages: Collected Papers, ed. G. L. Bursill-Hall (Amsterdam: John Benjamins Publishing Company, 1980)
