= Donald Russell (classicist) =

British classical philologist (1920–2020)

- Born: 13 October 1920
- Died: 9 February 2020 (aged 99)
- Occupation: academic
- Writing career
- Genre: Classical literature

Donald Andrew Frank Moore Russell, FBA (13 October 1920 – 9 February 2020) was a British classicist and academic. He was Professor of Classical Literature at the University of Oxford between 1985 and 1988, and a fellow and tutor of classics at St John's College, Oxford, from 1948 to 1988: he was an emeritus professor and emeritus fellow. Russell died in February 2020 at the age of 99.

== Early life and education ==
Russell was born on 13 October 1920 in Wandsworth, London, England. His parents were Samuel Charles Russell (1878–1979) and Laura Moore (1876–1966), both school teachers, who had married in 1912. His father saw service during the First World War in the Royal Flying Corps.

Russell was educated at King's College School, a private school in Wimbledon, London. In December 1938, he was awarded a scholarship to study classics at Balliol College, Oxford. His college tutors were W. S. Watt and Roger Mynors. He took Honour Moderations in June 1940, and then studied ancient history and philosophy as part of Greats from 1940 to 1941. His studies were interrupted when he was called-up for military service.

== Wartime service ==
Russell served in the British Army during the Second World War: first in the Royal Corps of Signals from 1941 to 1943, then in the Intelligence Corps from 1943 to 1945. In the Signals, he trained as a wireless operator. In 1943, he transferred to the Intelligence Corps and was sent on a crash course in Japanese at the secret Bedford Japanese School run by Captain Oswald Tuck RN. He was on the 3rd Bedford course (January to April 1943) and achieved the best results in the final examination. He was subsequently posted to the Japanese Military Attaché Section at Bletchley Park and became Senior Translator there. Having achieved the rank of lance corporal in the other ranks, he was granted an immediate emergency commission in the Intelligence Corps on 3 May 1944 in the rank of second lieutenant.

== Academic career ==
From 1948 to 1988, he was a Fellow of St John's College, Oxford, of which he was subsequently an emeritus fellow. As of October 2013, Russell was just the third fellow in the history of St John's to have reached the 65 year anniversary milestone of his election to the fellowship. From 1952 to 1978, he was a university lecturer in classical literature at the University of Oxford. He was Reader in Classical Literature from 1978 to 1985, and Professor of Classical Literature from 1985 to 1988.

In 1981, he delivered the J H Gray Lectures at the University of Cambridge. He was a visiting professor at the University of North Carolina in 1985 and from 1989 to 1991, a visiting professor at Stanford University.

His doctoral students included Richard Rutherford.

== Published works ==
- Russell, Donald (1964). Longinus On the Sublime, Oxford: Clarendon Press.
- Russell, Donald (1972). Plutarch, London: Duckworth.
- Russell, Donald; and M Winterbottom (1972). Ancient Literary Criticism, Oxford University Press.
- Russell, Donald (1981). Criticism in Antiquity, London: Duckworth.
- Russell, Donald; and N G Wilson (1981). Menander Rhetor, London: Duckworth.
- Russell, Donald (1983). Greek Declamation, Cambridge University Press.
- Russell, Donald (1990). Anthology of Latin Prose, Oxford: Clarendon Press.
- Russell, Donald (1991). Anthology of Greek Prose, Oxford: Clarendon Press.
- Russell, Donald (1992). Dio Chrysostom, Orations 7, 12, 36, Cambridge University Press.
- Russell, Donald (1993). Plutarch: Selected Essays and Dialogues, Oxford University Press.
- Russell, Donald (1996). Libanius: Imaginary Speeches, London: Duckworth.
- Russell, Donald (2001). Quintilian: The orator’s education (Loeb Translation), Harvard University Press.
- Russell, Donald; and D Konstan (2005). Heraclitus: Homeric problems, Atlanta: Society of Biblical Literature.
- Russell, Donald; and R Hunter (2011). Plutarch: How to Study Poetry, Cambridge University Press.
- Russell, Donald; Dillon, J and Gertz, S (2012). Aeneas of Gaza: Theophrastus with Zacharias of Mytilene: Ammonius (Ancient Commentators on Aristotle), Bristol Classical Press. 978-1780932095
