= E. J. Kenney =

British Latinist (1924–2019)

E. J. Kenney FBA
- Born: Edward John Kenney; 29 February 1924
- Died: 23 December 2019 (aged 95)

Academic background
- Education: Christ's Hospital; Trinity College, Cambridge

Academic work
- Discipline: Classics
- Sub-discipline: Latin Literature; Textual Criticism
- Institutions: Peterhouse, Cambridge
- Main interests: Ovid; Lucretius

Edward John Kenney FBA (29 February 1924 – 23 December 2019), usually known as E. J. Kenney, was a British Latinist who served as the Kennedy Professor of Latin until his retirement in 1984. Specialising in transmission and textual criticism, he was considered a leading expert on the work of Ovid and Lucretius. He spent the majority of his career at Cambridge University, where he was an emeritus fellow of Peterhouse until his death in 2019.

== Biography ==
Kenney was educated at Christ's Hospital in Horsham, West Sussex. During the Second World War, he served in the Royal Corps of Signals in Britain and India. He then went on to read classics at Trinity College, Cambridge, and was awarded a BA in 1949.

After a brief spell as assistant lecturer at the University of Leeds, Kenney returned to Cambridge, first as a research fellow at Trinity College and from 1953 as a fellow of Peterhouse. In 1974, he was named the seventh Kennedy Professor of Latin, an appointment which he held until his retirement in 1982.

In addition to his post at Cambridge, Kenney has held visiting positions at Harvard and Berkeley. From 1959 to 1965 he served as the editor of Classical Quarterly, while the British Academy elected him to a fellowship in 1968. He was elected foreign member of the Royal Netherlands Academy of Arts and Sciences in 1976. In 1979, he wrote a Latin poem, parodying the first-century CE poet Ovid, on the centenary of the Hellenic Society, a British learned society specialising in classical studies.

He was known for his exacting but constructive criticism. When interviewing candidates for admittance to the college, he would assess them using the "Fufu test". His pet cat Fufu would be on the candidate's chair and they would be judged by the manner in which they treated it. The more kindly they treated the cat, the more likely they were to be admitted.

== Selected publications ==
- P.Ovidi Nasonis: Amores; Medicamina Faciei Femineae; Ars Amatoria; Remedia Amoris, Oxford, 1961.
- Ovidiana Graeca, with P. E. Easterling, Cambridge Philological Society, 1965.
- Lucretius: De Rerum Natura III, Cambridge, 1971, 2014².
- The Cambridge History of Classical Literature II: Latin Literature, (ed.) with W. V. Clausen, Cambridge, 1982.
- Apuleius: Amor and Psyche, Cambridge, 1990.

Academic offices
Preceded by C.O. Brink	Kennedy Professor of Latin Cambridge University; 1974–1982	Succeeded by Michael Reeve
