= Delphic Festival =

Delphic Festival can refer to a festival held by Angelos Sikelianos and Eva Palmer-Sikelianos as part of their general effort towards the revival of the Delphic Idea.

- First Delphic Festival (1927),
- Second Delphic Festival (1930).
