= Athanasios Veloudios =

Greek actor and soldier (1895–1992)

Athanasios Veloudios (Greek: Αθανάσιος Βελούδιος; 1895–1992) was a Greek military officer, actor and writer.

== Biography ==
Veloudios was born in Athens in 1895. He took part in World War I and the Greco-Turkish war of 1919 – 1922. After his retirement from army ( 1934 ), he became an actor. In 1927, Veloudios was invited by Eva Palmer-Sikelianos to present the "Ancient Greek pyrrhic dance" at the Delphic Festival of 1927. She also asked him to be "a choreographer and to maintain the right rhythm" ("I was maintaining the rhythm on my own, with a drum," he writes in a text) and also teach the steps and the kinesiology of the ancient war dance to young people (teenagers, members of the "City Scouts" and "Soldiers that I "'borrowed" from the Royal Hellenic Army, "as Veloudios remembers regarding the participants in the dance groups). The initial success of the first "Amphictyony" (as he is referring to them, incorrectly remembering – in one case- 1928 as their chronology) of Angelos Sikelianos led to the resumption of the teaching and presentation of the pyrrhic dance in 1930 by him.
