= Asmus Jacob Carstens =

German painter

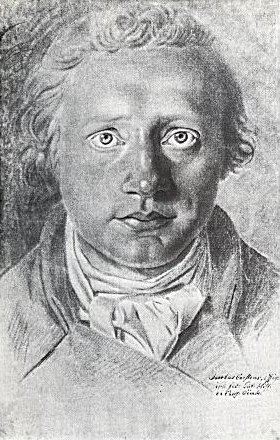
Self-portrait (1784)

Asmus Jacob Carstens (or "Jakob", May 10, 1754 – May 25, 1798) was a Danish-German painter, one of the most committed artists of German Neoclassicism. His career was erratic, partly because of his difficult personality, and the majority of his large projects were left incomplete, or subsequently destroyed. Much of what survives is in the form of drawings, many using "a schematic, pale colouring as a timid and humble accessory to the dominating figure-drawing", that were planned for large fresco commissions that never materialized.

== Biography ==
He was born in Sanct Jürgen near Schleswig to a miller. At the time this was part of Denmark–Norway. He had a youthful passion for painting, but was apprenticed to a cooper (barrel-maker) for five years. After quitting his master in 1776, he went to Copenhagen, where he studied at the academy and supported himself for seven years by drawing portraits in red chalk, producing during the time a large historical picture, the "Death of Æschylus", and another painting, "Æolus and Ulysses". In 1783 he went to Italy where he was much impressed by the work of Giulio Romano. His means did not permit him to go beyond Milan and Mantua, where he remained a month and then went to Lübeck, where he lived five years painting portraits.

He was then introduced by the poet Overbeck to a wealthy patron, by whose aid he went to Berlin, where his "Fall of the Angels", a colossal picture containing over 200 figures, gained him a professorship in the academy of fine arts. Two years' labour in Berlin and a travelling pension enabled him in 1792 to go to Rome, and study the works of Michelangelo and Raphael. At the end of this time he made a strongly worded attack on the Prussian academy and was dismissed; he was based in Rome for the brief remainder of his life, where he developed his final style.

He gradually produced some fine subject and historical paintings, e.g. "Plato's Symposium" and the "Battle of Rossbach" which made him famous. He was appointed professor at Berlin, and in 1795 a great exhibition of his works was held in Rome in the studio of Pompeo Batoni; he died in Rome in 1798. He mostly designed in pencil or chalk and watercolour and painted paintings in fresco; he rarely painted in oil.

A biography was published in 1806 by his friend, the critic and archaeologist Karl Ludwig Fernow, who was later the royal librarian at Weimar, which has the best collection of his graphic work. Bertel Thorvaldsen and Joseph Anton Koch both studied and worked with him in Rome, and copied many of his works; Koch made etchings of several, which were published in Rome in 1799. The Thorvaldsens Museum has several works by all three artists based on Carstens' designs.

== Contribution to German Romanticism ==
Although Asmus Jacob Carstens (1754–1798) is primarily known for his role in the Neoclassical movement, recent scholarship has begun to reassess his contributions to the emergence of German Romanticism. In 2021, an authenticated oil painting by Carstens, dated 1789, was discovered in Aarhus, Denmark. The painting depicts a young woman gazing into the distance with a dog at her feet, set against a dark background with dramatic chiaroscuro lighting. The emotional depth, poetic symbolism, and introspective tone evident in the work align closely with the early Romantic sensibility.

Experts at the National Gallery of Denmark (Statens Museum for Kunst), Bruun Rasmussen Auctioneers, and the ARoS Museum in Aarhus confirmed the attribution. The painting was later prominently exhibited at the ARoS Museum. Scholars have noted that the composition’s emotive qualities and symbolic introspection reflect a break from the formal idealism of Neoclassicism and suggest Carstens’ engagement with themes central to early Romanticism.

This discovery has prompted a re-evaluation of Carstens as a possible transitional figure whose work anticipated elements later seen in the paintings of Caspar David Friedrich and Philipp Otto Runge. While Carstens is typically celebrated for his masterful drawings and classical motifs, this Romantic-leaning composition reveals a more complex artistic profile that bridges Neoclassical rigor and Romantic subjectivity. As such, Carstens may be seen not only as a representative of Enlightenment aesthetics, but also as a forerunner of the emotional and symbolic language that defined early 19th-century German art.

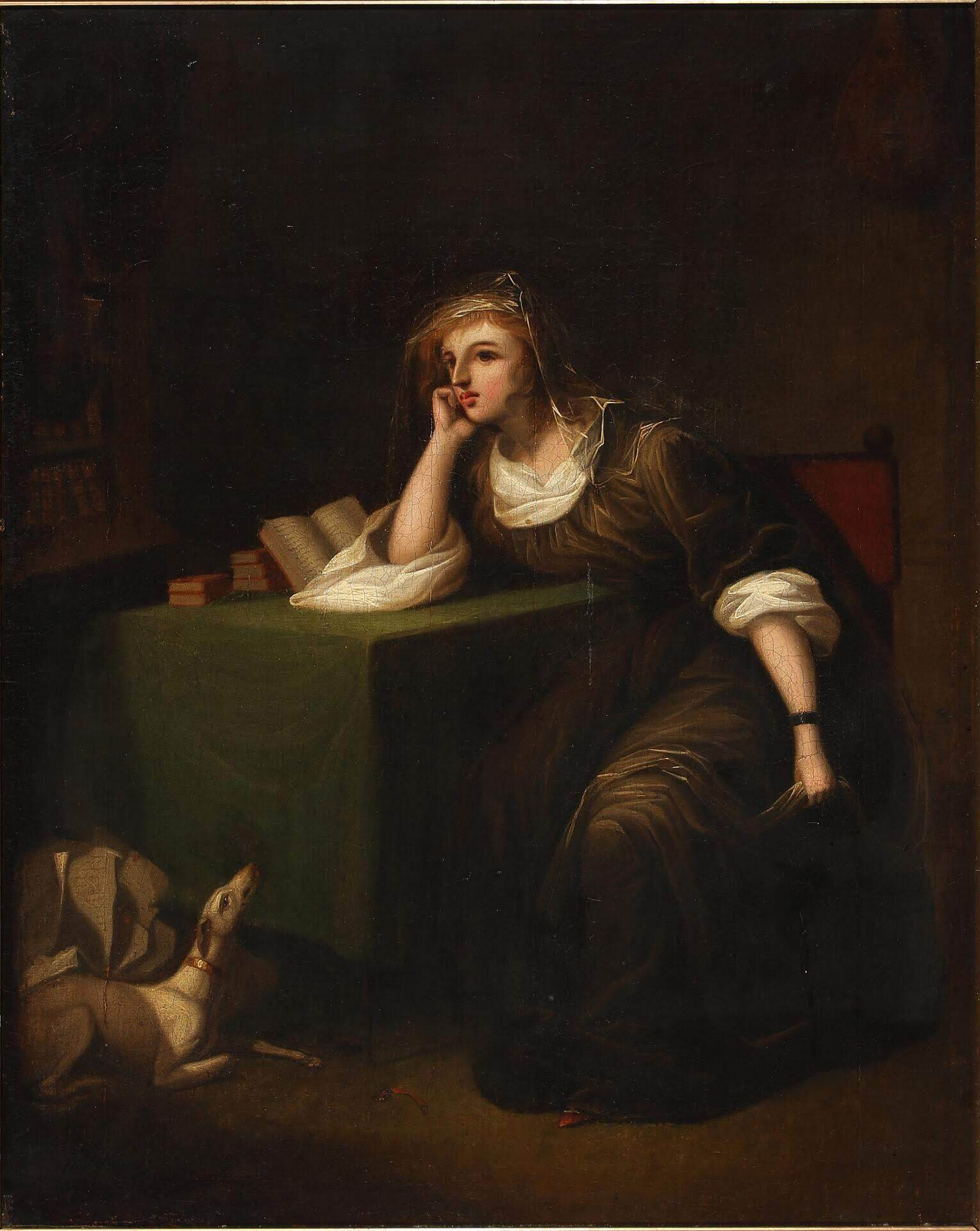
1789 Oil Painting by Amus Jacob Carstens; Early German Romantic

== Selected works ==
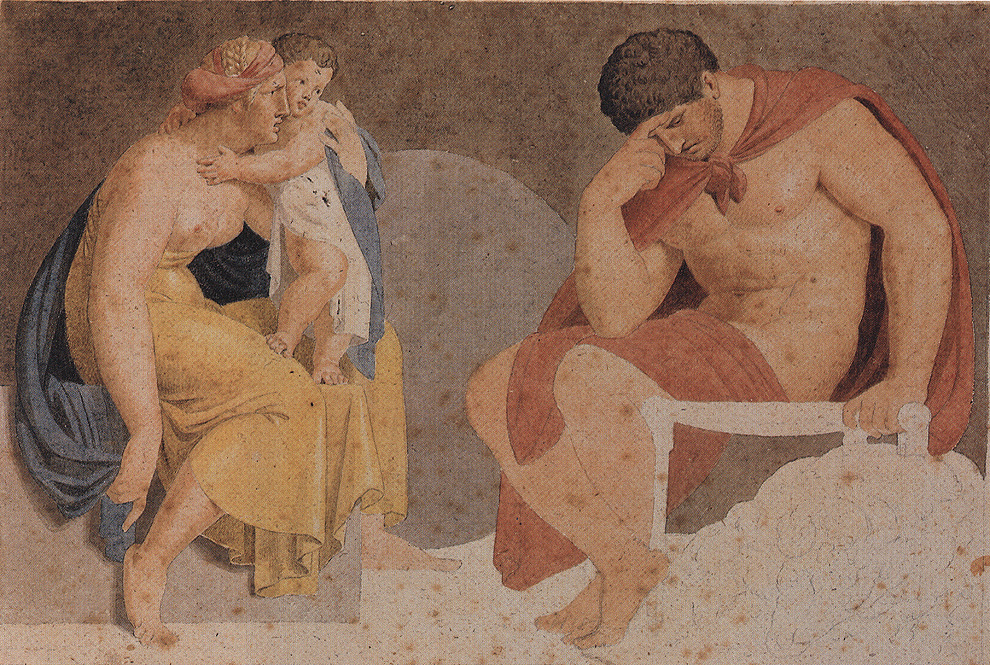
Sorrowful Ajax with Tecmessa and Eurysaces, 1791

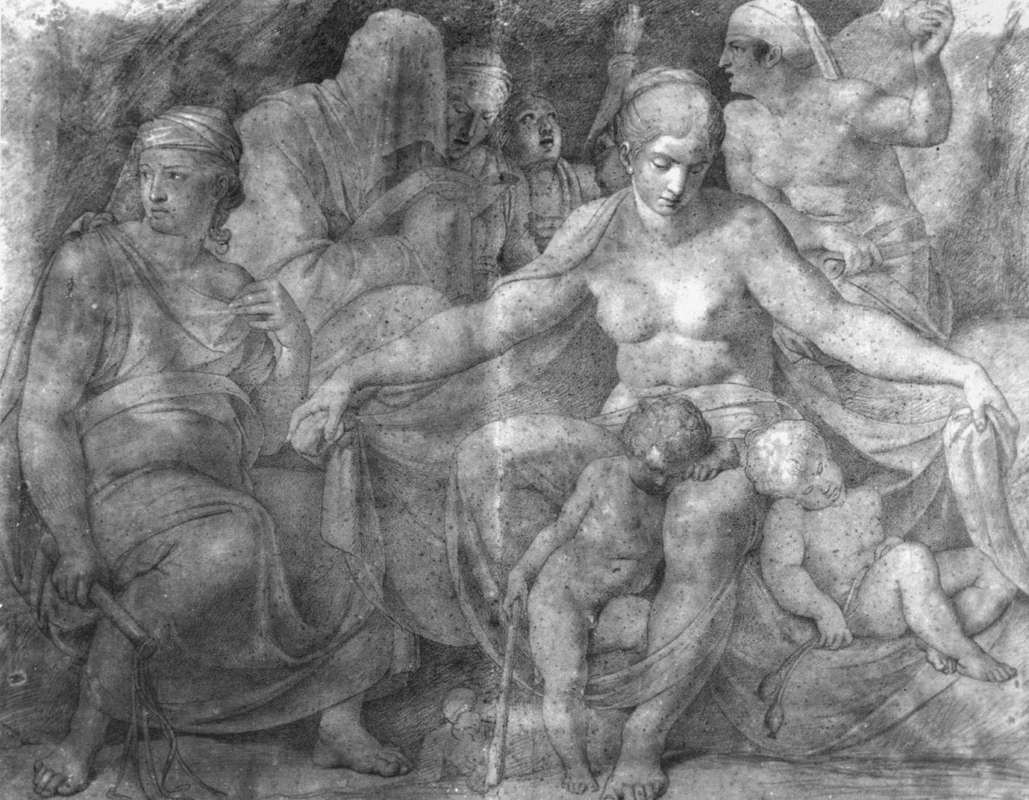
Night and Her Children, Sleep and Death, 1794

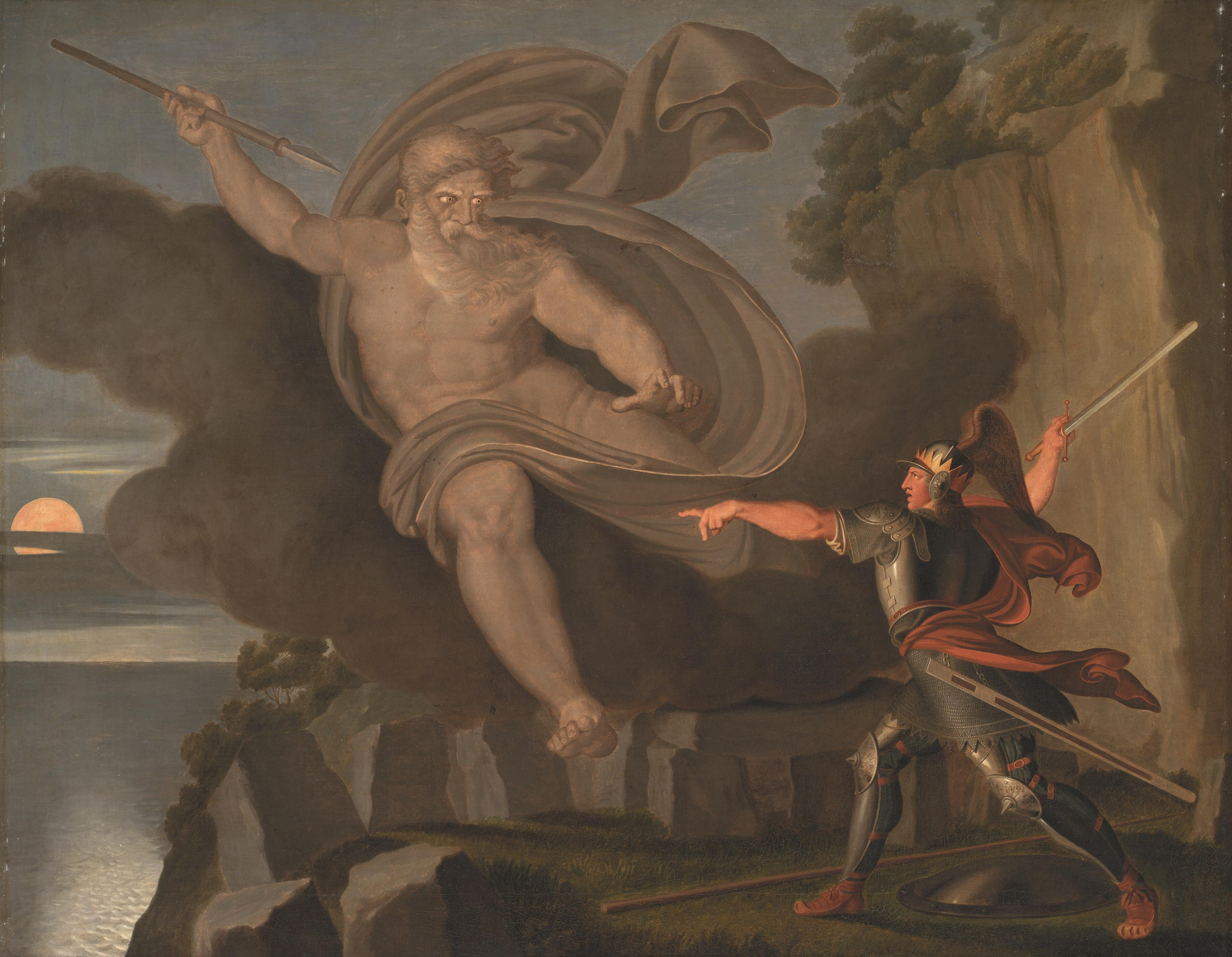
Fingal's Battle with the
Spirit of Loda, 1797

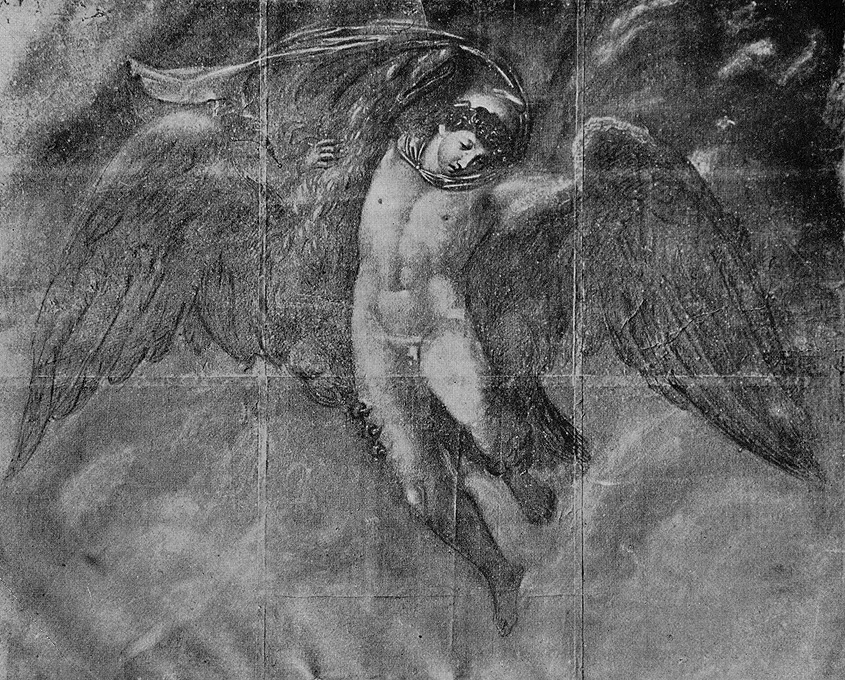
Ganymede, 1793

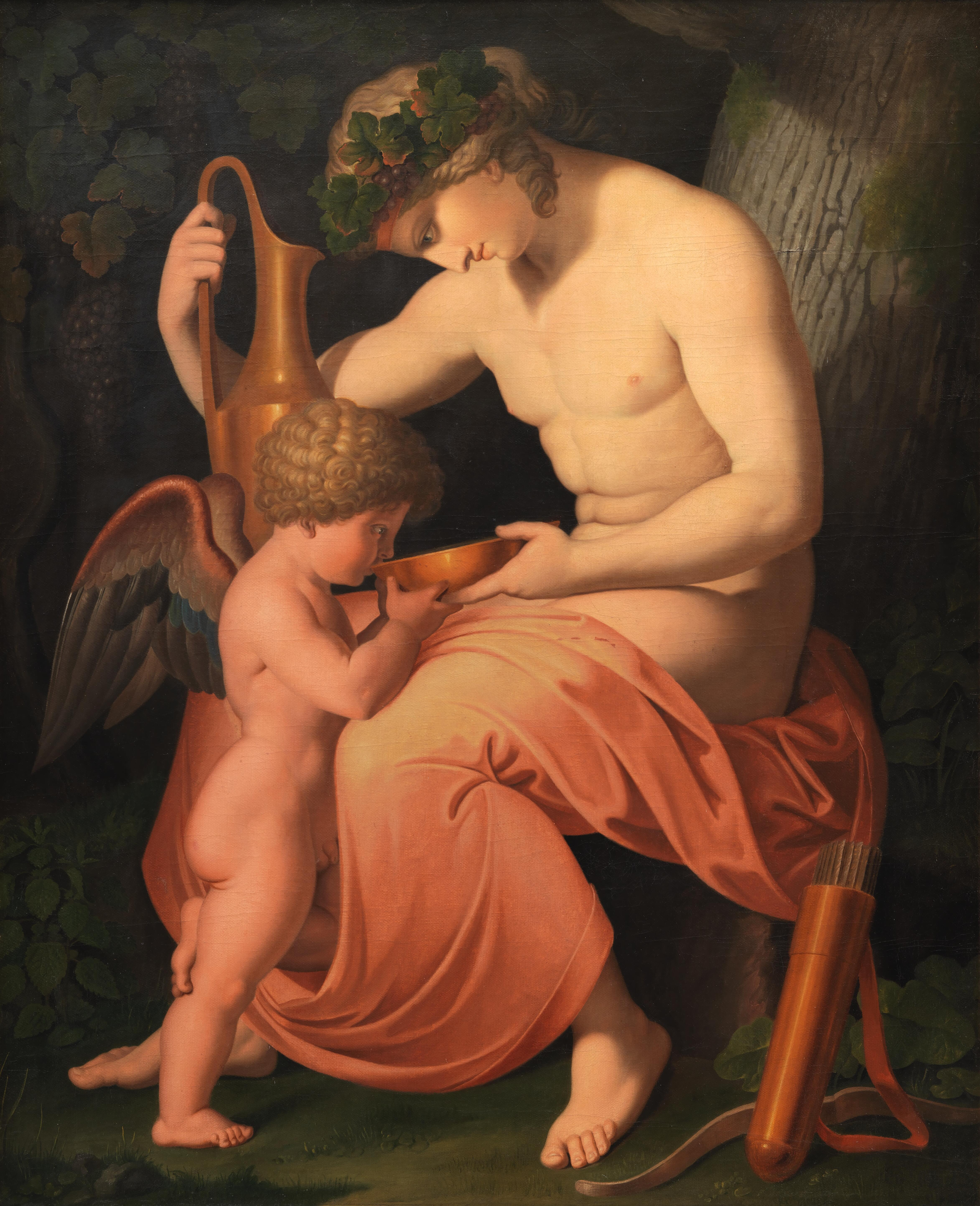
Bacchus and Cupid, 1796
