= David Raeburn =

British translator and director (1927–2021)

- Born: May 22, 1927; Hampstead, North London, England
- Died: February 1, 2021 (aged 93)
- Education: Christ Church, Oxford
- Occupations: Teacher, headmaster, director, and translator

David Antony Raeburn (May 22, 1927 – February 1, 2021) was a headmaster, Oxford tutor, ancient literature translator, and director of Greek dramas. Throughout his life, he spent much effort defending the role of classics in British education as well as performing Greek dramas.

== Biography ==
=== Early life ===
Raeburn was born as the eldest of seven children in Hampstead in North London. His parents were barrister and judge Walter Raeburn and artist Dora (née Williams). Walter (1897 – 1972, born in London) studied history at Christ Church, Oxford, later training to become a lawyer and passing the Bar in 1922. Marrying in 1925, he had four sons, three daughters (one of which dying soon after birth), as well as an adopted daughter from Austria. Walter enjoyed playwriting and dramatics as well as being active in his local church; he additionally served as the governor of multiple schools. His mother, Dora, helped design costumes for his plays. Raeburn was the cousin of John Schlesinger and engaged in some of his early celluloid endeavors.

Raeburn began learning Latin at the age of 8 and Greek at 10. His father had introduced him to classical music at an early age as well. Raeburn attended Port Regis Preparatory School and then Charterhouse school in Godalming, Surrey in which a classical education was much valued. In 1949, he graduated from Christ Church, Oxford with a degree in classics.

=== Teaching and personal life ===
After serving in the Royal Army Educational Corps from 1949 to 1951, Raeburn taught Classics and English at Bristol Grammar School. He went on to be 2nd Classics Master at Bradfield College in which had a rich tradition of performing Greek dramas. He served as the Head of Classics Department at Alleyn's School from 1958 to 1962. There, Raeburn met Mary Faith Hubbard and married her in 1961, having two sons with her, Mark, who runs a computer security company, and Martin, an artist; and a daughter, Fiona.

From 1963 to 1970, he was headmaster of Langley Park School for Boys. In 1968, he joined the Director of Joint Association of Classical Teachers after he co-founded the still-operating Greek summer school at Cheltenham; Raeburn continued administering the program until 1985; the program would later relocate to Bryanston School in Dorset. In 1970 he became headteacher at Whitgift School in Croydon of South London where he maintained its strong arts culture, oversaw building a science and technology block, and led efforts to eliminate corporal punishment in the school. He additionally held a Schoolmaster Fellowship at Jesus College, Cambridge in 1980.

=== Oxford ===
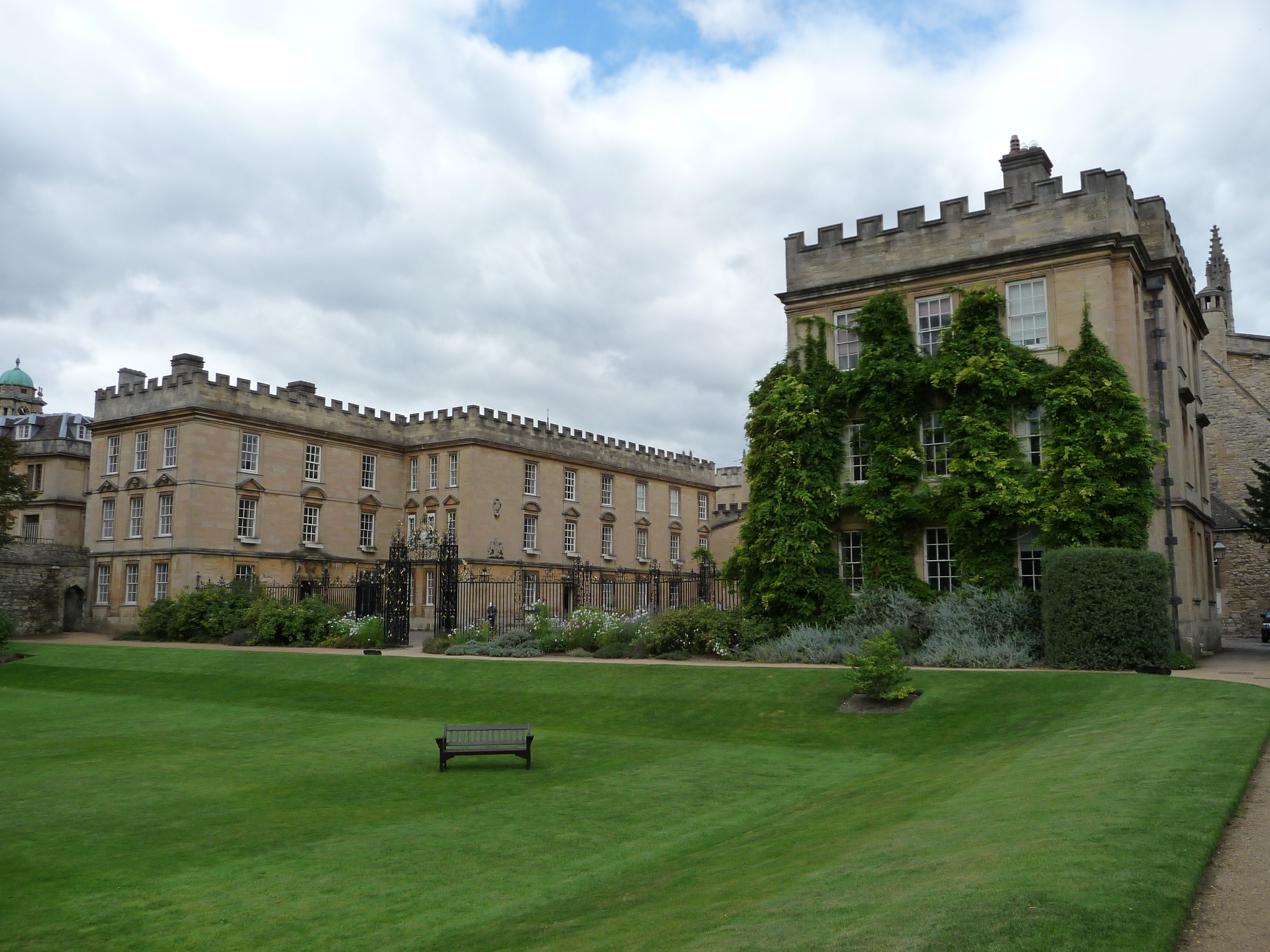
New College, Oxford

Raeburn retired in 1991 and went to Oxford where he was the Grammatikos, later, in 1992, becoming the Grocyn Lecturer at the Faculty of Literae Humaniores, where he played a central role managing and planning for the Ancient Greek and Latin departments. Raeburn spent much of the rest of his life tutoring, teaching, and working with classics, especially at Oxford University, including giving lectures at Oxford colleges Exeter, Balliol and New College, and guest speaking at JACT's Ancient Greek summer school as well as working on five classical projects in Sydney, Australia from 1982 to 1998.

Mary, Raeburn's wife, died in 2013. Raeburn himself died of an illness in 1 February 2021.

The University of Oxford's David Raeburn Prize (made in his honor) was a British youth (aged 11–18) drama competition hosted by the Faculty of Classics at Oxford partnered with the Archive of Performances of Greek and Roman Drama held in 2021, after Raeburn's death, judging submissions of performances of an ancient Latin or Greek drama.

== Directing ==
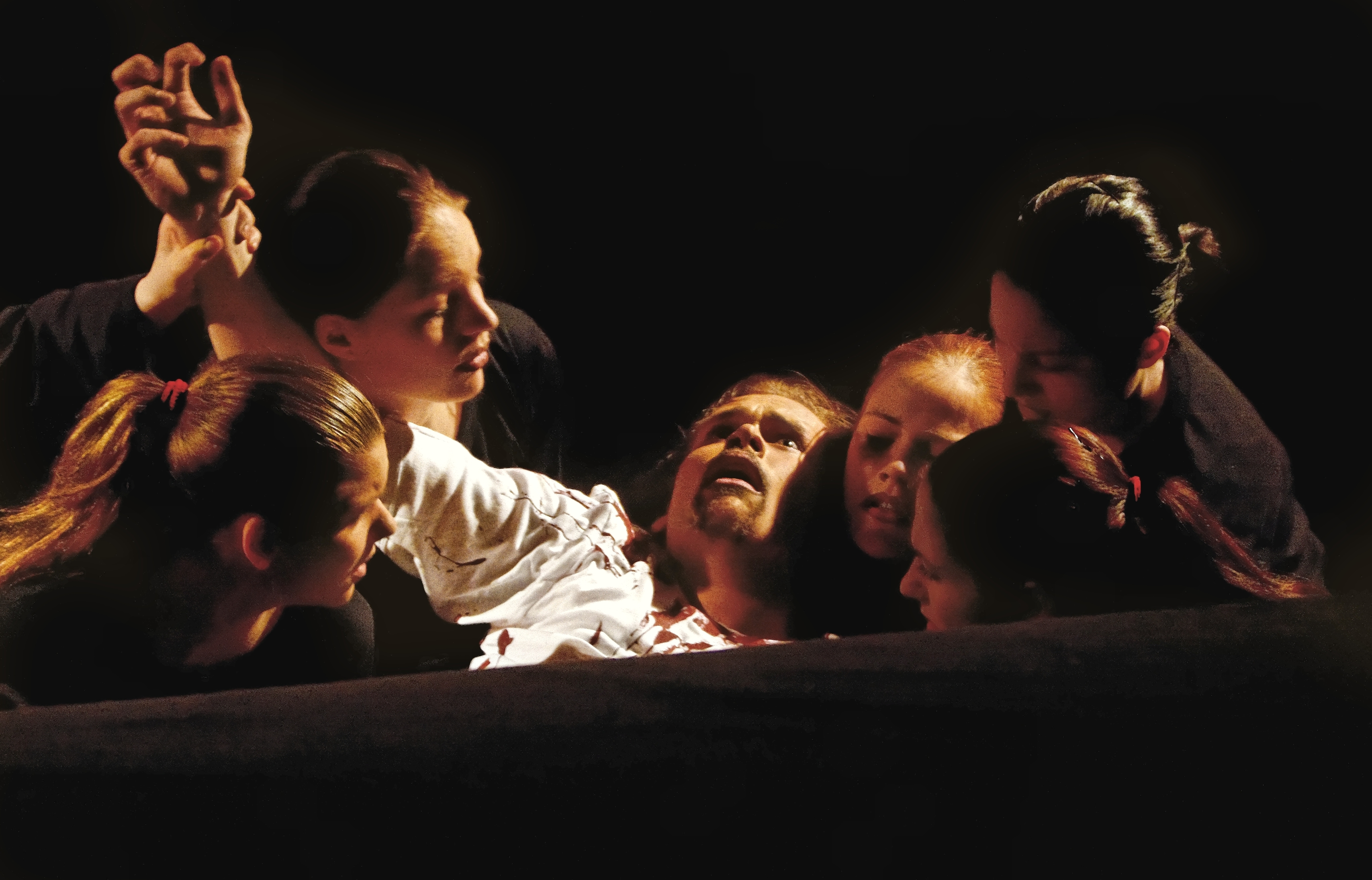
2008 Production of Aeschylus' Agamemnon at Studiobühne Siegburg

Raeburn's first interaction with classical plays was a Loeb edition of Alcestis in preparatory school; later, at Charterhouse, he read Cyclops and Prometheus Bound in their original Greek. He has put on over 30 productions of Greek plays during his years teaching (over ten of those he produced after the age of 80). Most of these antiquitous plays were from English translations (some of which him own), while some were performed in the original Greek. He preferred faithful adaptations to the ancient Greek dramatists shunning modernly-spun performances, such as those by Peter Hall. "My aim has been to interpret the text, to commune, as it were, with the poets" asserts Raeburn, "and to ask myself what they were trying to say in their own historical context. I felt that the play’s universality would then speak for itself, if one told the story directly and clearly."

He additionally directed some non-classical plays, including The School for Scandal, King Lear, The Winter’s Tale, and Peer Gynt, though performing Greek tragedies was his personal favorite. While not against Ancient Greek comedies (as he directed Seneca's Phaedra) he more favored tragedies and found it difficult to perform comedies with outdated jokes.

Greek tragedy productions by David Raeburn
Date	Play	Author	Location	Note
1947	Agamemnon	Aeschylus	Christ Church	Louis MacNeice translation; for Oxford Experimental Theatre Club
1952	Oedipus Tyrannus	Sophocles	Bristol Grammar School	Abridged E. F. Watling translation; all boys
1955	Oedipus Coloneus	Sophocles	Bradfield Greek Play	All boys
1958	Agamemnon	Aeschylus	Bradfield Greek Play	Louis MacNeice translation; all boys
1962	Philoctetes	Sophocles	Delphic Festivals at Mainz	E. F. Watling translation
1965	Philoctetes	Sophocles	Delphic Festivals at Verona	E. F. Watling translation
1971	The Anvil (Oresteia adaptation)	Aeschylus	Central Hall Westminister	Based on Richmond Lattimore translation; for Council for Education in World Citizenship
1971	Medea	Euripides	Dean Close	Rehearsed open-aired readings at JACT Greek Summer School
1973	Electra	Euripides	Dean Close	Rehearsed open-aired readings at JACT Greek Summer School
1974	Antigone	Sophocles	Dean Close	Rehearsed open-aired readings at JACT Greek Summer School
1975	Electra	Sophocles	Dean Close	Rehearsed open-aired readings at JACT Greek Summer School
1975	Hecuba	Euripides	Dean Close	Rehearsed open-aired readings at JACT Greek Summer School
1976	Trachiniae	Sophocles	Dean Close	
1977	Antigone	Sophocles	Whitgift School	David Raeburn translation (compressed and full original)
1978	Troades	Euripides	Dean Close	Rehearsed open-aired readings at JACT Greek Summer School
1979	Hippolytus	Euripides	Dean Close	Rehearsed open-aired readings at JACT Greek Summer School
1980	Electra	Sophocles	Dean Close	Rehearsed open-aired readings at JACT Greek Summer School
1980	Electra	Euripides	Cambridge Greek Play	
1981	Electra	Euripides	International symposium at Delphi	Revival of 1980 performance at Cambridge Greek Play
1982	Iphigenia in Aulis	Euripides	Sydney, Australia	Compressed David Raeburn translation and original Greek
1983	Troades	Euripides	Dean Close	Rehearsed open-aired readings at JACT Greek Summer School
1983	Trachiniae	Sophocles	Cambridge Centenary Greek Play	
1985	Prometheus Bound	Aeschylus	Dean Close	Script-less one-off performance
1988	Choephoroe	Aeschylus	Bryanston	Script-less one-off performance
1990	Eumenides	Aeschylus	Bryanston	Script-less one-off performance
1992	Antigone	Sophocles	Sydney, Australia	Approximately half of the Greek text with narrative links
1992	Medea	Euripides	Bryanston	Script-less one-off performance
1996	Hecuba	Euripides	Oxford Greek Play	
1997	Electra	Sophocles	Ascham School, Sydney	David Raeburn translation; all girls
1981	Iphigenia in Aulis	Euripides	Dean Close	Rehearsed open-aired readings at JACT Greek Summer School
1991	Iphigenia in Aulis	Euripides	Bryanston	Script-less one-off performance; compressed David Raeburn translation
1995	Hecuba	Euripides	Bryanston	Rehearsed open-aired readings at JACT Greek Summer School
2007	Philoctetes	Sophocles	New College Cloisters	David Raeburn translation
2008	Hippolytus	Euripides	New College Cloisters	Gilbert Murray translation
2012	Ion	Euripides	New College Cloisters	Philip Vellacott translation
2013	Bachhae	Euripides	New College Cloisters	David Raeburn translation
2014	Electra	Euripides	New College Cloisters	David Raeburn translation
2015	Oedipus Tyrannus	Sophocles	New College Cloisters	David Raeburn translation
2016	Antigone	Sophocles	New College Cloisters	David Raeburn translation
2017	Ajax	Sophocles	New College Warden's Garden	David Raeburn translation
2018	Oedipus Coloneus	Sophocles	New College Warden's Garden	David Raeburn translation
2019	Agamemnon	Aeschylus	New College	Louis MacNeice translation, same as first performance in 1947

== Translations and works ==
Throughout Raeburn's translational work, he strove to use rhythms closest to the original texts and widely-approachable grammar and text that could be understood and read aloud by an English reader.

In 2004, Raeburn's translation of Ovid's Metamorphoses was published by Penguin. His translations aims to appeal to new readership with little Latin contextual information without any infidelitous reconstructions of the myths; additionally, the vernacular is often commonplace, especially compared to other translations, to best mimic Ovid's simple Latin parlance. Striving to allow the book to be read aloud (in as-close-as-possible manner to the original Roman readers), Raeburn, straying from the more-commonly-used iambic pentameter, choose a meter matching Ovid's dactylic hexameter: "a verse with a rhythmic pulse of six stressed syllables which may be separated by two unstressed syllables rather than just one, as in an iambic line." The book is dedicated to Raeburn's wife, Mary Faith, for her early draft revisions, subsequent notes, and moral support.

In 2008, Penguin published Electra and Other Plays including four of his translations of Sophocles' tragedies: Electra, Ajax, Women of Trachis, Philoctetes. Raeburn additionally provided the book's preface and notes.

In 2011, Raeburn co-authored The Agamemnon of Aeschylus: A Commentary for Students with Oliver Thomas, published by Oxford University Press.

On August 3, 2016, Wiley-Blackwell published Raeburn's Greek Tragedies As Plays for Performance which discussed ten of the surviving 33 Athenian tragedies. The book covers plays by Aeschylus, Sophocles, and Euripides and includes analyses, synopses, historical contextualization, interpretation, and dramaturgy.

Raeburn has unpublished translations of Sophocles' Theban Plays— Antigone, Oedipus Rex, and Oedipus Coloneus— and Euripides' tragedies: Electra and Bacchae.
