= Second Delphic Festival =

The Second Delphic Festival, organised by Angelos Sikelianos and his wife Eva Palmer-Sikelianos was held between May 1–13, 1930 and consisted of three long weekends (May 1–3, 6–8 and 11–13): the programme was repeated three times (so that more people would be given the opportunity to attend the events).

== First Day (May 1 & 6 & 11, 1930) ==
The first day of the Second Festival reminded of the beginning of the equivalent First Festival in 1927. More specifically, in the morning (at around 10:00) the visitors gathered in front of the Archaeological Museum of Delphi in order to take a tour around the ancient monuments and the exhibits in the museum led by Greek and foreign archaeologists. At 1.00 p.m. food was served and at 4.30 p.m. the visitors gathered at the sound of the trumpet from the Phaedriades, in order to go to the Ancient Theatre. At 5 p.m. they watched Aeschylus' "Prometheus Bound" (as an introduction, the orchestra would execute the hymn to Apollo). Dinner was served at 8 p.m. and the day was concluded with the return of foreign visitors to the ships at Itea and at Arachova, as in those days no hotel infrastructure existed in Delphi.

== Second Day (May 2 & 7 & 12, 1930) ==
The main innovative element to the second day of these Festivals, which differentiated it from the Festival of 1927 (except some minor changes) was the performance of one more ancient Greek tragedy, the "Suppliants" by Aeschylus. Moreover, the program included a morning transfer to Delphi and a visit to the Artisan Fair, and breakfast at 1 pm. The representation of the "Suppliants" at the Ancient Theatre was scheduled at 5 p.m. (Director – costume designer: Eva Sikelianos, composer: K. Psachos, conductor: Phil. Economides, responsible for the masks: F. Rock, set design: G. Kontoleon. The leading parts were interpreted by C. Mavrogenis, I. Destouni and I. Avlonitis), a speech by Sikelianos for the Delphic Idea at 7 p.m. and dinner at 8 p.m., with "kleftika songs to the sounds of flutes and local instruments."

== Τhird Day (May 3 & 8 & 13, 1930) ==
All the events of the third day took place in the stadium ("full" of events and different from the equivalent one in the First Festival) since the revival of the Pythian Games, dedicated to the heroes of the Greek War for Independence, concluded the Second Delphic Festival. From 10.30 until 12.30, the spectators watched the parade and the oath of the athletes, the pentathlon (consisting of race, javelin, disc throwing, long jump and wrestling), the torch relay (along with the tug of war), the sporting games and the pyrrhic dance. Some new demonstrations and sports were introduced this time, namely the equestrian show-anthippasia-maneuvers, the hoplite-race and the demonstration by archers. A respite in this heavy program were the meals that the guests were offered at 01.00 p.m. and then at 4.00–6.00 p.m. The main and most important part of the evening, the "closure" of the Second Delphic Festival was the "brief lectures by Greek and foreign intellectuals on the Delphic Idea," the experience of these three days, and suggestions regarding the Festival.
