= Eleni Sikelianos =

American poet (born 1965)

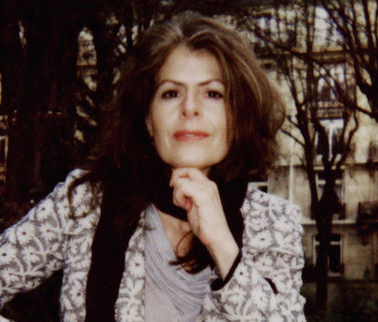
- Eleni Sikelianos
- Born: 1965 (age 60–61); California
- Education: Naropa University
- Occupations: Poet and Writer, Professor
- Spouse: Laird Hunt
- Relatives: Angelos Sikelianos (great-grandfather) Eva Palmer-Sikelianos (great-grandmother) Anne Waldman (Aunt)

Eleni Sikelianos (born 1965) is an American experimental poet with a particular interest in scientific idiom. She is Professor of Literary Arts at Brown University.

== Early life ==
Sikelianos is the great-granddaughter of the Greek poet Angelos Sikelianos, a former candidate for the Nobel Prize in Literature, and Eva Palmer-Sikelianos. She was raised in California. A high school dropout, she grew up on food stamps in California with a single mom, and graduated from the Naropa Institute with an MFA in Writing & Poetics.

== Career ==
Sikelianos works as Professor of Literary Arts at Brown University. She was poet-in-residence at two homeless shelters in San Francisco in the early-to-mid 1990s and then taught at Teachers & Writers Collaborative in New York City and literature and Bard College's Clemente Program. She co-ran the Wednesday Night Readings at the St. Mark's Poetry Project in St. Mark's Church. She has also taught at Naropa, and the University of Denver, where Eryn Green, Carolina Ebeid and Jennifer Elise Foerster have been her students, among many others.

Her work has appeared in Grand Street, Rattapallax, Sulfur, Chicago Review, and Fence. In an interview she gave with the California Journal of Poetics, Sikelianos discusses how zoology, cell biology, and marine biology became important to her early poetic sensibility. She cites Lynn Margulis’ work in evolutionary symbiosis and the work of D’Arcy Wentworth Thomas as influential."

== Personal life ==
She currently lives in Rhode Island with her husband, Laird Hunt, and their child.

== Awards ==
- Bogliasco Fellowship, Italy (2022)
- Yaddo Fellowships (2004, 2003, 1999, 2021)
- Ucross Foundation Fellowship (2021)
- The Helen Riaboff Whiteley Center (2016)
- National Endowment for the Arts Fellowships in Poetry (1995 & 2015)
- Residency at the Lannan Foundation (2011)
- Bourse de traduction, Centre national du livre, France (2010)
- Belles Etrangères Fellow (Centre national du livre), France (2009)
- The National Poetry Series (2002) (The Monster Lives of Books & Girls)
- Princeton University Seeger Fellow (2001)
- New York Foundation for the Arts Fellowship for Non-fiction Literature (2001)
- Fulbright Scholar, Greece (1999 & 2000)
- New York State Council for the Arts Translation Grant for Verses on Bird (2000) James D. Phelan Award for Blue Guide (1999)
- La Maison des Écrivains Étrangers et des Traducteurs Fellow, France (1999)
- Gertrude Stein Awards for Innovative American Writing (1997 & 1995)
- California Arts Council Residency Grant

== Works ==
=== Poetry ===
- Your Kingdom (Coffee House Press, 2023)
- What I Knew (Nightboat Books, 2019)
- Make Yourself Happy (Coffee House Press, 2017)
- The Loving Detail of the Living and the Dead (Coffee House Press, 2013)
- Body Clock (Coffee House Press, 2008)
- The California Poem. Coffee House Press. 2004. ISBN 978-1-56689-162-2.
- The Monster Lives of Boys & Girls. Green Integer. December 1, 2003. ISBN 978-1-931243-67-4.
- Earliest Worlds (Coffee House Press, 2001)
- The Book of Tendons (The Post-Apollo Press, 1997)
- To Speak While Dreaming (The Underground Forrest, Selva Editions) 1993

=== Hybrid Memoir ===
- You Animal Machine (The Golden Greek) (Coffee House Press, 2014)
- "from The Book of Jon". Ploughshares. Winter 2002–2003. Archived from the original on October 11, 2007.
- "from Body Clock". Tarpaulin Sky. Fall 2006.
- The Book of Jon (Nonfiction; City Lights, 2004).

=== Chapbooks ===
- Comerás un croissant para ser feliz, Pancaliente editoras, Ciudad de México, 2017. For a reading with Rodrigo Flores and Xitlátil Rodriguez on April 3, 2017. Eleni Sikeliano’s poems translated by Javier Taboada.
- How to Assemble the Animal Globe, with “blind embossings” by Christine Lee, ed. Marthe Reed, Nous-zōt Press, 2016.
- Oracle or, Utopia: ed. Jen Tynes, Horse Less Press, 2014
- The Abstracted Heart of Hours & Days, Bonfire Press, Center for Literary Publishing, Ft. Collins, eds. Sasha Steensen & Gordon Hadfield, Colorado, 2008.
- Excerpts from The Book of Jon, Belladonna Books/Boog Literature, eds. Rachel Levitsky & David Kirschenbaum, New York, NY, 2000. For a reading at Bluestockings Women’s Bookstore, Oct. 6, 2000, with Fanny Howe.
- Blue Guide, Poetry New York, ed. Tod Thilleman, 1999.
- The Lover's Numbers, Seeing Eye Books, Los Angeles, ed. Guy Bennett, 1998
- Au Lit Holy, or Transgressions of the Maghreb, Smokeproof Press, ed. Brad O'Sullivan, collaborative work, Erie, CO, 1998.
- The Book of Tendons, ed. Laird Hunt, Heart Hammer Books, Paris, 1996. For a reading at the Poetry Project with Susan Howe.
- Poetics of the Exclamation Point, Printed for the July 12, 1995 Kerouac School reading at the Fox Theater in Boulder, Colorado. Featured readers Robin Blaser, Anne Waldman, Lee Ann Brown, Allen Ginsberg, Jim Carroll, and Eleni Sikelianos.

=== Collaborative Artist Book ===
- Father had leaves, collaboration with Anne Slacik in the Livres peints (Painted Books) series, edition of 16 signed copies, made on 16 February 1996.

=== Criticism ===
- Elizabeth Willis, ed. (2008). "Life Pops from a Music Box Shaped Like a Gun". Radical Vernacular: Lorine Niedecker and the Poetics of Place. University of Iowa Press. ISBN 978-1-58729-698-7.

=== Anthologies ===
- The Rose Metal Press Field Guide to Graphic Literature: Artists and Writers on Creating Graphic Narratives, Poetry Comics, and Literary Collage, eds. Kelcey Parker Ervick and Tom Hart (Brookline: Rose Metal Press, 2022)
- More Revolutionary Letters: A Tribute in Memory of Diane di Prima (Denver: Wisdom Body Collective, 2021)
- The Body in Language (Denver: Counterpath Press, 2021)
- Counter-Desecration: A Glossary for Writing within the Anthropocene, eds. Reed and Russo (Middletown: Wesleyan University Press, 2018)
- Futures: Poetry of the Greek Crisis (translated into Greek; Athens: Hestia, 2016)
- Out of Everywhere: Linguistically Innovative Women Poets in North American and the UK (London: Reality Street, 2015)
- Futures: Poetry of the Greek Crisis (London: Penned in the Margins, 2015)
- Funk & Wag from A to Z (Mel Chin) (Houston: Menil Collection in collaboration with Yale University Press, 2014)
- Postmodern American Poetry: A Norton Anthology, ed. Paul Hoover (New York: W.W. Norton, 2013)
- The &NOW Awards 2: The Best Innovative Writing, &NOW Books (Lake Forest: Lake Forest College Press, 2013)
- Bioblitz: Poetic Inventory of Rocky Mountain National Park, ed. Charles Malone (Ft. Collins: Wolverine Farm Publishing, 2013)
- The Americas Anthology of New Writings: From Patagonia to Nunavut (Lubbock: Texas Tech University Press, 2013)
- The Aracdia Project, eds. Corey and Waldrep, (Ahsahta Press, 2012)
- Paris: an Anthology, eds. Barns and Fernandez, (Toronto: Tightrope Books, Toronto, 2011)
- What the World Hears: California Poets in the Schools Statewide Anthology, 45th Anniversary Edition (San Francisco: CPITS, 2011)
- American Hybrid: A Norton Anthology of Contemporary Poetry, eds. Cole Swensen and David St. John (New York: W.W. Norton, 2008)
- Satellite Convulsions: Poems from Tin House, eds. Brenda Shaughnessy and CJ Evans (Portland: Tin House Books, 2008)
- A Best of Fence: The First Nine Years, ed. Caroline Crumpacker, (New York: Fence Books, 2008)
- Efforts & Affections: America’s New Women Poets and the Generation that Inspires Them, (Iowa City: Iowa University Press, 2008)
- The Reality Street Book of Sonnets, ed. Jeff Hilson, (Hastings, U.K.: Reality Street Editions, 2008)
- PP/FF: An Anthology, Peter H. Conners, ed. (Starcherone Books, 2006)
- Civil Disobediences: Poetics and Politics in Action, Anne Waldman & Lisa Birman, eds. (Coffee House Press, 2004)
- Kindled Terraces: American Poets in Greece, Don Schofield, ed. (Truman State University Press, 2004)
