= Ajax (play) =

Ancient Greek tragedy by Sophocles

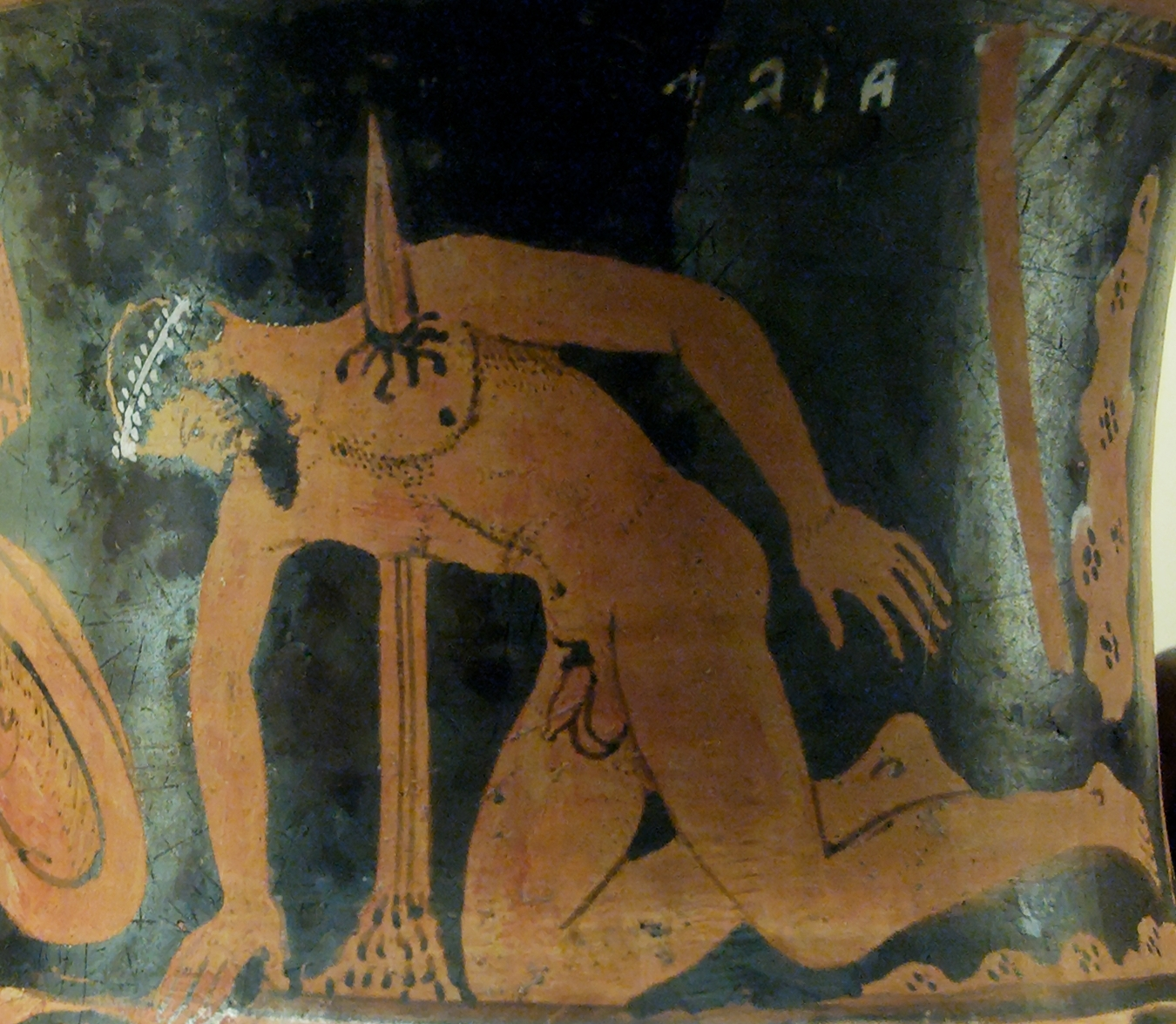
- The Suicide of Ajax. Etruscan red-figured calyx-krater, c. 400–350 BCE. Currently in British Museum (1867,0508.1328)
- Original language: Ancient Greek
- Written by: Sophocles
- Chorus: Sailors from Salamis
- Characters: Athena; Odysseus; Ajax; Tecmessa; Messenger; Teucer; Menelaus; Agamemnon
- Mute: Attendants; Servants; Soldiers; Eurysaces
- Genre: Tragedy

Premiere
- Place: Athens

Sophocles' Ajax, or Aias (/ˈeɪdʒæks/ or /ˈaɪ.əs/; Ancient Greek: Αἴας [a͜í.aːs], gen. Αἴαντος), is a Greek tragedy written in the 5th century BCE. Ajax may be the earliest of Sophocles' seven tragedies to have survived, though it is probable that he had been composing plays for a quarter of a century already when it was first staged. It appears to belong to the same period as his Antigone, which was probably performed in 442 or 441 BCE, when he was 55 years old. The play depicts the fate of the warrior Ajax the Great, the second greatest hero at Troy (after Achilles), after the events of the Iliad but before the end of the Trojan War.

== Plot ==
The play opens with a dialogue between Athena and Odysseus: After the great warrior Achilles had been killed in battle, there was a question as to who should receive his armor. As the man who now could be considered the greatest Greek warrior, Ajax felt he should be given Achilles' armor, but the two kings, Agamemnon and Menelaus, awarded it instead to Odysseus. Ajax became furious and decided to kill the three of them. However, Athena stepped in and deluded Ajax into instead killing the spoil of the Greek army, which includes cattle as well as the herdsman. Athena gave false visions to Ajax, making him see the animals as humans.

Athena summons Ajax, who comes on stage and expresses his belief that he has slaughtered Agamemnon and Menelaus. He departs in order to hunt Odysseus. His concubine, Tecmessa, and the chorus discuss and describe Ajax's madness and terrible actions. They are interrupted by Ajax crying out from off-stage, as Ajax suddenly comes to his senses and realizes what he has done. Overwhelmed by shame, he decides to commit suicide. Tecmessa pleads for him not to leave her and their child, Eurysaces, unprotected. Ajax then gives his son his shield, and leaves the house saying that he is going out to purify himself and to bury the sword given to him by Hector. Teucer, Ajax's half-brother, arrives. Teucer has learned from the prophet, Calchas, that Ajax should not be allowed to leave his tent until the end of the day or he will die. Tecmessa and soldiers then try to find Ajax, but they are too late. Ajax has indeed buried his sword – by impaling himself upon it. Before his suicide, Ajax calls for vengeance against the sons of Atreus (Menelaus and Agamemnon) and the whole Greek army. Tecmessa is the first one to discover Ajax's body. Teucer then arrives and orders that Ajax's son be brought to him so that he will be safe from foes. Menelaus appears and orders the body not to be moved.

The last part of the play is taken up with an angry dispute regarding what to do with Ajax's body. The two kings, Agamemnon and Menelaus, want to leave the body unburied for scavengers to ravage, while Teucer wants to bury it. Odysseus arrives and persuades Agamemnon and Menelaus to allow Ajax a proper funeral. Odysseus points out that even one's enemies deserve respect in death. The play ends with Teucer making arrangements for the burial.

== Ajax or Aias ==
The original title of the play in the ancient Greek is Αἴας. Ajax is the romanized version, and Aias is the English transliteration from the original Greek. Proper nouns in Ancient Greek have conventionally been romanized before entering the English language, but it has been common for translations since the end of the 20th century to use direct English transliterations of the original Greek.

The text of the play suggests the original pronunciation of Ajax's name. In lines 430–432, Ajax (or Aias) himself says that it has an onomatopoeic resemblance to a wailing cry of lament: "aiai!" Translators have treated this passage in different ways:

Aiai! My name is a lament!
Who would have thought it would fit
so well with my misfortunes!
Now truly I can cry out – aiai! –
two and three times in my agony.

Aiee, Ajax! My name says what I feel;
who'd have believed that pain and I'd be one;
Aiee, Ajax! I say it twice,
and then again, aiee, for what is happening.

== Critical reception and analysis ==
Ajax preparing for suicide in a depiction by the black-figure vase painter Exekias, ca. 540 BCE.

Ajax, as he appears in this play, in the Iliad, and other myths, is a heroic figure, a "rugged giant", with strength, courage and the ability to think quickly well beyond the normal standards of mankind. He was considered a legendary character to the people of ancient Athens. Numerous Homeric myths describe him coming to the rescue of his fellow man in dire moments.

Hugh Lloyd-Jones points out that many authorities consider Ajax an early play, but he suggests that if the text excludes material that he has bracketed, then it would seem to be a "mature masterpiece, probably not much earlier than Oedipus Tyrannus". Lloyd-Jones considers various lines that have been taken by critics interpreting the play, and finds that some consider that the Greek gods are being portrayed by Sophocles as just, and that when Ajax suffers it is a learning experience for the character and the audience. Other interpretations of the play, according to Lloyd-Jones, instead consider that Ajax is being portrayed heroically in defiance of the unjust and capricious gods. Lloyd-Jones notes that Ajax's murderous intention in this play is not softened by the playwright, and the difficult aspects of his character are fully depicted, but in spite of that Sophocles shows profound sympathy for the greatness of Ajax, and appreciation for the bravery in Ajax's realization that suicide is the only choice – if he is to maintain his conception of honor and his sense of self.

In another interpretation, Robert Bagg and James Scully point out that the play is composed in two distinct parts; the first part is steeped in the old world, a world of kings and heroes, and the second part resembles more the democratic world of Sophocles' Greece, and is marked by an imperfect debate of contending ideas. Bagg and Scully consider that the play, with its two parts, may be seen as an important epoch-spanning work that raises complex questions, including: How does 5th-century Greece advance from the old world into the new? Especially considering that Greece, in its stories and thoughts, clings to and reveres the old world? And while clinging to the past, Greece considers that its new, democratic order is important and vital. As Bagg and Scully contend, Ajax, with his brute force, has been a great warrior-hero of the old world, but the Trojan war itself has changed and become a quagmire; what's needed now is a warrior who is intelligent – someone like Odysseus. Ultimately, according to Bagg and Scully's interpretation, Ajax must still be respected, and the end of the play demonstrates respect and human decency with the promise of a proper burial.

John Moore interprets the play as primarily a character study of Ajax, who, when he first appears, covered in the blood of the animals that he in his madness has killed, presents an image of total degradation; the true action of the play, according to Moore, is how this image is transformed from degradation, as Ajax recovers his heroic power and humanity. The play, according to Moore, personifies in Ajax an affirmation of what is heroic in life. Translators Frederic Raphael and Kenneth McLeish called the work a "masterpiece", arguing that "Sophocles turned the almost comic myth of a bad loser into a tragedy of disappointment, folly, and divine partiality."

Bernard Knox considers Ajax's speech on "time" to be "so majestic, remote and mysterious, and at the same time so passionate, dramatic and complex" that if this were the only writing we had of Sophocles, he would still be considered "one of the world's greatest poets." The speech begins:

Long rolling waves of time
bring all things to light
and plunge them down again
in utter darkness.

In a study of the phenomenon of suicide bombers, one author, Arata Takeda, says that though in the end it does not quite work out that way, Ajax's death resembles that kind of strategy, when Ajax calls on the Erinyes, the "avenging deities of the underworld", to destroy his foes.

== Performance history ==
The American director Peter Sellars staged an adaption of the play, also called Ajax, written by Robert Auletta at the Kennedy Center in Washington, D.C. and at the La Jolla Playhouse in San Diego in 1986. The setting was relocated to the United States in the near future, having recently won a war in Latin America, which had, however, gone very badly. Howie Seago played Ajax, Ralph Marrero played Menelaus, Aleta Mitchell played Athene, and Ben Halley Jr. was the leader of the chorus. The set design was by George Tsypin and the costumes by Dunya Ramicova.

Ajax was produced at the American Repertory Theater in Cambridge in 2011, in modern dress, with a setting that appeared to be a war zone somewhere in the Middle East. It was translated by Charles Connaghan, and directed by Sarah Benson.

In May 2016, Jeff S. Dailey directed the play for a limited Off Broadway run at the John Cullum Theatre in midtown Manhattan. It set the play Sophocles' original location of Troy and featured Matthew Hansen in the title role.

A new performance translation of Ajax, by Maura Giles-Watson, was commissioned and staged by the Old Globe/University of San Diego Shiley Graduate Theatre Program in February 2017. The new production was designed and directed by Ray Chambers.

JACK Theater in Brooklyn, New York, presented moments after Aias, a new version of the play written and directed by Andrew Watkins in July 2026. The adaptation was workshopped at the Brooklyn Center for Research in 2024.

=== Adaptations ===
Timberlake Wertenbaker's play Our Ajax, which was first performed in November 2013 at the Southwark Playhouse, London, was inspired by Sophocles' tragedy. It has a contemporary military setting, with references to modern warfare including the conflicts in Iraq and Afghanistan. Wertenbaker made use of interviews with current and former servicemen and women in developing the play.

== English translations ==
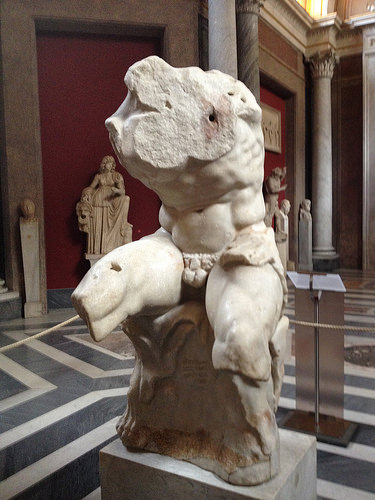
The Belvedere Torso, a marble sculpture carved in the 1st century BCE possibly depicting Ajax.

- Thomas Francklin, 1759.
- Theodore Alois Buckley, 1849.
- Edward Hayes Plumptre, 1878. (full text available at Wikisource)
- Lewis Campbell, 1883 (full text, with audio, available at Wikisource)
- Francis Storr, 1913.
- Richard Claverhouse Jebb, [1896] 1917. (full text available at Wikisource)
- R. C. Trevelyan, 1919. (full text available at Wikisource)
- E. F. Watling, 1953.
- John Moore, 1957.
- Robert Auletta, 1986.
- Robert Cannon, 1990.
- Hugh Lloyd-Jones, 1994.
- Frederick Raphael and Kenneth McLeish, 1998.
- Michael Evans, 1999.
- Herbert Golder and Richard Pevear, 1999.
- David Raeburn, 2008.
- John Tipton, 2008.
- George Theodoridis, 2009 – prose: full text.
- Ian C. Johnston, 2009 – verse: full text.
- James Scully, 2011.
- Charles Connaghan, 2011.
- Oliver Taplin, 2015.
- Lewis Campbell, 2015. (reprint of the 1883 edition)
- Maura Giles-Watson, 2017 (new performance translation) full text downloadable
- Margie Freeman, 2022: full text downloadable
