= The Dithyramb of the Rose =

The Dithyramb of the Rose (Greek: Ο Διθύραμβος του Ρόδου) is the first tragedy by Angelos Sikelianos written and published in 1932. The first performance was held in Athens, in 1933. This play, is fermented through the beliefs of Sikelianos for Delphi, the Delphic Idea, and the two, already completed, Delphic Festivals (containing in their programme the staging of tragedies: "Prometheus Bound" during the first Delphic Festival and the "Suppliants" in the second). The play, was translated into English in 1939.

== Plot ==
The tragedy is inspired by the ancient Greek myth of Orpheus. This is demonstrated by the announcement to his faithful followers and comrades that he will perform a sacrifice to the God at the top of mount Paggaio with the risk of execution and dismemberment by the sacred Maenads of Dionysus. The personae speaking are Orpheus, the First Leader of the Chorus A and the Second Leader of the Chorus B (the latter two as representatives of the large chorus of faithful-comrades following Orpheus). This tragedy has the structure of the early types of this genre, showing higher correlations with the dithyramb (exchange of responses – partly improvised – between the leader of the chorus or the leaders of the chorus and other persons outside the chorus) that evolves into a tragedy, more than a tragedy (with distinct principles and structure) itself.

Sikelianos, influenced by the Orphic theology and its founder and leader, Orpheus, places him as Hierophant – officiant in the myth, with clear references to Dionysus. As scholars have said, the individual symbols (besides Orpheus-Dionysus) of ear of grain (symbolizing the earth), the vine (symbolizing the intoxication of love) and, especially the rose (symbol of life embedded in love) that are eminent in the play are allegorically bound with the tragedy itself (these symbols do not lose their mystic nature throughout the course of the play) and aim at transmitting a universal message of peace, harmony and unity among all people, a "key" message to understanding all creative events of Sikelianos (literary work and organization of the Delphic Festivals – the dedication to Delphic Idea).
