= Sikelianos' Delphic Appeal =

1930 text by Greek poet Angelos Sikelianos

The Delphic Appeal is a text created by Angelos Sikelianos recited during the 2nd Delphic Festival in 1930.

== Content ==
The main ideas of this ‘call by Sikelianos’ are two: first, the spirit of "Creative Love" that moves life ("Humanity wants to love," he says at the beginning of the speech), which is the deepest purpose of humanity and -owes to- shape people's lives according to "Life" and, second, to show to all mankind ("human beings") their proper “intellectual age”, which is maturity and adulthood ("masculinity" as a phase of global life following puberty, the perfect 'juices' of mental balance).

== "Creative Love" as a constant sense of the universe ==
This "secret substance" of the universe is - in a way- not yet experienced by people as an existential priority. It is said that people resist to the attempted change, because most are "not yet fully awake" and feel "unable to savour the outcome of this first dawn", and few are those who understand that "the great darkness, like Python [...] is mortally wounded and writhing" and "they are waiting for the first great wave of rising sun" through an "endless movement, a reciprocating awesome struggle of all creatures to live in their new society in Love. The role of intellectualism in this context can only be the "deepening" of our consciousness towards "Love", or any other outcome would be a "bestiality to the divine forces of Nature." Sikelianos is not a "prophet for none," but is merely denouncing the "commercial pressures of cultures”, adding that – the socio political in essence - revolutions "that are governed by hunger" of "deteriorated societies" are good for the "progress of the Nation", but are not the optimum, the thing that will lead to the perfect life that he preaches for.

== The "manhood" of the human race ==
Regarding the spiritual maturity of humanity, Sikelianos states (away from the "hazy moods and false margins of humanism" that foster conservatism) that it is the duty of all people: as "shepherds" they have to preach a "new intellectual and moral autonomy "and tell the world what is their age ("to let them know their age" he says). Through a global cooperation, the "Neodorieis" (this is how he calls these people) will fight to restore the lost spiritual "Health" of the world so that a new world of Ierogamia” (harmonic matching between spirit and matter, a synthesis of Apollo and Dionysus), with its foundations on the ancient Greek civilization (the "most consistent and vindicated as to our purpose "says Sikelianos, and "Temple for the Rebirth of Man") and will have the Delphic University as its main exponent.
