= Laird Hunt =

American writer, translator, academic (born 1968)

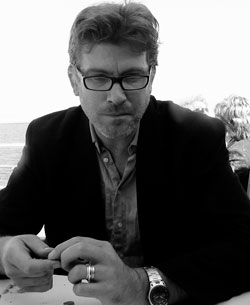
- Laird Hunt
- Born: April 3, 1968 (age 58); Singapore
- Education: Indiana University Bloomington (BA); Jack Kerouac School (MFA)
- Occupation: Novelist
- Spouse: Eleni Sikelianos
- Children: 1
- Website: www.lairdhunt.org

Laird Hunt (born April 3, 1968) is a Singapore-born American writer, translator, and academic.

== Early life and education ==
Laird Hunt was born on April 3, 1968, in Singapore. His father was an American banker who moved along with his family in various places such as Amsterdam, London, and elsewhere. After his parents divorced, Hunt was sent to live with his grandmother in Indiana, where he went to the Clinton Central High School.

He earned a Bachelor of Arts from Indiana University Bloomington in 1989 and a Master of Fine Arts in Creative Writing from the Jack Kerouac School of Disembodied Poetics at Naropa University in 1996. He studied French literature at the Sorbonne in 1996.

== Academia ==
He was for a time a professor in the Creative Writing program at University of Denver. He currently teaches in Brown University’s Literary Arts Program.

== Writing ==
Hunt is the author of nine novels and two collections of short works, including the 2021 National Book Award finalist Zorrie. He has translated several novels from the French, including Oliver Rohe's Vacant Lot (2010) and Stuart Merrill's Paul Verlaine (2010).

His works is said to intersect several genres, including experimental literature, exploratory fiction, literary noir, speculative fiction and difficult fiction and include elements ranging from the bizarre, the tragic, and the comic.

His influences include Georges Perec, W. G. Sebald, Samuel Beckett, Franz Kafka and the French Modernists.

While working on his first novel, Hunt worked in the press office at the United Nations.

Hunt's reviews and essays have been published in The New York Times, the Washington Post, the Wall Street Journal, the Daily Beast, The Guardian, the Irish Times, and the Los Angeles Times. His fiction and translations have appeared in literary journals such as Conjunctions, McSweeney's, Bomb, Ploughshares, Bookforum, The Believer, Fence, and Zoetrope. For a time, Hunt was editor in the Denver Quarterly.

== Film adaptations ==
In 2014, it was announced by Element Pictures that Irish director Lenny Abrahamson would film an adaptation of Hunt's Civil War novel Neverhome, but the project did not materialize.

== Personal life ==
Hunt lives in Providence, Rhode Island with his wife Eleni Sikelianos, a poet and the grand-grand-daughter of Greek poet Angelos Sikelianos, and their daughter Eva.

== Awards and honors ==
- 2013 Anisfield-Wolf Book Awards for fiction for Kind One
- 2013 PEN/Faulkner Award for Fiction finalist for Kind One
- 2015 Grand Prix de Littérature Américaine for Neverhome
- 2021 National Book Award for Fiction finalist for Zorrie
- 2024 Guggenheim Fellowship.

== Works ==
- —— (1999). Dear Home. Small Press Distribution. ISBN 9781893032200.
- —— (2010) [2000]. The Paris Stories. Smokeproof Press; Marick Press. ISBN 9780965887786.
- —— (2012) [2001]. The Impossibly. Minneapolis: Coffee House Press. ISBN 9781566891172.
- —— (2003). Indiana, Indiana. Minneapolis: Coffee House Press. ISBN 9781566891448.
- —— (2006). The Exquisite. Minneapolis: Coffee House Press. ISBN 9781566891875.
- —— (2009). Ray of the Star. Minneapolis: Coffee House Press. ISBN 9781566892322.
- —— (2012). Kind One. Minneapolis: Coffee House Press. ISBN 9781566893114.
- —— (2014). Neverhome. New York: Little, Brown and Company. ISBN 9780316370134.
- —— (2013). The &NOW Awards 2: The Best Innovative Writing. &NOW Books, Lake Forest College Press. ISBN 9780982315644.
- —— (2017). The Evening Road. Little, Brown and Company. ISBN 9780316391283.
- —— (2018). In the House in the Dark of the Woods. Little, Brown and Company. ISBN 9780316411059.
- —— (2021). Zorrie. Bloomsbury Publishing. ISBN 9781635575361.
- —— (2023). This Wide Terraqueous World. Coffee House Press. ISBN 9781566896672.
- —— (2024). Float Up, Sing Down. Bloomsbury Publishing. ISBN 9781639730100.
