= Christ in Rome =

Play by Angelos Sikelianos

Christ in Rome (Greek: Ο Χριστός στη Ρώμη) is a tragedy by Angelos Sikelianos, written and published in 1946. The play is set in 1st-century AD Rome, a few years after the crucifixion of Christ at the exact point in time when the disastrous fire of Nero will burn the city to the ground. The main characters of the tragedy are Christ, Nero, Greek Prochoros and Jews Manain and Daisan.

== Plot ==
In this play, Sikelianos praises the tortured, tormented and despised people (which is cared for and supported by the Christ, a figure that is concerned first and foremost for the weak and underprivileged of this world) in an effort to elevate the integrity, the ideal of its original, folk spirit.

The play addresses matters such as Greece and the way it deals with things and ideas, its contribution to the world (mainly through Prochoros), while in the end the tragedy highlights the Christian peace and purity (Christ is a symbol that is trying to unite the different views). Christ is the successor to the Greek spirit or at least he is the linking force that will play an important role on co-forming (with the Greek element) the new ideals for life. Formulating this shape through the terms of scholars, we would say that the prophetic and high tone of the tragedy is in parallel with the "human temperature", with human faith and militancy. The predominant request - message of the play, the universal Unity into which the fragmented World needs to return to (the world was fragmented after the matricide committed with the refusal of the Mother-Earth within the city-states) is served only with a Catharsis, with the end of this historic cycle and the "reinvention" of the world (the "eternal return" also found in the Stoic theory) through a purifying-cathartic (and therefore destructive) power and manner. This manner, according to Sikelianos, is fire that will burn everything (a popular motif in the work of Sikelianos in general, since he has used it in many other tragedies).

The main episode of Christ in Rome with great length and key importance – and also the main theme of the plot is the scene of the fire that burns Rome. The re-creation of all things will come in the face the Jew Daisan, who will salvage an infant from the burning ruins of a building, a symbol of hope for the future: in other words and in direct correlation with the ancient myths and Greek tragedy, Daisan becomes the father-Zeus of the new Dionysus – hope for the future of the world. But, as a man Daisan has also restored the fault of all mankind, the fault that cost him Paradise: he has rescued Dionysus-Art, which is the way to render the human race immortal. All these symbolisms and interpretations, as in all the other tragedies by Sikelianos, are based on the texts of the original sources, the inexhaustible material of ancient tragedy, which so aptly and delicately Sikelianos "disguises" and "hides" within his own text.

== Sources ==
- Merriam-Webster's Encyclopedia of Literature, 1995.
- John Gassner, The Reader's Encyclopedia of World Drama, 2002.
- Bruce Merry, Encyclopedia of Modern Greek Literature, 2004.
- Πέτρος Χάρης, «Οι τραγωδίες του Άγγελου Σικελιανού», περ. Νέα Εστία, τ. 127, τχ. 1503, 15 Φεβρουαρίου 1990.
