= Asclepius (Sikelianos) =

1955 unfinished Greek tragedy

Asclepius is the sixth tragedy (lyric) of Angelos Sikelianos and the only one that was unfinished. It was partially written between 1915 and the end of the poet's life in 1951. It was published in 1955.

The main plot takes place in late antiquity Greece which is under the apparent influence of Rome, as well as during the first years of Christianity, in the 4th century AD, and follows the struggle of sick athlete Igesias to get well – by putting his hopes on Asclepius and his sanctuary in Epidaurus. The scenery (the Asklepieion of Epidaurus and the cults relating to the treatment of illnesses and human health at a time when new Christian ideas are emerging) clearly reflects the intention of Sikelianos to talk about a time of conflict between two major traditions (the Greek and the Christian spirit) and their final reconciliation and synthesis—in the work. The character of Igesias (leadership) (a symbol—with a proper name for the political events occurring during the last editing of the work; both as a concept for the people and also the poet) is carrying within the purity of the ancient ideals, but also embraces the Christian beliefs, proceeding to a blending of the two worldviews.

In this way, the improvement of the health of Igesias (meaning that of the people) will be made possible through those changes that the people will willingly accept and implement (in everyday life) aiming at their spiritual progress, rebirth and its treatment of the disease. At the same time, the soul of the poet Igesias—is cured from all personal passions and problems and he finds Health (healing as a principle is apparent throughout text that has been salvaged to date), a meeting that is affecting the situation (and the desire for treatment) of the poet in the final period of writing of the play: Sikelianos is ill and is gradually unable to leave his sickbed (the end is not far away). Therefore, the redemption of the soul of Igesias which will be the salvation for the poet, is the salvation of his own soul.

The connection with ancient Greek tragedy is once again present. It has been suggested that Igesias – who comes from Argos – be identified with the "sick" Orestis of the ancient drama, who also comes from Argos (many schemes and elements of the tragedy of Sikelianos, especially those relevant to Igesias, - the illness that he has which is a result of a mental illness - the therapy through sleep and dreams that are directly suggestive of what we would in ancient drama call "correspondences" and "ideals").

== Sources ==
- Σικελιανός. Η συνάντηση των Δελφών (τριάντα χρόνια από τον θάνατό του), «Ευθύνη»/Κείμενα της Μεθορίου 7, Αθήνα 1982.
- Αντώνης Γλυτζουρής, «Παρακμή, μυστικισμός και οι νεκροφάνειες της ελληνικής ράτσας. Ο Ασκληπιός του Άγγελου Σικελιανού», Μυστικισμός και τέχνη. Από τον θεοσοφισμό του 1900 στη ‘νέα εποχή’: εξάρσεις και επιβιώσεις (7 & 8 Δεκεμβρίου 2007), Εταιρεία Σπουδών Νεοελληνικού Πολιτισμού και Γενικής Παιδείας – Σχολή Μωραΐτη, Αθήνα 2010, σ. 119–142.
- Θεόδωρος Ξύδης, «Οι τραγωδίες του Σικελιανού», περ. Νέα Εστία, τ. 90, τχ. 1056, 1η Ιουλίου 1971, σ. 847–853.
- Μαντώ Μαλάμου, Τα προσωπεία του Διονύσου. Η «Θυμέλη» του Άγγελου Σικελιανού και το αρχαίο δράμα, εκδόσεις Γρηγόρη, Αθήνα 2014.
