= John P. Anton =

American philosopher

John P. Anton (Greek: Ιωάννης Π. Αντωνόπουλος); November 2, 1920 – December 10, 2014) was a philosopher who was the Distinguished Professor Emeritus of Greek Philosophy and Culture at the University of South Florida. He was Corresponding Member of the Academy of Athens, Honorary Member of the Parnassos Literary Society, Honorary Member Phi Beta Kappa and a member of the Florida Philosophical Association. He received four Honorary Doctorates from: the University of Athens, the University of Patras, the University of Ioannina and the Aristotle University of Thessaloniki. His areas of specialization were classical Greek philosophy, History of Philosophy, American Philosophy, Philosophy of Art, and Metaphysics. He studied at Columbia University and earned his B.S, M.A. and Ph.D. in Philosophy, his mentors including John Herman Randall Jr. In 1973 he was one of the signers of the Humanist Manifesto II.

Anton authored ten books and edited eighteen books, among them Essays in Ancient Greek Philosophy (with A. Preus, five volumes, SUNY Press). He was the editor of the autobiographical work titled Upward Panic by Eva Palmer-Sikelianos. Anton was the Editor of the Twayne Series in the late 1980s and early edited Constantine Santas' Aristotelis Valaoritis in 1976, which was translated into Greek in 2012 by Fagottoe Books.

== Selected writings ==
- American Naturalism and Greek Philosophy, Humanity Books: Amherst, New York, 2005.
- Categories and Experience: Essays on Aristotelian Themes, Dowling College Press, 1996.
- The Poetry and Poetics of Constantine P. Cavafy: Aesthetic Visions of Sensual Reality, Chur, Switzerland: Harwood Academic Publishers, 1995.
- Aristotle's Theory of Contrariety, University Press of America, 1957.
