= Zorrie (novel) =

2021 novel by Laird Hunt

- Author: Laird Hunt
- Language: English
- Publisher: Bloomsbury Publishing
- Publication date: 2021
- Publication place: United States
- Pages: 176
- Awards: National Book Award (finalist)
- ISBN: 1635578434

Zorrie is a 2021 novel by Laird Hunt which follows the life of the titular character as she lives on a farm in rural Indiana during much of the 20th century. The book was a finalist for the 2021 National Book Award for Fiction with the judges calling it a "quiet and exquisitely crafted ballad of a book".

== Development ==
In an interview, Hunt stated that he drew inspiration for the novel from his teenaged years living with his grandmother on her farm in 1980s rural Indiana. Hunt said that he met many Zorries during his time on his grandmother's farm, whom he described as farm workers or retired teachers who were "fierce, smart, decent people".

== Plot ==
Zorrie Underwood is orphaned at an early age when both of her parents die of diphtheria. She is then raised by her divorced, bitter, elderly aunt, who is strict with Zorrie. Zorrie is a curious young girl, and eager to learn. She is one of the favorite pupils of her teacher, Mr. Thomas. However, she is pulled out of school at a young age to assist her aunt with sewing and other household chores. When Zorrie is 21, her aunt dies from a stroke. The house is repossessed by the bank to pay off significant debts her aunt had incurred, leaving Zorrie homeless. She works for others inconsistently and sleeps in barns during the Great Depression until finding a job at the Radium Dial Company in Ottawa, Illinois. There she befriends Janie and Marie. The workers at the factory paint radioactive radium dye onto clock and watch faces, and are told to point their paintbrushes using their lips. The girls from the factory are known as "Ghost Girls" as they glow from the radium when they go out on the town after working.

Months later, longing to return home, Zorrie returns to Clinton County, Indiana, where she eventually works for a married couple and meets their son Harold, whom she marries. Zorrie's only pregnancy ends in misscariage and this puts a strain on her new marriage. Harold enlists in the United States Army Air Forces during World War II and is killed when his bomber is shot down over Holland. Zorrie continues working diligently on her and Harold's farm to quell her grief. She remains lovingly close with the local community of farmers and townspeople. As the years pass, they attend church picnics, dinners at each other's homes, and read together. Zorrie develops a romantic attraction to Noah from a neighboring farm, and she proclaims her love for him but is rejected. Years later, now in old age, Zorrie takes a vacation to Holland vising a cemetery for Allied servicemen, the home of Anne Frank, and other landmarks. After 50 years of heavy labor on her farm Zorrie becomes more debilitated and requires frequent breaks where she would lie down in the front room of her house. Eventually, unable to work on her farm, she spends much of the day lying in her home. She sees her deceased loved ones throughout her life during her days; her friends Janie and Marie, her aunt, her husband Harold, her friends from the farming community; as they each visit her and place their hands on her back lovingly.

== Reception ==
Reviewing the work for The New York Times, author Alyson Hagy commended Hunt for finding beauty in the routine lives of people. She compared the novel to the artistic realism of Gustave Flaubert. Regarding Hunt's depiction of seemingly ordinary 20th-Century rural America, Hagy stated the novel's prose is where a "community becomes a 'symphony of souls,' a sustenance greater than romance or material wealth for those wise enough to join in." Author Anthony Doerr selected the novel as one of the best books of 2021 as one of The Guardian's guest authors.
