= Eryn Green =

American poet

- Education: University of Utah; University of Denver
- Writing career
- Genre: Poetry

Eryn Green is an American poet who in 2013, while a graduate student at the University of Denver, won the Yale Series of Younger Poets Competition. His collection Eruv was published by Yale University Press in 2014. His second collection of poetry, Beit, was awarded the 2019 Editor’s Choice from New Issues, and will be published in 2020.

== Biography ==
Green grew up in Park City, Utah. He received his MFA from the University of Utah (and was A&E editor for the Daily Utah Chronicle) and graduated with a Ph.D. in Creative Writing from the University of Denver in June 2013; he was 29 at the time. He wrote almost all of what would become Eruv, whose theme is wilderness, while a Ph.D. student. He studied at Denver with Eleni Sikelianos and Bin Ramke (the latter also a Yale Younger Poet). In addition to the Yale Younger Poets award he received a writing fellowship at the James Merrill House.

He is currently an Assistant Professor in Residence at the University of Nevada, Las Vegas (UNLV). He lives with his partner, poet Hanna Andrews, and their daughter.

Judge Carl Phillips wrote that Eruv

"reminds us how essential wilderness is to poetry—a wilderness in terms of how form and language both reinvent and get reinvented; meanwhile, the sensibility behind these poems points to another wilderness, the one that equals thinking about and feeling the world—its hurts, its joys—deeply and unabashedly, as we pass through it".

Besides Eruv, Green has published an essay in Esquire, and his poetry appeared in Jubilat and Painted Bride Quarterly.

== Works ==
- Eruv, New Haven : Yale University Press, 2014. ISBN 9780300201253, OCLC 862962133
- Beit, University of Chicago Press, ISBN 9781936970667
