= Daedalus in Crete =

Daedalus in Crete (Greek: Δαίδαλος στην Κρήτη) is a play by the Greek lyric poet and playwright Angelos Sikelianos entirely written and published at the journal Nea Estia (written in 1942 and published in 1943, which makes it the second tragedy of Sikelianos given to the public, as its publication precedes “Sibylla” which may have been written earlier but was published at the end of the Occupation), during the Axis occupation of Greece. This event may be linked to trump the planned and announced project - not completed - on behalf of Sikelianos, to write the tragedies "Daedalus in Sicily" and "Ariadne".

== Plot ==
The dramatis personae and the plot of this play come from the - rich in mythical material - era of Minoan Crete. King Minos, Queen Pasiphae, the craftsman from Athens Daedalus and his son, Icarus, are the protagonists of this play (priests of Mother-Goddess and Jupiter-Taurus, chorus of warriors, priestesses and prisoners are also present).

Minos, a representative-symbol of the emerging patriarchal religion and oppression of his subjects (representing evil and tyranny in general) tries to sideline the existing matriarchal cult of Mother-Goddess (the primordial matriarchal worldview of the Minoans, represented by the persona of Pasiphae, a sensitive female figure) and kill – as a tribute - the envoys sent from Athens (including Theseus), being himself now transformed into a bestial Minotaur (symbol of absolute male brutal force acting on a dual level: authoritarian and sexually). Finally, the technician (the artist, the critical force that will symbolically resist to the arbitrariness and violence of power, as a free and revolutionary spirit which wants to awaken the people) Daedalus will organize a mutiny to prevent the suffering while Theseus will release the captives and will cancel the plans of Minos.

The final scene (the palace and the entire city of Knossos are being burnt) is equally dramatical with a tragedy (containing profound connections with ancient Greek tragedy), Daedalus and his son Icarus will escape flying with artificial wings (like the homonymous legend).

This play has diverse multifaceted connections with ancient tragedy - especially those written by Aeschylus – in terms of structure, motifs, form, always modified and used according to the theatrical and conceptual targeting and aspirations of Sikelianos. For example, the presentation of all the leading dramatis personae (especially Minos and Pasiphae) as masks of the archetype "Dionysos" (which applies to all the tragedies and the general perception of the core of tragedy by Sikelianos) and their gradual integration into this archetypal figure through a process of initiation, the motif of tragic silence and the apollonian – initially – chorus that completes the drama, breaking the straight course of Time and making the return to the Earth and Life, the identification of Pasiphae with Moon on a symbolic level. A prominent role in the play`s motifs play the "three nights", which are the key stages in the spiritual evolution of Daedalus (who is also a poet and philosopher as an artist).

A major issue that researchers were focused on is the relationship with the novel by Merezhkovsky "The Birth of Gods. Tutankhamen in Crete", which moves in the same environment and mythical world. In summary, apart from any (easily identifiable and widely accepted) common symbols and motifs, the Merezhkovsky addresses the core of the play with religious thought and willingness to compromise the historical and philosophical-spiritual disputes arising from the clash of the primitive matriarchal with the patriarchal element via a sequence that leads to the spirit of Christianity (within this mythical scenery), non-relating, and thus linking with the historical -and political - significations of Sikelianos, powered by the timeless social injustice, the domination of the authoritarian element (the barbaric male within the confines of patriarchy) and updating of the myth in the contemporary historical context (the conqueror is identified with violence and power at the same time).
