= Sibylla (Sikelianos) =

Sibylla is a tragedy written by Angelos Sikelianos. It was written in 1940, a few months before the Greco-Italian War and published in 1944, a few months before the liberation of Athens, in the journal Nea Estia.

== Plot ==
One of the main scenes of the play is the visit of Nero at the oracle of Delphi to take the oracle by Sibylla, priestess of the Oracle, and the reactions of the latter. This work, unlike his first one, the Dithyramb of Rose, is a complete tragedy, in terms of genre and structure: with distinct and complete parts both in the dialogue and chorus parts as well as in the plot and characters. The messages of the time for resistance against the oncoming storm and the pursuit of freedom and human dignity through struggle that the work depicts are portrayed through a dense dramaturgical and finely processed storyline of symbolic relations, influences and elements of ancient drama. A vast number of structures and textual (vocative or expressive) sequences can be found in "Sibylla" all of which can be attributed to ancient tragedy (for instance the way that the landscape of Delphi is depicted is similar to certain tragedies on the same topic).

Sibylla (and the other characters) as a prophetess, also expresses and symbolizes the Greek spirit and conscience against the Roman roughness (during the time of the plot), as well as against the spirit of the conqueror in general (an allegorical approach, based on the historical circumstances at the time of writing of the play).

The play expresses personal ideas of Sikelianos, similar to the ideas of his time, expressed through the theatrical garb of ancient tragedy and the elements that are traditionally used in tragedies (religious, psychological and other). What is important for the understanding of the play are the concepts of the "mantosyni" (the art of oracle as an inner power, spiritually superior to the other inner powers of every man) a property that Sibylla has as a mythical figure and symbol and also the concept of the combination of the Apollonian and the Dionysian element (the individual, logic-wise, prophetic, cult of Apollo in connection with the collective, bacchic-frenzied, ecstatic, joyful worship of Dionysus, cults that were in stark contrast before the advent of Dionysus in Delphi).
