= The Death of Digenis =

Tragedy by Angelos Sikelianos published in 1947

The Death of Digenis or Christ Unbound (Ο θάνατος του Διγενή ή Χριστός Λυόμενος) is a tragedy by Angelos Sikelianos written and published in 1947. Three years later, in 1950, the music of the play was written following a cooperation between Manos Hadjidakis and Sikelianos.

== Plot ==
The work focuses on the last moments of Digenis Akritas. Sikelianos uses the acritic cycle (frontiersmen tales) for the historical material (i.e. the conditions and some historical figures of the time, such as the Byzantine Emperors Michael III and Basil I) and the image of Digenis, whom he places as leader of a heretic group of paulician warriors, adjusting and transforming the historical material according to his own dramaturgical and ideological objectives (particularly the importance of the hero's tomb and other relevant issues).

Mainly due to its second name, this tragedy has been associated with the third part of the lost Promethean trilogy by Aeschylus, Prometheus Unbound, with Digenis being presented by Sikelianos with the same characteristics: a social and cultural fighter - revolutionary for the good of the people – Prometheus, more or less, offers culture to mankind – a hero that links Christ and Prometheus, while there are other scholars’ opinions that consider Hercules top have served as a model, as well as Oedipus (mainly in relation to the issue of the initiation of the hero and his death - as the return to Mother Earth). In general, ancient Greek tragedy - not only the lost Promethean trilogy - has been used by Sikelianos for the rendering of other persons through an implicit link with characters of ancient drama (Emperor Michael III, Monk Hilarion).

The scene with the impious communion of Digenis is considered to be the centre of the play (some Orthodox symbols are being declared void in a "blasphemous" way – for example the cross, the symbolism of which is sought to change from a symbol of martyrdom into a "tree of life", set in a natural habitat of unsurpassed beauty, which is also the set for the death of Digenis. Perhaps this is a way to demonstrate the heretical thought of the Paulicians).
