= Tecmessa (daughter of Teleutas) =

Concubine of Ajax the Greater

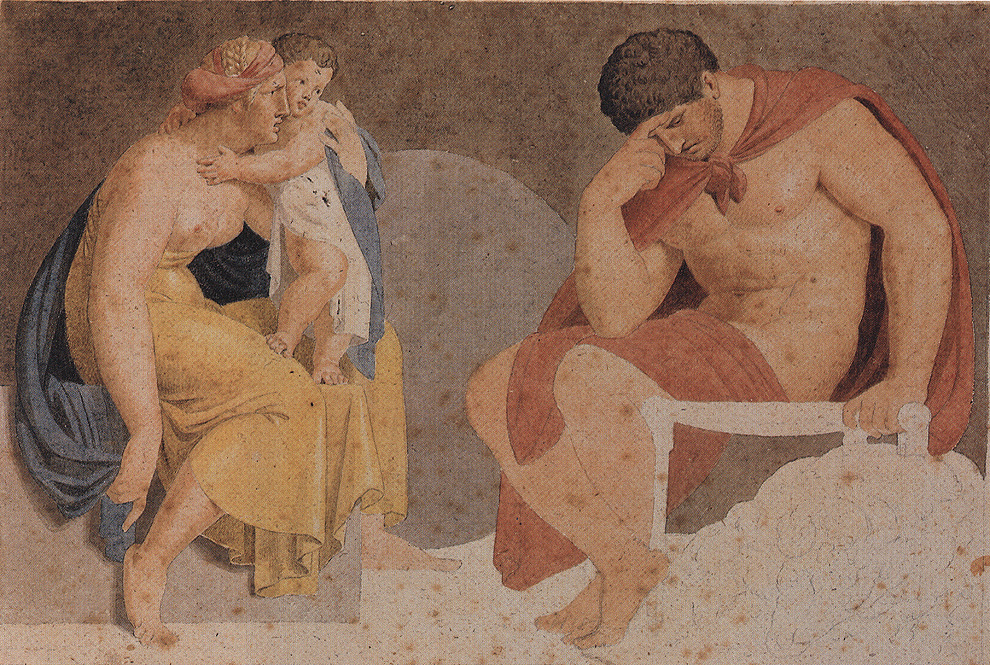
Tecmessa, Eurysaces and Ajax by Jakob Carstens, 1791.

In Greek mythology, Tecmessa (Ancient Greek: Τέκμησσα, romanized: Tékmēssa) is a princess from Phrygia, a region in western Asia Minor, daughter of king Teleutas. During the Trojan War Tecmessa's homeland was raided by the Greeks, and Tecmessa herself became a war-prize of Ajax the Greater, one of the strongest Greek warriors. Tecmessa comforted Ajax after his divine-induced madness caused him to attack herds, and mourned his death when he decided to kill himself.

Tecmessa is mostly known from her appearance in the ancient Greek tragedy Ajax, a play by Sophocles, in which she tries to dissuade the shame-stricken Ajax from killing himself, and grieves his demise when she fails.

== Family ==
The Phrygian princess Tecmessa was the daughter of King Teleutas, king of Phrygia (or Teuthras, the king of Teuthrania in nearby Mysia).

== Mythology ==
During the ten-year long Trojan War the Greek army sacked several cities in the northwestern coast of Asia Minor. During one of those raids Ajax the Greater killed the king, captured Tecmessa, enamored with her great beauty, and kept her as a concubine. They had a son, Eurysaces. Ajax having taken his own prize is an element as early as Homer, though the concubine herself does not appear in his works, nor is her name mentioned. Despite her status being less than that of a legally married wife, Tecmessa's relationship with Ajax was defined by respect and fidelity.

=== Ajax ===
Tecmessa's largest role is in Ajax, a mid-fifth century BC play by the Athenian playwright Sophocles. After the goddess Athena drove the revenge-seeking Ajax mad, he left his tent with the aim to kill Odysseus and the two Atreides while Tecmessa advised him to stay inside; nevertheless he ignored her. Due to Athena's curse, he mistook a herd of cattle and a flock of sheep for his perceived enemies and attacked them. He carried the animals back to the tent, and Tecmessa watched him slaughter and whip them one by one until his frenzy was over. The anguished Tecmessa then ran to Ajax's sailors and crewmen to inform them of their master's madness. The sober Ajax joined them soon, terribly shaken by his actions and begging the rest to put him out of his misery. Tecmessa and the sailors tried to comfort him and speak him out of his suicidal thoughts, with Tecmessa reminding him of her precarious position as a slave, and the dire fate that awaited her and their young son Eurysaces should he perish. Her words however did little to motivate Ajax.

A messenger from Ajax's half-brother Teucer arrived next, instructing them not to let Ajax venture out of his tent, as Teucer had been informed by the seer Calchas that he would not see his brother alive again unless Ajax stayed inside the whole day. Tecmessa in horror then realised that the tent was empty and Ajax was gone, and decided to go out looking for him. Meanwhile the depressed Ajax put an end to his life with his own sword, once gifted to him by Hector. It was Tecmessa who discovered the body, and then greatly mourned his death, in time joined by Teucer. Tecmessa used her robe as funerary shroud for him to conceal the body from prying eyes and together with their son paid due to the dead man by placing strands of their own hair as offering.

=== Other authors ===
Tecmessa drops from the Trojan War narrative after Ajax's death, and she is usually ignored by other authors; her son Eurysaces eventually embarked for his father's homeland Salamis, but Tecmessa is not necessarily always with him. Servius writes that Telamon exiled Teucer not because of Ajax's suicide, but rather because he thought Teucer did not bring Tecmessa and Eurysaces along, who in fact arrived in Salamis later on a different ship.

== Iconography ==
A red-figure lekythos of about 460 BC depicts a woman, apparently Tecmessa, spreading a cloak over Ajax's dead body.

== See also ==
- Briseis
- Chryseis
- Tisiphone

== Bibliography ==
- Bell, Robert E. (1991). Women of Classical Mythology: A Biographical Dictionary. ABC-Clio. ISBN 9780874365818.
- Gantz, Timothy (1996). Early Greek Myth: A Guide to Literary and Artistic Sources. Vol. II. Johns Hopkins University Press. ISBN 978-0-8018-5362-3.
- Grimal, Pierre (1987). The Dictionary of Classical Mythology. Wiley-Blackwell. ISBN 0-631-13209-0.
- Hard, Robin (2004). The Routledge Handbook of Greek Mythology: Based on H. J. Rose's "Handbook of Greek Mythology". Routledge. ISBN 9780415186360.
- Homer, The Iliad with an English Translation by A.T. Murray, PhD in two volumes. Cambridge, MA., Harvard University Press; London, William Heinemann, Ltd. 1924. Online version at the Perseus Digital Library.
- March, Jennifer R. (May 31, 2014). Dictionary of Classical Mythology. Oxbow Books. ISBN 978-1-78297-635-6.
- Roman, Luke; Roman, Monica (2010). Encyclopedia of Greek and Roman Mythology. Infobase Publishing. ISBN 9781438126395.
- Seyffert, Oskar (1901). Nettleship, Henry; Sandys, J. E. (eds.). A Dictionary of Classical Antiquities, Mythology, Religion, Literature and Art. S. Sonnenschein.
- Smith, William (1873). A Dictionary of Greek and Roman Biography and Mythology. London, UK: John Murray, printed by Spottiswoode and Co. Online version at the Perseus.tufts library.
- Sophocles, Ajax, edited with introduction and notes by Sir Richard Jebb. Sir Richard Jebb. Cambridge. Cambridge University Press. 1893. Online text available at the Perseus Digital Library.
- Tripp, Edward (June 1970). Crowell's Handbook of Classical Mythology (1st ed.). Thomas Y. Crowell Co. ISBN 069022608X.
