= Eurysaces =

Greek mythological figure

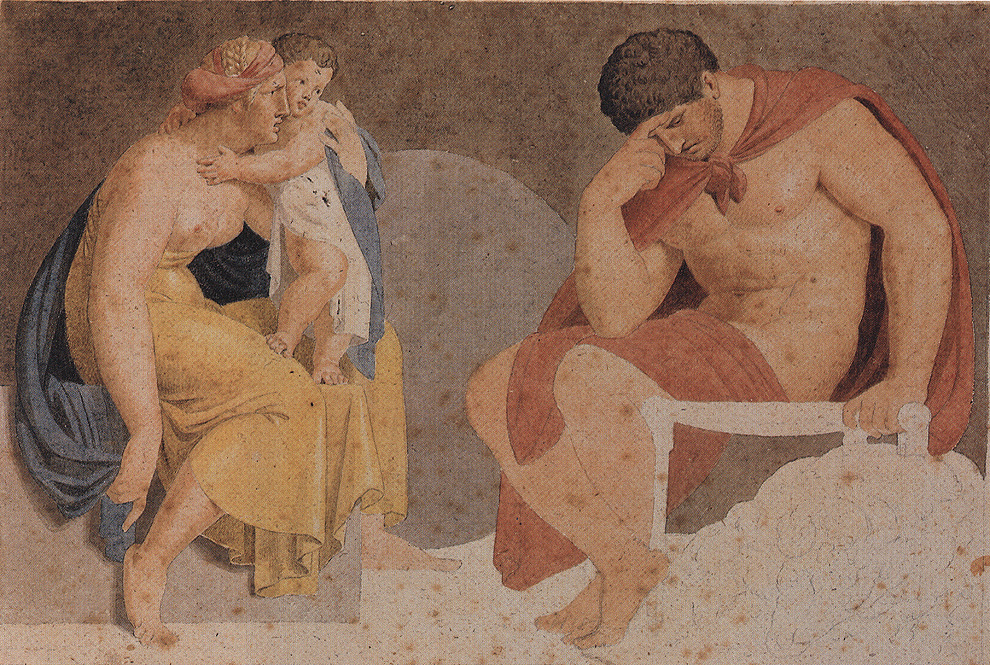
Tecmessa, Eurysaces and Ajax by Jakob Carstens, 1791.

Eurysaces (Ancient Greek: Εὐρυσάκης) in Greek mythology was the son of the Ajax and the enslaved former Teuthranian princess Tecmessa. He was venerated in Athens. Eurysaces was named after his father's famous shield. In Sophocles' tragedy Ajax, the protagonist hands the shield to his young son before committing suicide.

Eurysaces was then taken to Ajax's native land, Salamis Island, and he soon became king there. Eurysaces's uncle Teucer, founded the town of Salamis on Cyprus, and later attempted to return to the island, but he was repelled by Eurysaces. Teucer later established Galacia in Spain. Sophocles wrote a play titled Eurysaces, but only one quotation from it survives.

== See also ==
- The asteroid 8317 Eurysaces
