= Studiobühne Siegburg =

Theater

Coordinates: 50°48′01″N 7°12′20″E

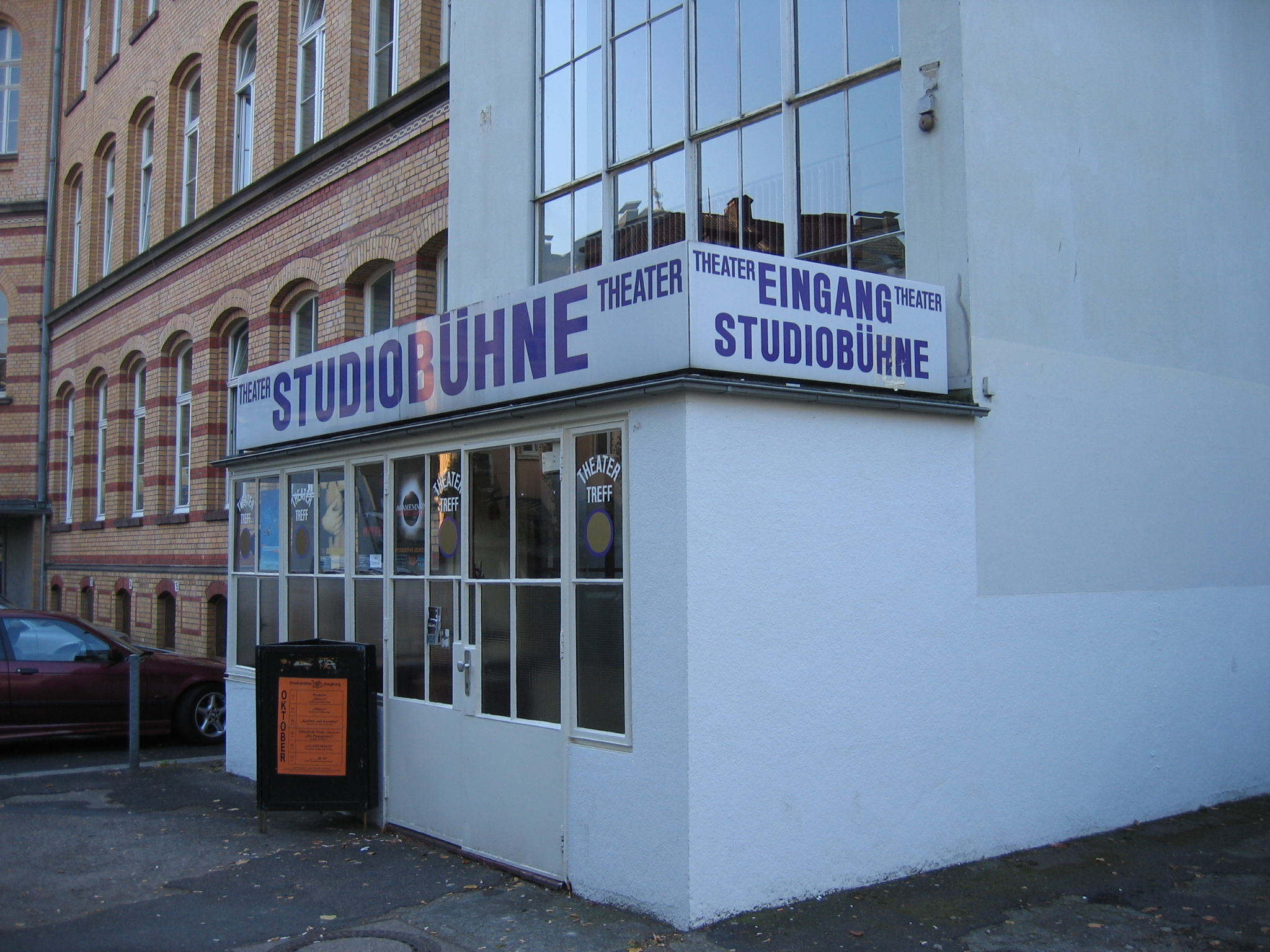
Studiobühne, Entrance

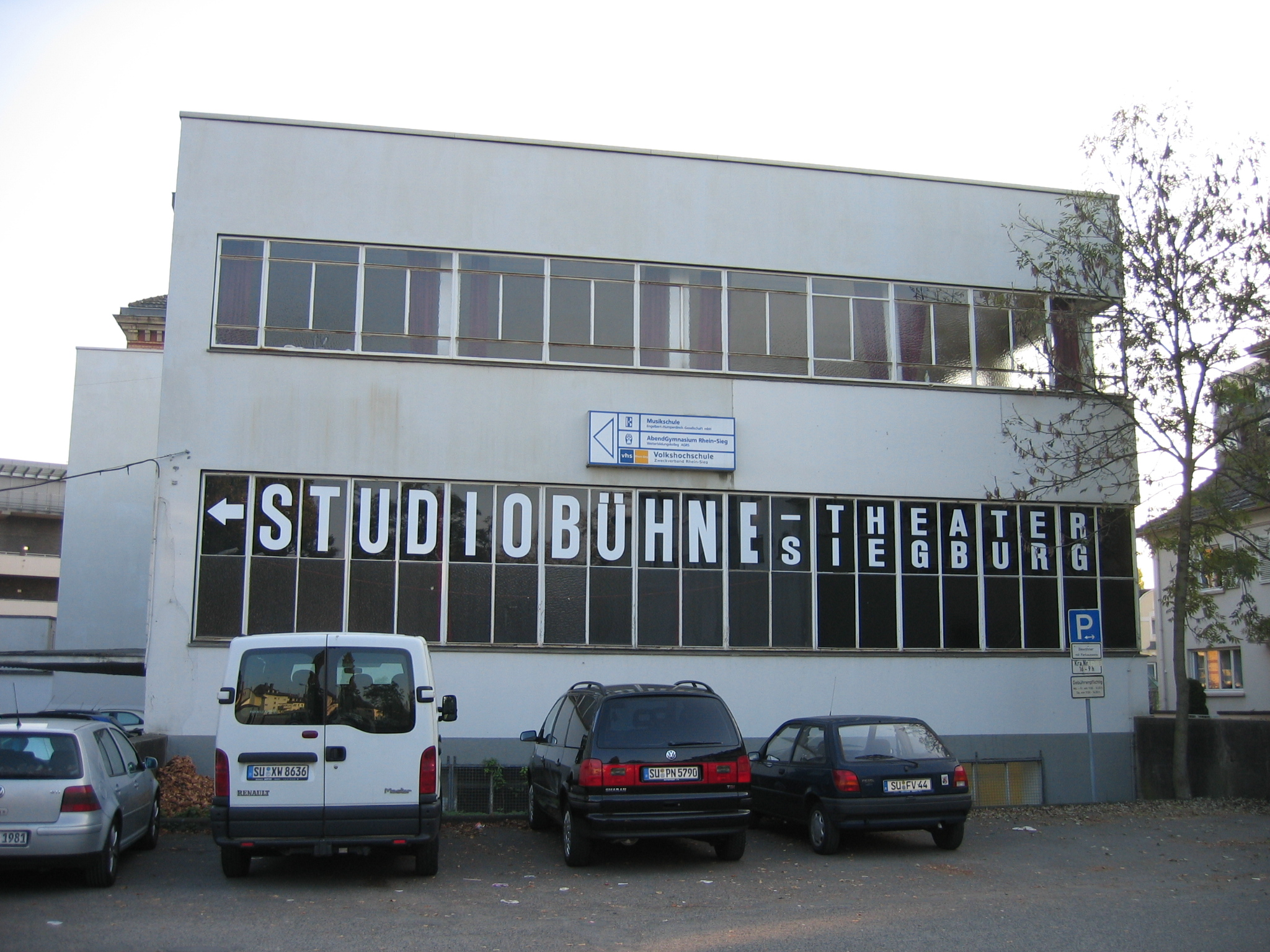
Studiobühne, Side view

Studiobühne Siegburg is a privately owned theatre in the city of Siegburg in North Rhine-Westphalia, Germany.
