= Dunya Ramicova =

American costume designer

- Born: October 11, 1950 (age 76); Bratislava, Czechoslovakia
- Occupations: Costume designer, academic
- Years active: 1970s–present

Academic background
- Education: Yale School of Drama (M.F.A.) Goodman School of Drama (B.F.A.)

Academic work
- Discipline: Costume design
- Institutions: University of California, Los Angeles; University of California, Santa Barbara; University of California, Merced

Dunya Ramicova (born October 11, 1950) is an Emmy Award-winning costume designer and distinguished professor emeritus at the University of California, Merced. At the university, she served as a founding faculty member, and was the Richard P. and Susan Kiphart Costume Designer Endowed Chair.

== Ear;y life and education ==
Ramicova was born in Bratislava, Czechoslovakia on October 11, 1950. She immigrated to the United States in 1968, and studied at the Goodman School of Drama and the Yale School of Drama.

== Career ==
Ramicova built a career designing costumes for over 150 productions at major opera houses, theaters, and performing arts venues worldwide, including the Metropolitan Opera, Royal Opera House, and San Francisco Opera.

In 2014, she donated a collection of over 2,000 of her drawings and costume designs to the University of California, Merced, which would become the Dunya Ramicova Costume Design Collection. They compose her life's wok, and were digitized into the Online Archive of California.
