= First Delphic Festival =

1927 event in Delphi, Greece

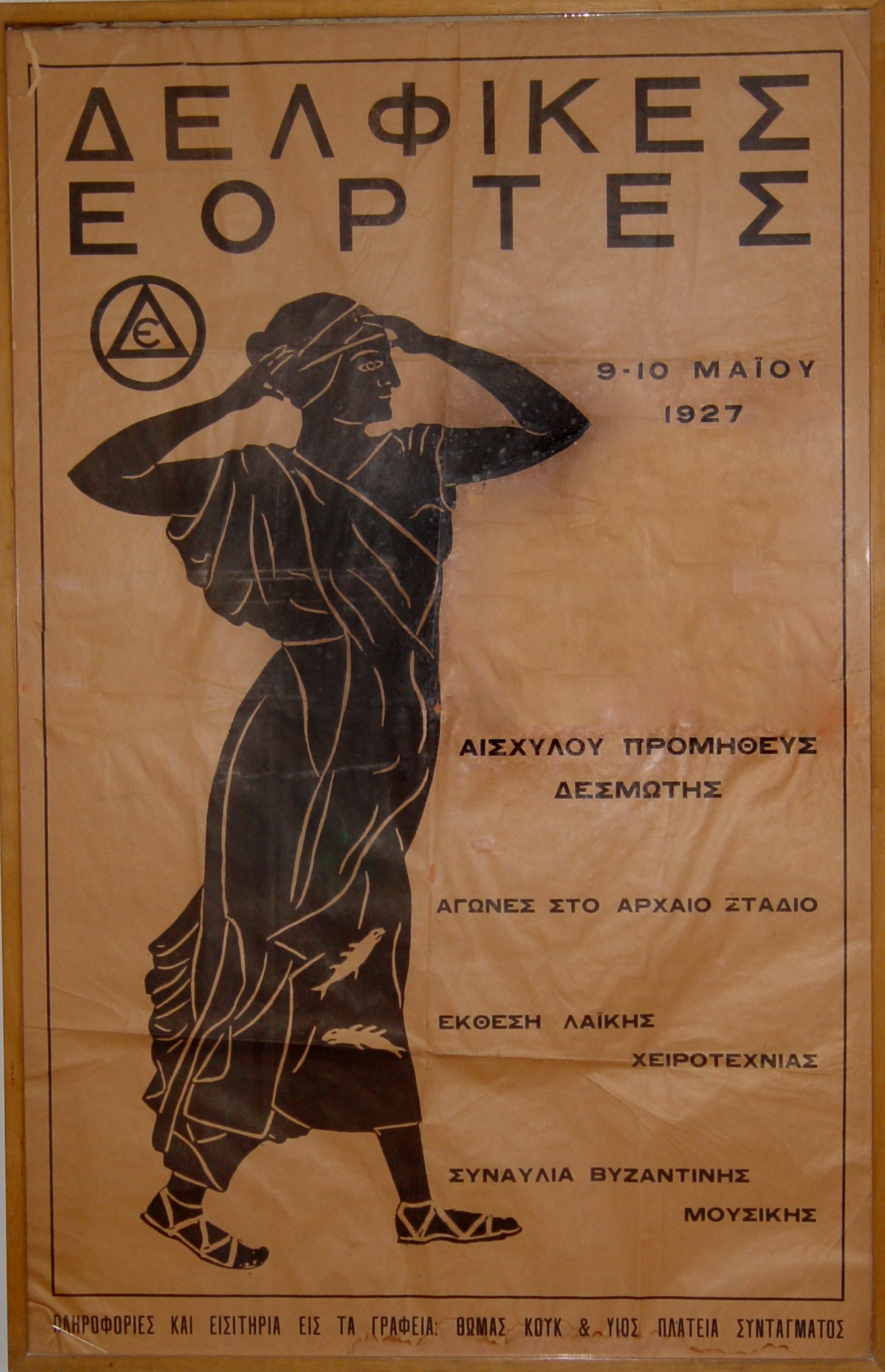
Poster of the Delphic Festival, 1927

The 1927 First Delphic Festival was held on May 9 and 10, 1927 at the initiative of Angelos and Eva Sikelianos, and consisted of a series of events in the archaeological site of Delphi. The Delphic Festival was inspired by the ideals adopted by Sikelianos and Eva Palmer, focusing on the solidarity of people all over the world and of mutual respect. The Sikelianos couple believed that Delphi could actually serve as a focal point for this global understanding, due to the Amphictyony which had been established there for centuries. They built a house in the region and prepared the celebrations which were about to have an international calibre. The entire endeavor was funded by the Sikelianos couple and was repeated two times (1927 and 1930), a fact which exhausted them financially and soon led them to separation.

== First Day (May 9, 1927) ==
The festival began with a tour of the foreign visitors in the archaeological site and the Museum of Delphi guided by Greek and foreign archaeologists, who were charged with the task of explaining the importance (both historical and aesthetic) of the monuments and ruins, which had relatively recently been revealed. Then (at 1 pm, according to the program) breakfast was offered, accompanied by traditional Greek music ("kleftika songs") by villagers and the tour continued. At 4 p.m. the signal to the visitors to gather in the ancient theater was given by someone standing at the top of the Phaedriades, so that the three main events of the first day could follow: the hymn to Apollo would be performed by the choir and orchestra (as an opening act), the tragedy Aeschylus' Prometheus Bound would be presented and, finally, Angelos Sikelianos, the founder of the Festival, would speak to the public for the purpose of the Delphic Organization in antiquity and today. The first day was concluded with a dinner (at 8 pm); then, those visitors who had come by boat were escorted down to Itea to their ships.

== Second Day (May 10, 1927) ==
The second day started with a morning visit to the Delphi Artisan Fair, where Eva Sikelianos talked about the importance of folk art and about the value of the work on the loom, of which she was particularly fond. At 11 a.m. a speech on the Ancient Theatre was delivered in German by the archaeologist Wilhelm Dörpfeld and at 1 p.m breakfast was served to the guests. Then at around 3 pm, two events took place: the athletic games at the ancient stadium (in which students in various disciplines participated by practicing the ancient pentathlon along with sports teams from the cities of Thessaloniki and Desfina) and the ancient Pyrrhichios war dance performed by 'warriors'dancers dressed in armors, under the guidance of Athanasios Veloudios to the sounds of the music composed by Constantine Psachos. At 7 p.m. a dinner followed and at 8 p.m. a performance of Byzantine choir music at the Ancient Theatre concluded the day. The weekend would be concluded with a dance-theatre performance, a mimic representation of the Septeria (the battle between Apollo and Python) by the "famous dancer of ancient Greek dances", Vassos, and the "mime" Tanagra Kanellos (both Greek expatriates who came from the US for this purpose) with the repetition of the hymn to Apollo in the end. The departure of the foreign visitors was accompanied by a torch relay on the Sacred Way (Hiera Odos) by athletes with torches who would light the way so the visitors could descend towards Itea.
