= Eva Palmer-Sikelianos =

American scholar of Greece (1874–1952)

Eva Palmer
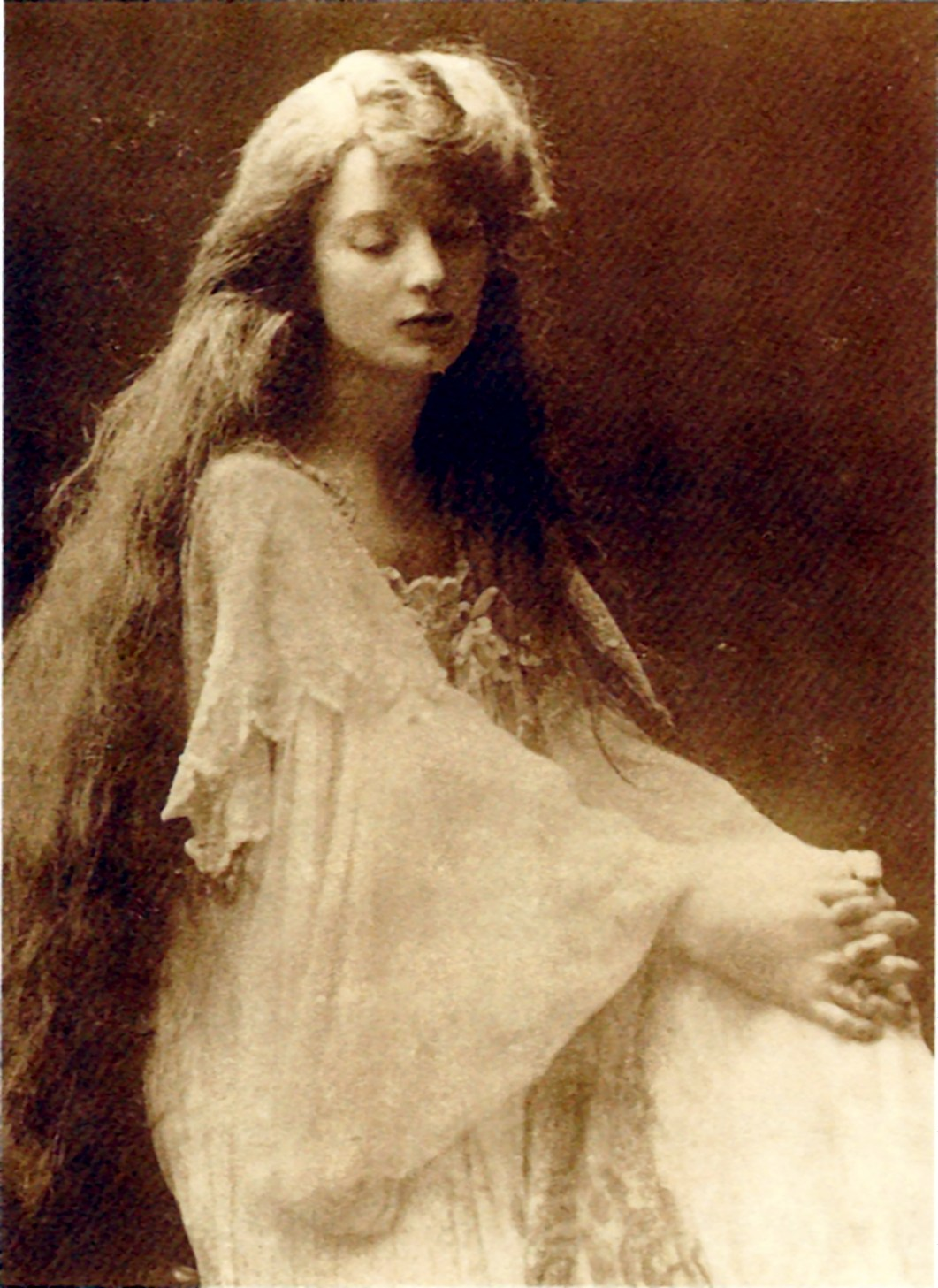
- Born: Evelina Palmer; January 9, 1874; Gramercy Park, New York City, U.S.
- Died: June 4, 1952 (aged 78); Delphi, Greece
- Occupations: Student, lecturer, choreographer, festival organizer
- Spouse: Angelos Sikelianos (m. 1907; annul. 1934)
- Children: 1

Evelina "Eva" Palmer (Greek: Εύα Πάλμερ-Σικελιανού; January 9, 1874 – June 4, 1952) was an American woman notable for her study and promotion of Classical Greek culture, weaving, theater, choral dance, and music.

Palmer's life intersected with numerous noteworthy artists. She was both inspired by and an inspiration to dancers Isadora Duncan and Ted Shawn, the French novelist Colette, the poet and author Natalie Barney, and the actress Sarah Bernhardt.

She married Angelos Sikelianos, a Greek poet and playwright. Together they organized a revival of the Delphic Festival in Delphi, Greece. Via festivals of art, music, and theater, she hoped to promote peace and harmony in Greece and beyond.

== Early life ==
Evelina Palmer was born on January 9, 1874, at Gramercy Park in New York City to Courtlandt Palmer Sr. and Catherine Amory Bennett. She was one of five children in a family of eclectic intellectuals and gifted artists.

The family she was born into promoted liberal thought, unconventional education, and exploration of music, theater, and literature. Her earliest memories were of her father's Nineteenth Century Club, whose early meetings were held at the Palmer home. The Nineteenth Century Club brought together people of disparate political ideologies and religious backgrounds. Her father facilitated discussions of politics, religion, and morality. Palmer's father died in the summer of 1888 of appendicitis. Her mother later married Robert Abbe.

During the family's summer vacations at Bar Harbor, Maine, she became acquainted with Natalie Barney. The two shared interests in poetry, literature, and horseback riding. Barney likened Palmer to a medieval virgin. The two would become lovers and later neighbors in Paris.

Palmer's siblings were formative in her life, in particular her brother, Courtlandt Palmer Jr. He was a musical prodigy and could at a young age play at the piano most all of the works of renowned composers. All of the Palmer siblings were either exposed to or encouraged to pursue musical endeavors. Palmer went on to study music theory and Greek choral arrangements independently.

Palmer was enrolled in various boarding schools and day schools, sporadically and for brief periods of time, then attended Bryn Mawr College. While at Bryn Mawr, she studied literature and theater. She left the school before completing a degree, instead choosing to join her brother Palmer Jr. in Rome for a year and studying independently.

== Paris ==
Palmer settled in Neuilly, an expatriate neighborhood near Paris, where she spent her time learning French, attending theater shows, and participating in impromptu theatrical performances at fêtes in Natalie Barney's garden. At one of these fêtes, Palmer performed Pierre Louÿs' Dialogue au Soleil Couchant with Colette.

During this time, she met Sarah Bernhardt and was asked to perform with her on stage, an arrangement that ultimately fell through. During a brief spell in London, Palmer was asked to join the theater company of Mrs. Patrick Campbell. Campbell's pre-condition to Palmer joining the company was that she publicly disassociate herself from Natalie Barney. Palmer turned down the offer.

In Paris, Palmer also became acquainted with Raymond Duncan, the brother of Isadora Duncan, and his wife Penelope. Due to labor unrest in Paris in 1905, the Duncans and their baby came to stay with Palmer in Neuilly. They shared an interest in handmade clothing and Greek art.

In an attempt to reproduce authentic Greek robes, the trio built a loom. Palmer consequently abandoned traditional dress of the time in favor of dresses and leather sandals she made herself. The Duncans and Palmer would later leave Paris for Greece.

== Greece ==
Palmer and the Duncans initially settled in the foothills of the Hymettos mountains, five miles east of Athens. Here, Penelope arranged for Palmer to meet her brother, poet and playwright Angelos Sikelianos. Despite a language barrier Palmer and Sikelianos began dating. During this time, the pair began to plan a Delphic Festival. Through art, music, and theater, they hoped to inspire harmony among people of different ethnic, religious, and political backgrounds.

The couple was married in Bar Harbor, Maine, on September 9, 1907. Palmer assumed a hyphenated surname: Eva Palmer-Sikelianos. Her friendship with Barney did not survive her marriage. Barney feared the loss of Palmer in Sikelianos, while Palmer tired of a lifestyle in Paris she increasingly viewed as frivolous. Their friendship would later be repaired by an exchange of letters.

Palmer and Sikelianos settled in Athens, where they had a son, Glafkos. The family also kept a vacation home on the island of Lefkas. In Athens, Palmer studied Greek Ecclesiastical music and notation under Konstantinos Psachos. Using Palmer's own money as well as donations, Palmer and Psachos commissioned the creation of a specialized harmonium called the Evion Panharmonium, named for one of the donors who funded its creation. It is believed the instrument was destroyed during World War II, though Psachos thought two smaller versions were brought back to Greece by Psachos.

== First Delphic Festival ==
On May 9, 1927, Palmer and Sikelianos held their first Delphic Festival. It ran for several days and included a production of Prometheus Bound, performed amid the ruins of the theater at Delphi, an athletic competition at the stadium, and an assembly of local handicrafts in the nearby village. Palmer produced Prometheus Bound, directing the play, training the Greek chorus, and weaving all of the costumes from scratch. Psachos was recruited to produce the music for the play.

One feature of the athletic performances was the Pyrrhic Dance. The Greek Ministry of War and Alexandros Mazarakis-Ainian supported the performance and provided tents, trucks, and other supplies needed to carry out the festival.

The play and athletic competitions were recorded by the Greek filmmaker Dimitrios Gaziadis. The film, titled Prometheus in Chains, was reproduced in 1971.

== Second Delphic Festival ==
The positive reception of the first festival led to support from the Greek government for subsequent festivals. A national lottery was formed to both pay off the debts of the first festival and to pay for the second Delphic Festival. When it came time to print the tickets for the lottery, the effort was stymied; the Minister of the Navy feared that funds people spent on lottery tickets would go the festival rather than in support of the Navy.

Disillusioned, Palmer traveled to America for a year. She lectured at various schools and universities and wrote several papers on the topics embodied by the Delphic Festival. She was asked to stay on and teach the Greek choruses she had directed in Prometheus Bound at Yale University. She turned down the offer.

Palmer returned to Europe, at first to Paris and then to Greece in the autumn of 1929, and began again to plan the second Delphic Festival. It is unclear if the issue of the Delphic Lottery and the Ministry of the Navy was resolved and how the festival was ultimately paid for.

She and Sikelianos chose The Suppliants as the featured play. Psachos was again asked to write the music for the play, but he and Palmer disagreed on the artistic vision. Psachos eventually withdrew from the production; the two would not speak again. Both the athletic competitions and an exhibition of handicrafts were again part of the festival, which took place in 1930.

After the festival, Palmer returned to the United States. Her marriage with Sikelianos was annulled in 1934. The two continued to exchange correspondence and remained on good terms.

== United States ==
Palmer was invited to join the Federal Theater Project in New York, a New Deal program to employ out-of-work artists, writers, and directors. Under this project, she worked on the production of a performance of The Persians by Aeschylus, a comedy based on a Greek play by Aristophanes, and a Christmas play. Due to conflicts within the project, none of these efforts came to fruition, and Palmer was eventually dismissed from the program.

In January 1939, Palmer watched a dance performance at Irving Washington High School in New York, Dance of Ages by Ted Shawn. She saw in the performance a shared artistic vision; she and Shawn would become collaborators. Palmer taught Shawn's dance troupe her interpretation of Greek chorus and produced costumes from her loom. The two went on to produce several performances, staged in New York and Florida.

== Upward Panic ==
Palmer's autobiography, Upward Panic, was assembled and edited by John P. Anton. She began writing her autobiography in 1938 and continued on and off again through 1948.

"Upward panic" describes the rising exhilaration experienced at the culmination of tragic drama, music and dance. She and Sikelianos believed that the pursuit of these arts would lead people towards peace and understanding of each other.

== Death and legacy ==
Palmer returned to Greece in the spring of 1952. Two weeks after her arrival, she suffered a fatal stroke while attending a theatrical performance in Delphi. She was 78 years old. She was buried at Delphi.

Palmer's Delphic Idea lives on through the International Delphic Council.
