= Angelos Sikelianos =

Greek poet and writer (1884–1951)

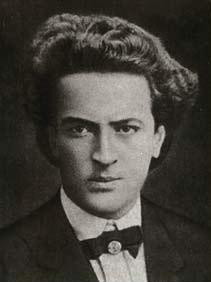
- Born: 28 March 1884; Lefkada, Greece
- Died: 19 June 1951 (aged 67); Athens, Greece
- Occupation: Poet
- Spouses: Eva Palmer-Sikelianos (m. 1907; annul. 1934) Anna Karamani (m. 1940)
- Children: 1
- Relatives: Raymond Duncan (brother-in-law)

Angelos Sikelianos (Greek: Άγγελος Σικελιανός [sikeʎaˈnos]; 28 March 1884 – 19 June 1951) was a Greek lyric poet and playwright. His themes include Greek history, religious symbolism as well as universal harmony in poems such as The Moonstruck, Prologue to Life, Mother of God, and Delphic Utterance. His plays include Sibylla, Daedalus in Crete, Christ in Rome, The Death of Digenis, The Dithyramb of the Rose and Asclepius. Although occasionally his grandiloquence blunts the poetic effect of his work, some of Sikelianos finer lyrics are among the best in Western literature. Every year from 1946 to 1951, he was nominated for the Nobel Prize for Literature.

== Biography ==
Sikelianos was born in Lefkada where he spent his childhood. In 1900, he registered to the Athens Law School but never graduated.

In the course of the following years, he traveled extensively and devoted himself to poetry. In 1907, he married the American Eva Palmer in the United States; the couple moved to Athens in 1908. During that period, Sikelianos came in contact with Greek intellectuals, and in 1909 he published his first collection of poems, Alafroískïotos (The Moonstruck), which had an immediate impact and was recognized by critics as an important work.

He also befriended fellow writer Nikos Kazantzakis, and in 1914 they spent forty days on Mount Athos, visiting most of the monasteries there and living the life of ascetics. The following year, they embarked on a pilgrimage through Greece. The two writers were kindred spirits, but also very different in their respective views on life. Sikelianos was a man of the world, full of optimism, and with a steadfast faith in his abilities as a writer. Kazantzakis was the taciturn and reclusive counterpart who was doubt-ridden, and had, as he himself admitted, a tendency to focus on the skull behind the face. Together, however, they shared the mutual concern of attempting to refine and elevate the human spirit through artistic pursuits.

== The Delphic Festivals ==
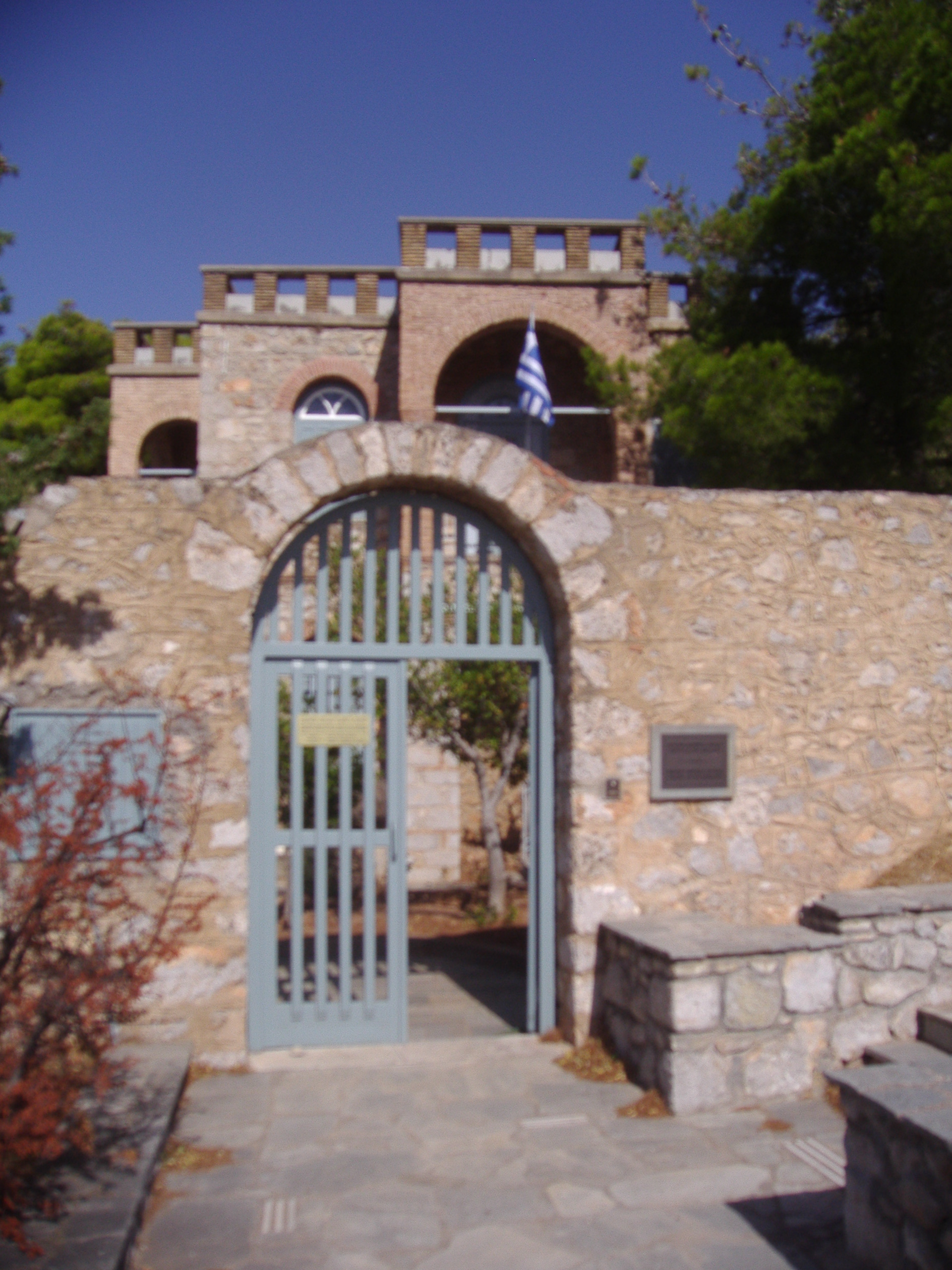
The house of Sikelianos in Delphi.

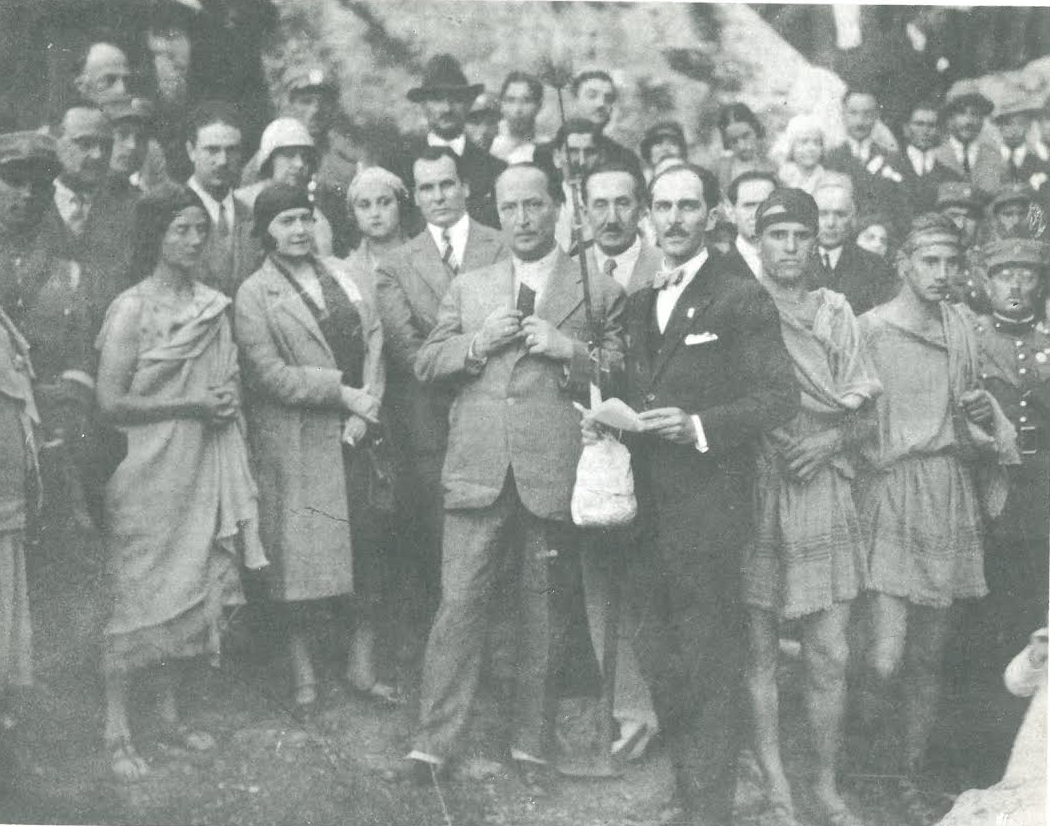
Sikelianos (at the front) during the Delphic Festival of 1930.

In May 1927, in collaboration with his wife, Eva Palmer-Sikelianos, Sikelianos held the Delphic Festival as part of his general effort towards a revival of the "Delphic Idea". Sikelianos believed that the principles which had shaped classical civilization if reexamined, could offer spiritual independence and serve as a means of communication among people. The event consisted of athletic contests (in classical fashion, reminiscent of the Pythian Games) a concert of Byzantine music, an exhibition of folk art as well as a performance of Prometheus Bound. The Delphic Festivals were acclaimed by critics (many of them invited to attend) and despite a lack of state assistance, they were repeated three years later. The revival was then permanently abandoned due to the excessive organization costs. In honor of the memory of Angelos and Eva Sikelianos, the European Cultural Centre of Delphi bought and restored their house in Delphi, which is today the Museum of Delphic Festivals. Later, Eva Palmer-Sikelianos left for the United States, and Sikelianos married Anna Karamani.

== Later life, death, and legacy ==
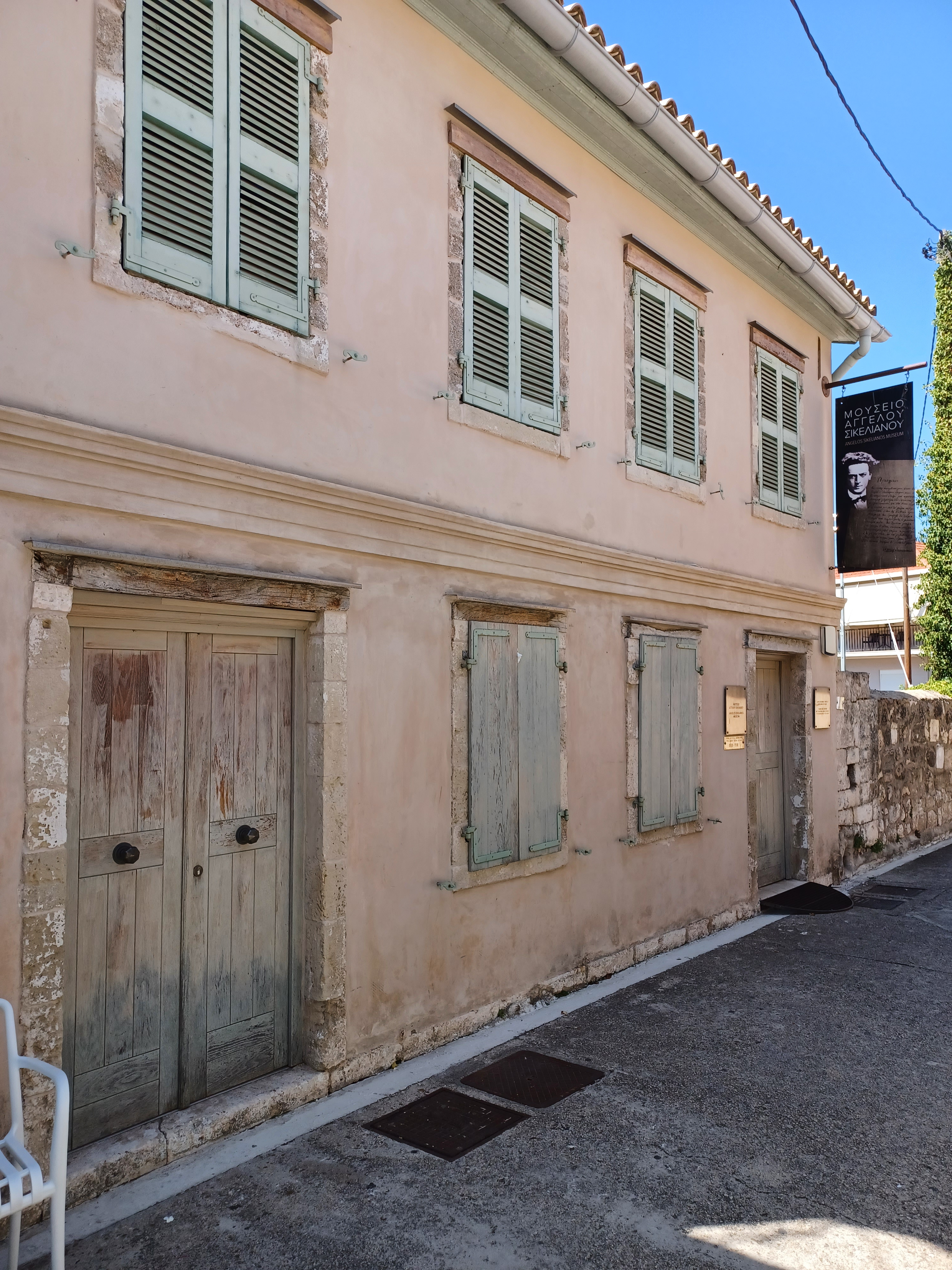
The Sikelianos family home in the old town of Lefkada, housing the Angelos Sikelianos Museum

During the Axis occupation of Greece (1941–44), he became a source of inspiration to the Greek people, especially through his speech and poem that he recited at the funeral of the poet Kostis Palamas. It was he who composed the letter which was spearheaded by Archbishop Damaskinos to save the lives of Greek Jews by appealing directly to the Germans. The letter was signed by many prominent Greek citizens in defense of the Jews who were being persecuted. There is no similar document of protest against Nazi occupiers during World War II that has come to light in any other European country.

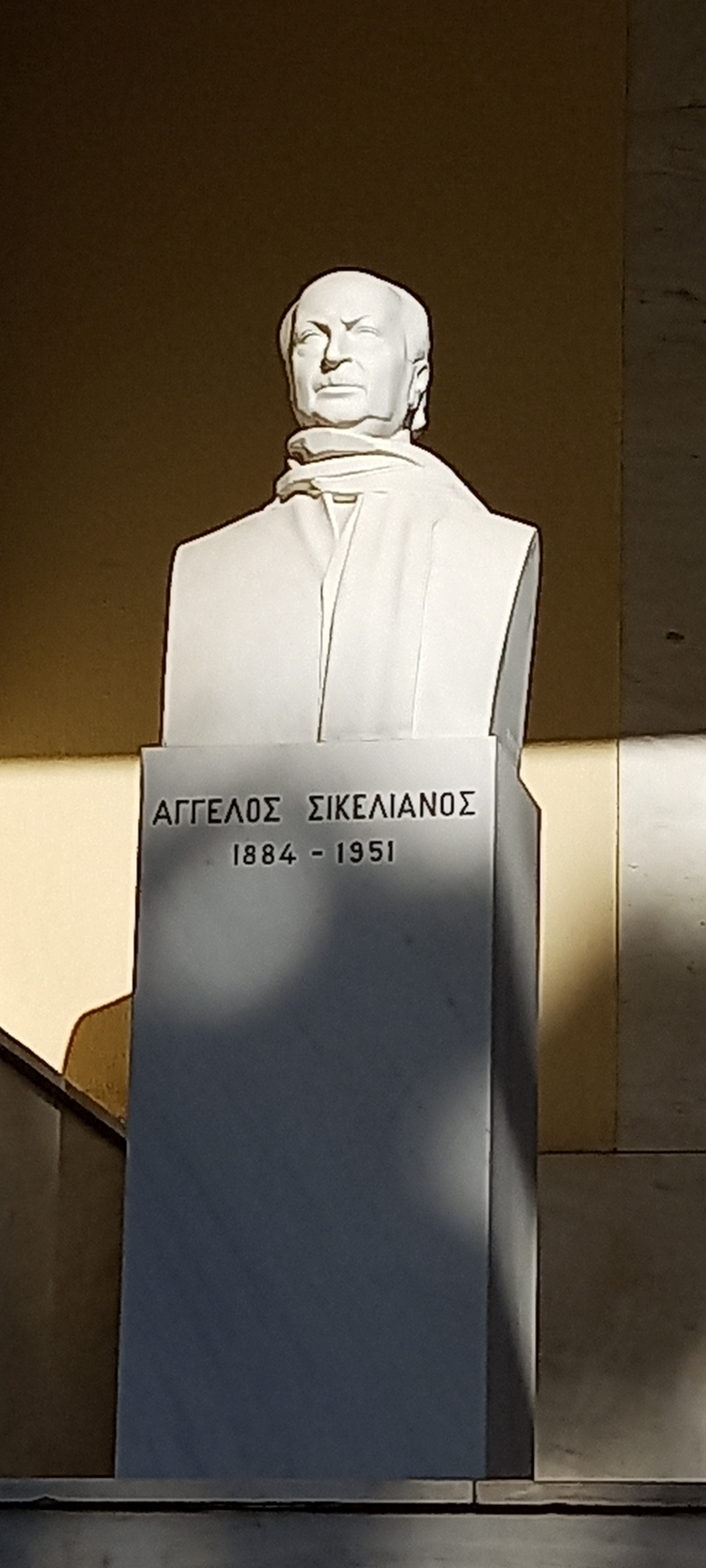
Angelos Sikelianos marble bust at Athens municipal library, Greece

In 1945 he was a founding member of the Greek-Soviet friendship union (among Nikos Kazantzakis, Nicolas Kitsikis, Yanis Kordatos, Aimilios Veakis, Ilias Iliou, Patroklos Karantinos, Athanase Apartis, George Zongolopoulos and others).

Sikelianos suffered from a chronic disease for several years. He died accidentally on 19 June 1951 in Athens from inadvertently drinking Lysol after having requested Nujol (a medicine). He was buried in the First Cemetery of Athens. He is the great-grandfather of the poet Eleni Sikelianos.

== Work ==
Sikelianos published his poetic work in three volumes in 1946 and 1947. The collection's title was "Lyric Life". He left, however, several poems unpublished. In 1965 G.P. Savvides, a leading Greek philologist, started to publish the entire poetic work of Sikelianos, which finally comprised five volumes.

=== Translations ===
- Selected Poems, tr. E. Keeley, P. Sherrard (1979; repr. 1980) ISBN 960-7120-12-4
