= Carol Handley =

British educator (1929–2024)

- Born: Carol Margaret Taylor; 17 October 1929; London, England
- Died: 21 June 2024 (aged 94)
- Spouse: Eric Handley (m. 1952; died 2013)
- Parent(s): Claud Hilary and Margaret Eleanor (Peebles) Taylor

Academic background
- Education: University College, London

Academic work
- Discipline: Classics
- Institutions: Camden School for Girls; Classical Association; Wolfson College, Cambridge; Institute of Continuing Education

Carol Margaret Handley (née Taylor; 17 October 1929 – 21 June 2024) was a British educator who was headmistress of Camden School for Girls (1971–1985) and president of the Classical Association (1996–1997). Handley was later a classics tutor at Wolfson College, Cambridge. Handley is known for her longstanding advocacy for Classics education in schools and universities, as well as for her work on teaching and examination materials for the Joint Association of Classical Teachers and for the University of Cambridge.

== Career ==
After completing her Classics BA at UCL in 1951, Handley began her teaching career at Queen's Gate School, London in 1952. She moved to Camden School for Girls in 1956 as a Classics teacher becoming the Senior Classics mistress. In 1965 Handley became Deputy Head and then Headmistress in 1971. She retired from Camden School for Girls in 1985.

Throughout this time Handley was involved with the Joint Association of Classical Teachers, and was co-founder with David Raeburn and John Sharwood Smith of the JACT Greek summer school in 1968. When the original venue, Dean Close School, Cheltenham, became unavailable in 1986, she was instrumental in finding Bryanston School for the new location of the Greek summer school, working closely with James Morwood, who had succeeded David Raeburn as Director.

From 1991 to 2005, Handley was the director of the Reading Greek courses at the Institute of Continuing Education, Cambridge. During this time Handley became president of the Classical Association in 1996, and her presidential address in 1997 was published as Things That Matter. Handley was only the fifth woman president since the Classical Association was founded in 1903. She was a Classics tutor at Wolfson College, Cambridge.

== Personal life and death ==
Handley married Eric Handley on 31 July 1952. He was the leading scholar in the rediscovery of the playwright Menander, writing an important commentary on the Dyskolos. He was Professor of Greek at UCL and then was Regius Professor of Greek at Trinity College, Cambridge, until his death in 2013. He was also a fellow of the British Academy.

Carol Handley died on 21 June 2024, at the age of 94.

== Select publications ==
- A Greek Anthology (Carol Handley, James Morwood and John Taylor, Cambridge University Press, 2002) ISBN 0-52-100026-2
- with Pat Easterling (eds.) Greek Scripts: An Illustrated Introduction (Society for the Promotion of Hellenic Studies 2001)
- Things That Matter (Classical Association 1997)
- with Jeannie Cohen, James Morwood, James Neville An Independent Study Guide to Reading Greek (Cambridge University Press, various editions)
- The Future of Greek in Schools, Didaskalos (1967) v2 n2 p. 12–22
