= Council of University Classical Departments =

The Council of University Classical Departments (CUCD), founded in 1969, is the association of university departments in the United Kingdom in which Classics (the study of Greek and Roman antiquity) and related subjects are taught and researched. As such, it is one of the principal voices of Classics in the UK (alongside others such as the Classical Association, the Joint Association of Classical Teachers, and Friends of Classics), and the only one with a distinctive focus on Higher Education.

The Council is composed of a Representative of each member institution (there are currently 29), and normally meets once a year in November in London. The Standing Committee, with a membership of around 18, normally meets three times a year in London. The Council has published an annual Bulletin since 1972.

In recent years CUCD has been increasingly active in defending and advancing the position of Classics in the UK. On 17 March 2005 the Council, together with Friends of Classics, hosted a reception for parliamentarians and others in the Palace of Westminster, to promote the cause of classical subjects. CUCD maintains strong links with other Arts, Humanities, and Law subject associations, as well as with the All-Party Parliamentary Group for Classics. The former chair, Robin Osborne, has more than once spoken for the concerns of Humanities subjects in general.

== Present and past chairs of CUCD ==
(As recorded in the Bulletin; earliest years not recorded there.)

- 2018–present Prof. Helen Lovatt
- 2012-18 Prof. Greg Woolf
- 2006–12 Prof. Robin Osborne
- 2003–6 Prof. Graham Shipley
- 2001–3 Prof. Gillian Clark
- 1999–2001 Prof. Robert W. Sharples
- 1997–9 Prof. Christopher J. Rowe
- 1993–7 Prof. John S. Richardson
- 1991–3 Prof. P. E. Easterling
- 1988–91 Prof. T. P. Wiseman
- 1985–8 Prof. Donald C. Earl
- 1982–5 Prof. Trevor J. Saunders
- 1979–82 Prof. Fred Robertson
- 1976–9 Prof. Eric W. Handley
- 1973–6 Prof. George B. Kerferd
- 1972 Prof. H. C. Baldry
