= T. B. L. Webster =

English classical philologist and archaeologist

Professor Thomas B. L. Webster FRA FSA
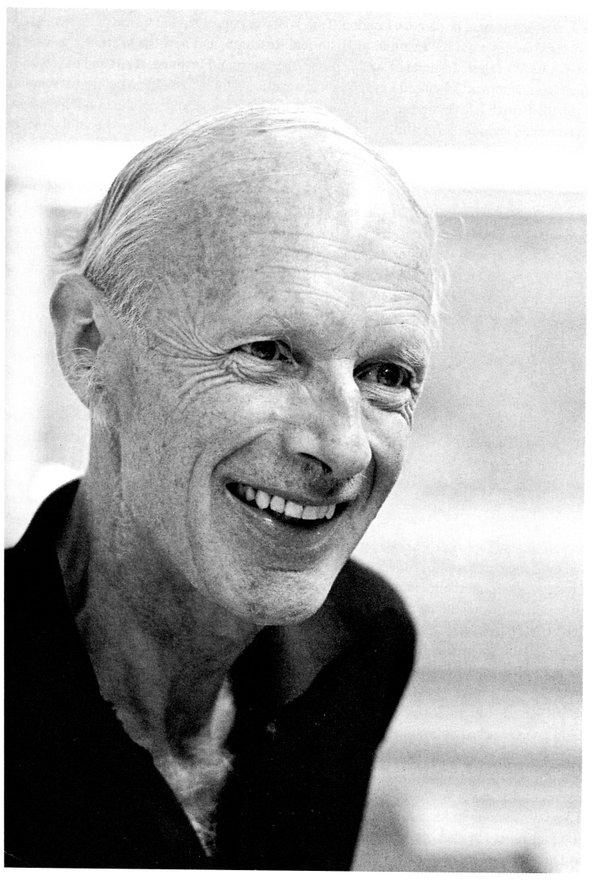
- T. B. L. Webster
- Born: 3 July 1905
- Died: 31 May 1974 (aged 68)

Academic background
- Education: Charterhouse; University of Oxford

Academic work
- Discipline: Archaeology; Classics
- Institutions: University of Manchester; University College, London; Stanford University

Thomas Bertram Lonsdale Webster FRA FSA (3 July 1905 – 31 May 1974) was a British classicist and archaeologist, known for his studies of Greek comedy.

== Background ==
He was the son of Sir Thomas Lonsdale Webster. During World War I he attended Charterhouse. As a student at Oxford University, he first studied Greek vases that John Beazley had brought in, but soon switched to Menander and developed a lifelong interest in Greek comedy that resulted in "reconstructions of the plots of lost plays and ... collections of evidence from widely disparate sources bearing on the history of the Greek theater".

== Career ==
He followed William Moir Calder (1880–1960) as Hulme Professor of Greek at Manchester University, a position he held 1931–48, when he was followed by H. D. Westlake (1906–1992). He then was Professor of Greek at University College London 1948–1968 and in 1953 established the Institute of Classical Studies. During World War II he served as an officer in the military intelligence. After his wife, the Classicist A. M. Dale, died in 1967, he moved to Stanford University as professor of classics and as an emeritus.

== Awards and honours ==
- President of the Joint Association of Classical Teachers
- President of the Hellenic Society and the Classical Association
- Membership of the Manchester Literary and Philosophical Society in1936.
- President Manchester Literary and Philosophical Society 1946–48
- Honorary Doctor of Letters at University of Manchester 1966 (also at Trinity College, Dublin)
- Fellowships of the Royal Academy and the Society of Antiquaries of London
- In honour of his work, a street in the Acropolis district of Athens has been renamed to Webster Street (transliterated Gouemster on some signs and maps).

== Publications ==
- A.S. Owen; T.B.L. Webster (1930). Excerpta ex antiquis scriptoribus quae ad Forum Romanum spectant / comparaverunt. Clarendon Press.
- T.B.L. Webster (1936). An introduction to Sophocles. Clarendon Press.
- —— (1939). Greek art and literature 530-400 B.C. Clarendon Press.
- —— (1950). Greek terracottas. Penguin Books.
- —— (1950). Studies in Menander. Manchester University Press.
- —— (1953). Studies in later greek comedy. Manchester University Press.
- —— (1956). Greek theatre production. Methuen Publishing.
- —— (1956). Art and literature in fourth century Athens. Athlone Press.
- —— (1958). From Mycenae to Homer. A study in early Greek literature and art. Methuen Publishing.
- —— (1959). Greek art and literature 700–530 BC. The beginnings of modern civilization. Methuen Publishing.
- —— (1959). The birth of modern comedy of manners. Griffin Press, Adelaide.
- —— (1960). Monuments illustrating old and middle comedy. Bull.Suppl., Institute of Classical Studies.
- —— (1961). Monuments illustrating new comedy. Bull.Suppl., Institute of Classical Studies.
- —— (1962). Monuments illustrating tragedy and satyr play. Bull.Suppl., Institute of Classical Studies.
- —— (1964). Hellenistic poetry and art. Methuen Publishing.
- —— (1966). The art of Greece. The age of hellenism. Crown Publishing.
- —— (1967). The tragedies of Euripides. Methuen Publishing.
- —— (1969). Everyday life in classical Athens. Illustrated by Eva Wilson. B.T. Batsford.
- —— (1970). The Greek chorus. Methuen Publishing.
- —— (1970). Sophocles: Philoctetes. Cambridge University Press.
- Arthur Dale Trendall; —— (1971). Illustrations of Greek drama. Phaidon Press.
- —— (1972). Potter and patron in classical Athens. Methuen Publishing.
- —— (1973). Athenian culture and society. University of California Press, Berkeley.

Academic offices
Preceded by Marriott T. Smiley	Professor of Greek, University College London; 1948–1968	Succeeded by E. W. Handley
Professional and academic associations
Preceded by Michael Polanyi	President of the Manchester Literary and Philosophical Society; 1946–48	Succeeded by Eric John Francis James
