= Electra (Euripides play) =

Ancient Greek tragedy by Euripides

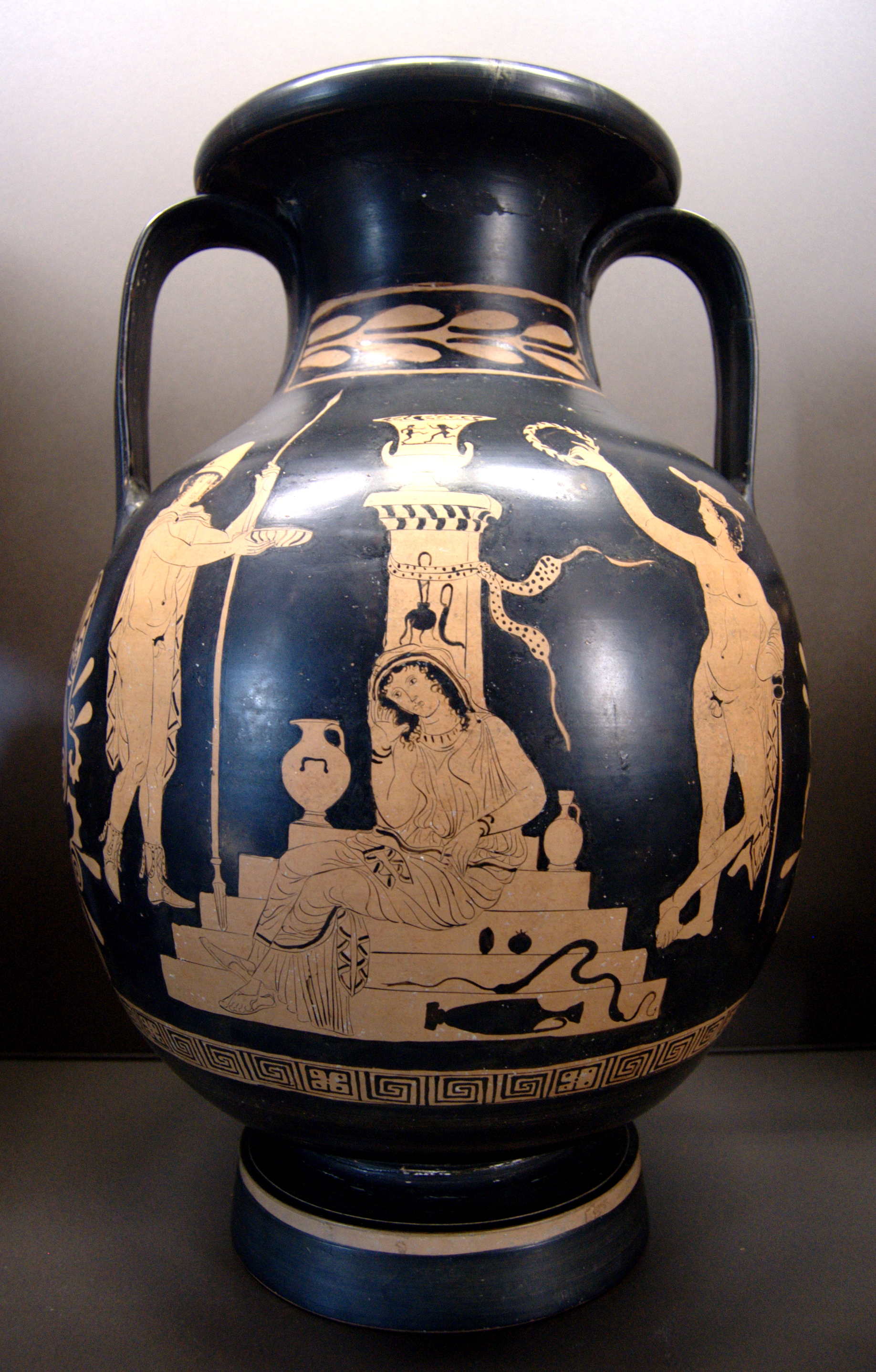
- Orestes, Electra and Hermes at Agamemnon's tomb. Side A of a Lucanian red-figure pelike, c. 380–370 BC.
- Original language: Ancient Greek
- Written by: Euripides
- Chorus: Argive women
- Characters: Farmer, husband of Electra; Electra; Orestes; Old servant Messenger; Clytemnestra; Castor
- Mute: Pylades; Pollux; Servants
- Genre: Tragedy
- Setting: Argos, at the house of Electra's husband

Premiere
- Place: City Dionysia

Euripides' Electra (Ancient Greek: Ἠλέκτρα, Ēlektra) is a tragedy probably written in the mid 410s BC, likely before 413 BC. A version of the myth of the house of Atreus, Euripides' play reworks important aspects of the story found in Aeschylus' Oresteia trilogy (especially the second play, Libation Bearers) and also in Sophocles' Electra, although the relative dating of Euripides' and Sophocles' plays remain uncertain. In his tragedy, Euripides introduces startling and disturbing elements that ask his audience (and readers) to question the nature of tragic 'heroism,' assumptions of appropriate gender behavior, and the morality of both human characters and the gods.

== Background ==
Years before the start of the play, at the outset of the Trojan War, the Greek general Agamemnon, king of Mycenae, sacrifices his daughter Iphigeneia in order to appease the goddess Artemis. While his sacrifice allows the Greek army to sail for Troy, it leads to deep resentment from his wife, Clytemnestra, who also has born Agamemnon's other children, Orestes and Electra. When Agamemnon returns victorious from the Trojan War ten years later, Clytemnestra (in this version and some others, she is helped by her lover Aegisthus) murders him in the bath. Orestes goes into exile, while Electra remains in the palace under the thumb of her mother and Aegisthus, the new rulers in Argos.

== Characters ==
=== Major characters ===
- Peasant Farmer - Unnamed husband of Electra, who Aegisthus had married to him so that she would not give birth to noble heirs that would attempt to avenge Agamemnon's murder.
- Electra - Daughter of Agamemnon and Clytemnestra, and sister of Orestes, who assists her brother in the plot to murder Clytemnestra and Aegisthus upon his return.
- Orestes - Son of Agamemnon and Clytemnestra, who was taken away to Phocis to protect him before returning with his friend Pylades to avenge his father's murder.
- Old servant - An old servant of Agamemnon, who previously took Orestes away to prevent him from being murdered by Aegisthus, later helping recognize Orestes upon his return.
- Messenger - A servant of Orestes who serves to impart how Aegisthus was slain by Orestes off-stage.
- Clytemnestra - Agamemnon's widow and Orestes and Electra's mother, who murdered her husband with the help of Aegisthus before marrying him.
- Castor - Clytemnestra's brother and son of Zeus, who was deified - he and his brother Pollux appear before Orestes and Electra at the end of the play, telling them what they must do to cleanse their own sin of matricide.

=== Minor characters ===
- Pylades - Non-speaking role; Orestes's friend, and son of King Strophius of Phocis. He helps Orestes murder Aegisthus, and is later given Electra as his wife.
- Pollux - Non-speaking role; Castor's brother, who appears with Castor at the end of the play to counsel Orestes and Electra.
- Aegisthus - Unseen character; Clytemnestra's lover, now king, who helped her murder Agamemnon and is murdered by Orestes off-stage.
- Strophius - Unseen character; King of Phocis, father of Pylades, who sheltered Orestes as he grew up.

== Plot ==
The play opens with a prologue delivered by a poor farmer, who informs us that he is the erstwhile husband of Electra. When Electra reached marriageable age, Aegisthus feared that a noble husband would father children who might revenge Agamemnon's murder. So he and Clytemnestra marry off Electra to this poor Mycenaean, who treats her kindly, honors her royal lineage, and respects her virginity. While lamenting her father's murder and her loss of status, Electra helps her husband with the household chores, going off to fetch water from the spring.

After Agamemnon's murder, Orestes is spirited away to Phocis, where he befriends the king's son, Pylades. Now grown, Orestes returns to Argos with Pylades, and he seeks out news of his sister Electra and considers how to revenge their father Agamemnon's murder. They come to a poor hillside cottage that turns out to be Electra and the farmer's home. Claiming to bring a message from her brother, Orestes keeps his identity hidden, even after he determines Electra's loyalty and her commitment to avenge Agamemnon's murder. Sent for by Electra, the aged servant of the family arrives at her homestead, and he "outs" Orestes when he recognizes him by the scar on his brow.

Joyfully reunited, brother and sister plot how they will murder both Aegisthus and Clytemnestra. The old servant explains that Aegisthus is currently in country where his horses pasture, preparing a sacrifice and feast. Before Orestes and Pylades go to confront Aegisthus, Electra sends the old servant to tell Clytemnestra that she had a son ten days ago, knowing this will bring Clytemnestra to her house. A messenger arrives and describes Orestes' murder of Aegisthus during the sacrifice. Orestes and Pylades return with the corpse, and Electra delivers a vindictive speech over the body. When Orestes sees Clytemnestra approaching in a wagon, he wavers in his commitment to murder her. Electra shames her brother, and he hides in the cottage awaiting the inevitable. Mother and daughter alternate speeches of accusation, until Clytemnestra is invited into the cottage to help Electra with the birth ritual for her (fictional) newborn. Helped by Electra, Orestes kills their mother with a sword.

The two leave the house, filled with grief and guilt. As they lament, Clytemnestra's deified brothers, Castor and Pollux, appear. They tell Electra and Orestes that their mother received just punishment but their matricide was still a shameful act, and they instruct the siblings on what they must do to atone and purge their souls.

== Aeschylean parody and Homeric allusion ==
The enduring popularity of Aeschylus' Oresteia trilogy (produced in 458 BC) is evident in Euripides' construction of the recognition scene between Orestes and Electra, which mocks Aeschylus' play. In The Libation Bearers (whose plot is roughly equivalent to the events in Electra), Electra recognizes her brother by a series of tokens: a lock of his hair, a footprint he leaves at Agamemnon's grave, and an article of clothing she had made for him years earlier. Euripides' own recognition scene clearly ridicules Aeschylus' account. In Euripides' play (510ff.), Electra laughs at the idea of using such tokens to recognize her brother because: there is no reason their hair should match; Orestes' footprint would in no way resemble her smaller footprint; and it would be illogical for a grown Orestes to still have a piece of clothing made for him when he was a small child.

Orestes is instead recognized from a scar he received on the forehead while chasing a doe in the house as a child (571–74). This is a mock-heroic allusion to a scene from Homer's Odyssey. In Odyssey 19.428-54, the nurse Eurycleia recognizes a newly returned Odysseus from a scar on his thigh that he received as a child while on his first boar hunt. In the Odyssey, Orestes' return to Argos and taking revenge for his father's death is held up several times as a model for Telemachus' behavior (see Telemachy). Euripides in turn uses his recognition scene to allude to the one in Odyssey 19. Instead of an epic heroic boar hunt, Euripides instead invents a semi-comic incident involving a fawn.

== Translations ==
- Robert Potter, 1783 – verse: full text
- Edward P. Coleridge, 1891 – prose: full text
- Aurthur S. Way, 1896 – verse: full text
- Gilbert Murray, 1911 – verse: full text
- Moses Hadas and John McLean, 1936 - prose
- D. W. Lucas, 1951 – prose
- Emily Townsend Vermeule, 1958 – verse
- M. J. Cropp, 1988 – verse
- J. Lembke & K.J. Reckford, 1994
- James Morwood, 1997 – prose
- K. McLeish, 1997
- J. Davie, 1998
- J. Morwood, 1998
- M. MacDonald and J. M. Walton, 2004 – verse
- G. Theodoridis, 2006 – prose: full text
- Ian C. Johnston, 2009 – verse: full text
- Brian Vinero, 2012: verse
- Emily Wilson, 2016 - verse

== Adaptations ==
- Electra, 1962 film

== Sources ==
- Arnott, W. G. 1993. "Double the Vision: A Reading of Euripides' Electra (1981)" In Greek Tragedy. Greece and Rome Studies, Volume II. Edited by Ian McAuslan and Peter Walcot. New York: Oxford University Press
- Gallagher, Robert L. 2003. "Making the Stronger Argument the Weaker: Euripides, Electra 518-41." Classical Quarterly 53.2: 401–415
- Garner, R. 1990. From Homer to Tragedy: The Art of Allusion in Greek Poetry. London: Routledge.
- Garvie, Alexander F. 2012. "Three Different Electras in Three Different Plots." Lexis 30:283–293.
- Gellie, G. H. 1981. "Tragedy and Euripides' Electra." Bulletin of the Institute of Classical Studies 28:1–12.
- Goff, Barbara. 1999–2000. "Try to Make it Real Compared to What? Euripides' Electra and the Play of Genres." Illinois Classical Studies 24–25:93–105.
- Hammond, N. G. L. 1985. "Spectacle and Parody in Euripides' Electra." Greek, Roman and Byzantine Studies 25:373–387.
- Morwood, J. H. W. 1981. "The Pattern of the Euripides Electra." American Journal of Philology 102:362–370.
- Mossman, Judith. 2001. "Women's Speech in Greek Tragedy: The Case of Electra and Clytemnestra in Euripides' Electra." Classical Quarterly n 51:374–384.
- Raeburn, David. 2000. "The Significance of Stage Properties in Euripides' Electra." Greece & Rome 47:149–168.
- Solmsen, F. 1967. Electra and Orestes: Three Recognitions in Greek Tragedy. Amsterdam: Noord-Hollandsche Uitgevers Mij.
- Tarkow, T. 1981. "The Scar of Orestes: Observations on a Euripidean Innovation." Rheinisches Museum 124: 143–53.
- Tsitsiridis, Stavros 2023. ‘Euripides’ Electra: Exploring Generic Experimentation’, Quaderni Urbinati di Cultura Classica 133: 95–125.
- Wohl, Victoria. 2015. "How to Recognise a Hero in Euripides' Electra." Bulletin of the Institute of Classical Studies 58:61–76.
