= Society for the Promotion of Hellenic Studies =

British scholarly society

The Society for the Promotion of Hellenic Studies
- Founded: 1879
- Type: Charity (No. 245623)
- Location: Institute of Classical Studies
- Key people: Professor Paul Cartledge (President)
- Website: www.hellenicsociety.org.uk

The Society for the Promotion of Hellenic Studies, known as the Hellenic Society, was founded in 1879 to advance the study of Greek language, literature, history, art and archaeology in the Ancient, Byzantine and Modern periods. The first President was J. B. Lightfoot, the biblical scholar and Bishop of Durham. Ioannis Gennadius helped found it.

The Society has done this ever since by various means, chief among them being the annual publication of the Journal of Hellenic Studies and, since the 1950s, its supplement, Archaeological Reports, which are both supplied free of charge to members and subscribers of the Society. Occasional monographs have also appeared in the series Supplementary Papers; this series has now been replaced by the Society's Occasional Publications.

== Work ==
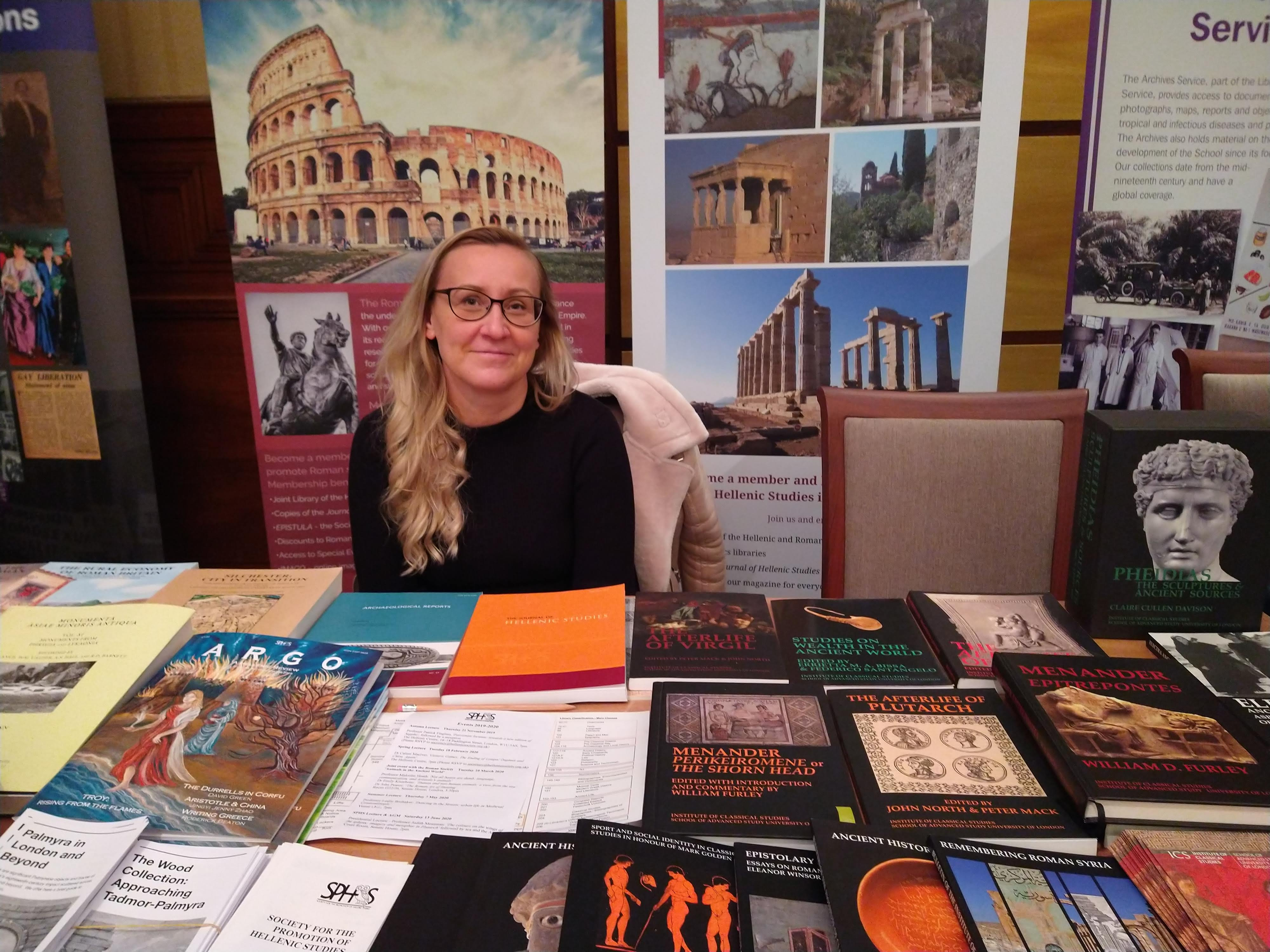
The Hellenic Society at the Senate House History Day, 2019.

The Society is based, together with the Society for the Promotion of Roman Studies, in the premises of the Institute of Classical Studies of the University of London at the Senate House (University of London).

The Society maintains the Joint Library, in conjunction with the Roman Society, which is integrated into a Combined Library with that of the Institute of Classical Studies.

The Society arranges an annual lecture series in London, conferences, receptions and other meetings, and helps to arrange other lectures all around the UK in collaboration with the local branches of the Classical Association. The Society holds a list of lecturers on topics in Hellenic Studies, which is supplied to Classical Association branches, classical teacher groups, and other organisations to help them plan their own lecture programmes.

The Society aims to help those engaged in Hellenic Studies at all levels, and to this end it makes grants of various kinds to schools, universities and other institutions, undergraduates, graduate students and young researchers.

== Officers ==
These were the officers of the Hellenic Society in 2023-2024:

President: Professor Paul Cartledge
Vice-Presidents: Professor P.E. Easterling, FBA; Professor Robert Fowler, FBA; Mr Brian Gilmore; Mr. George Lemos; Dr Pantelis Michelakis; Professor Judith Mossman; Dr Margaret Mountford; Professor R. G. Osborne, FBA; Professor C. J. Rowe; Professor Malcolm Schofield, FBA; Professor B. A. Sparkes; Dr David Thomas
Hon. Treasurer: Mr Peter Lennon
Hon. Secretary: Leslie Fitton
Executive Secretary: Dr Fiona Haarer
Membership Officer: Dr Jan Haywood

== Presidents ==
List of presidents since 1879:

- The Right Revd. J. B. Lightfoot (1879-1890)
- Professor Sir Richard Jebb (1890-1905)
- Professor Percy Gardner (1905-1910)
- Sir Arthur Evans (1910-1914)
- Walter Leaf (1914-1919)
- Sir Frederic Kenyon (1919-1924)
- Arthur Hamilton Smith (1924-1929)
- George Macmillan (Acting) (1928-1929)
- Professor Ernest Gardner (1929-1932)
- Professor R. M. Dawkins (1932-1935)
- Sir John Myres (1935-1938)
- Sir Richard Livingstone (1938-1941)
- Sir Arthur Pickard-Cambridge (1941-1945)
- Professor Gilbert Murray (1945-1948)
- Professor E. R. Dodds (1948-1951)
- Professor T. B. L. Webster (1951-1954)
- Professor Dorothy Tarrant (1954-1956)
- Professor A. W. Gomme (1956-1959)
- Professor R. P. Winnington-Ingram (1959-1962)
- Professor A. Andrewes (1962-1965)
- Professor N. G. L. Hammond (1965-1968)
- Professor E. G. Turner (1968-1971)
- Sir Kenneth Dover (1971-1974)
- Professor R. Browning 1974-1977)
- Professor G. S. Kirk (1977-1980)
- Professor P. E. Corbett (1980-1983)
- Professor G. B. Kerferd (1983-1986)
- Sir David Hunt (1986-1990)
- Professor J. P. Barron (1990-1993)
- Professor E. W. Handley (1993-1996)
- Professor P. E. Easterling (1996-1999)
- Professor C. J. Rowe (1999-2002)
- Professor R. G. Osborne (2002-2006)
- Professor C. B. R. Pelling (2006-2008)
- Professor Malcolm Schofield (2008-2011)
- Professor Chris Carey (2011-2014)
- Professor Robert Fowler (2014-2017)
- Professor Judith Mossman (2017-2020)
- Professor Paul Cartledge (2020- )
