= Malcolm Schofield =

British classical scholar (born 1942)

Malcolm Schofield, FBA (born 19 April 1942) is a British classicist and academic, specialising in ancient philosophy.

== Career ==
Having taught at Cornell University and the University of Oxford, he joined the University of Cambridge in 1972 as a lecturer in classics and a Fellow of St John's College, Cambridge. He was promoted to Reader in Ancient Philosophy in 1989, and made Professor of Ancient Philosophy 1998. Since retiring in 2009, he has been an emeritus professor at Cambridge.

In 2002, Schofield was reported to be a candidate to become the Vice-Chancellor of Cambridge University, the principal academic and administrative officer of Cambridge University.

In 1997, Schofield was elected a Fellow of the British Academy (FBA), the United Kingdom's national academy for the humanities and social sciences.

From 1989 to 2003, Schofield was Honorary Secretary of the Classical Association, and from 2006 to 2007 he served as its president. From 2008 to 2011, Schofield served as the president of the Society for the Promotion of Hellenic Studies. From 2010 to 2016 served as Chair of Council of the British School at Athens.

== Selected works ==
- Schofield, Malcom (1980). An Essay on Anaxagoras. Cambridge: Cambridge University Press. ISBN 978-0-521-04261-1
- Burnyeat, Miles; Barnes, Jonathon; Schofield, Malcolm, eds. (1980) Doubt & Dogmatism: Studies in Hellenistic Epistemology. Oxford: The Clarendon Press. ISBN 978-0-19-824601-5
- Kirk, G. S.; Raven, J. E.; Schofield, M. (1983). The presocratic philosophers: a critical history with a selection of texts (2nd ed.). Cambridge: Cambridge University Press. ISBN 978-0521254441.
- Schofield, Malcolm (1998). Saving the city: philosopher-kings and other classical paradigms. London: Routledge. ISBN 978-0415184670.
- Schofield, Malcolm (1999).The Stoic Idea of the City. New Edition. Chicago: University of Chicago Press. ISBN 978-0-226-74006-5
- Algra, Kemp; Barnes, Jonathon; Mansfeld, Jaap; Schofield, Malcolm, eds. (1999). The Cambridge History of Hellenistic Philosophy. Cambridge, Cambridge University Press. ISBN 978-1-139-05361-7
- Rowe, Christopher; Schofield, Malcolm; Harrison, Simon; Lane, Melissa, eds. (2000). The Cambridge history of Greek and Roman political thought. Cambridge: Cambridge University Press. ISBN 978-0521481366.
- Schofield, Malcolm (2006). Plato: political philosophy. Oxford: Oxford University Press. ISBN 978-0199249619.
- Schofield, Malcolm (2013). Aristotle, Plato and Pythagoreanism in the first century BC: new directions for philosophy. Cambridge: Cambridge University Press. ISBN 978-1139625388.
- Schofield, Malcom (2021). Cicero: political philosophy. Oxford: Oxford University Press. ISBN 978-0-19-968492-2
- Schofield, Malcolm (2023). How Plato Writes: Perspectives and Problems. Cambridge: Cambridge University Press. ISBN 9781108483087.
