= A. M. Dale =

British classicist and academic (1901–1967)

A. M. Dale FBA
- Born: Amy Marjorie Dale; 15 January 1901; West Bridgford, Nottinghamshire
- Died: 4 February 1967 (aged 66)
- Spouse: T. B. L. Webster (m. 1944)

Academic background
- Education: Somerville College, Oxford; University of Vienna; University of Lund
- Influences: Hilda Lorimer; Gilbert Murray

Academic work
- Discipline: Classics
- Sub-discipline: Ancient Greek drama, Ancient Greek metre
- Institutions: Westfield College, London; Lady Margaret Hall, Oxford; Birkbeck College, London
- Doctoral students: L. P. E. Parker
- Espionage activity
- Allegiance: United Kingdom
- Agency: Government Code and Cipher School
- Service years: 1939–1945

Amy Marjorie Dale, FBA (15 January 1901 – 4 February 1967), published as A. M. Dale, was a British classicist and academic. Born in Nottinghamshire and educated in Sheffield, she read Classics at Somerville College, Oxford, on a scholarship. There, having come to the attention of Gilbert Murray for her self-taught abilities in composing ancient Greek verse, she achieved a double first, becoming the fourth woman to do so since 1890. Following a year's study under Ludwig Radermacher, an expert in Greek comedy, at University of Vienna, she took an academic post at Westfield College in the University of London in 1927, before returning to Oxford as a fellow and tutor of Lady Margaret Hall in 1929.

On the recommendation of Lynda Grier, the principal of Lady Margaret Hall, Dale was recruited by Alastair Denniston, the operational head of the Government Code and Cypher School, to work as a codebreaker upon the outbreak of the Second World War. Although officially employed by the Foreign Office, she worked at Bletchley Park, decoding Japanese naval telegrams. At Bletchley she met T. B. L. Webster, Professor of Greek at the University of Manchester; the two married in 1944. After the end of the war, she moved to Manchester with Webster, and moved again with him to London in 1948, where she became a lecturer at Birkbeck College. In 1959, she became Birkbeck's professor of Greek and its first female professor of classics. Her health, which had been poor throughout her life, forced her retirement in 1963, and she died in 1967.

Dale's academic work focused on Greek tragedy, especially Euripides, and the metre of ancient Greek lyric verse. An obituary by Eric Gardner Turner called her "the foremost living authority on Ancient Greek metre".

== Early life and education ==
Amy Marjorie (known as "Madge") Dale was born in West Bridgford, Nottinghamshire, on 15 January 1901. Her father, Edward Dale, was a civil engineer. She was educated at Sheffield Central Secondary School, from which she won a scholarship to read Classics at Somerville College, Oxford. She was taught at Somerville by Hilda Lorimer; after Dale revealed to Lorimer that she had taught herself the practice of translating poetry into Ancient Greek – known as "verse composition", and then only generally taught in elite schools and to male undergraduates – Lorimer tasked her with translating a passage of Shakespeare into Greek. Lorimer in turn showed Dale's translation to Gilbert Murray, a scholar of ancient Greek language and religion, who agreed to teach Dale, without pay, on Sundays. Dale later credited him as "the scholar to whom ... I owe more than I can ever find words to express".

Dale achieved first-class honours in both Mods (in 1921) and Greats (in 1923) examinations, making her the fourth women to achieve a "double first" since women had first been permitted to sit the examinations in 1890. She suffered from severe asthma throughout her life, and wrote her final papers in Somerville's sick bay. On the strength of her results, she was awarded the Gilchrist Studentship to study for a year at the University of Vienna, where she was taught by Ludwig Radermacher, an expert in Greek comedy.

== Early academic career and wartime service ==
Dale's first academic post was at Westfield College in the University of London, which she took in 1927; during her time there, she published a school textbook on ancient history. (Note: Winnington-Ingram 1967, p. 423. The book is Dale 1928.) In 1929, she returned to Oxford as a fellow and tutor of Lady Margaret Hall. She took a year's sabbatical in the 1930s to study at the University of Lund under Albert Wifstrand.

Dale was one of the potential staff identified by Alastair Denniston, the operational head of the Government Code and Cypher School, in a list sent to the Foreign Office in 1938 of potential recruits for codebreaking in the event of war. She was recommended to Denniston by Lynda Grier, the principal of Lady Margaret Hall, whom Denniston used to provide names of potential female recruits from Oxford University. Dale was one of only two women, alongside Fiona Ede, out of around fifty people listed, and Denniston continued to refer to the list as comprising "men of the professor type". She was duly hired when the Second World War broke out in September 1939: she was the only woman among the thirty-one senior-grade codebreakers recruited by Denniston. Officially, she was employed by the Foreign Office.

In February 1941, Dale was listed as one of the ten members of the GC&CS's cryptographic section, working on naval intelligence. She worked at Bletchley Park, where her tasks included decoding Japanese telegrams. At Bletchley she met T. B. L. Webster, Professor of Greek at the University of Manchester, also working in codebreaking: the two married in 1944. During her spare time in her war service, she worked on translating Eduard Fraenkel's German edition of Aeschylus's Agamemnon into English.

== Post-war career ==
After the war, Dale moved with Webster to Manchester. When Webster was appointed Professor of Greek at University College London in 1948, she took a part-time lectureship at the city's Birkbeck College, which became a full-time readership in 1952. In 1957, she was elected a Fellow of the British Academy. In 1959, she was appointed professor of Greek at Birkbeck, making her the college's first female professor of classics. She opened her inaugural lecture, on "Words, Music and Dance", with a passage from Gilbert and Sullivan. She visited the Institute for Advanced Study in Princeton, New Jersey, with Webster in 1959, and made a tour in the same year of Australia and New Zealand. In 1962 she was made an Honorary Fellow of Somerville College, Oxford. Her doctoral students in London included L. P. E. Parker.

Dale retired due to ill-health in 1963, and died on 4 February 1967, at the age of 66. A work of colometry (division into metrical units) of Greek tragic lyrics, compiled from Dale's notebooks and published writings, was published posthumously in three volumes in 1971, 1981 and 1982.

The focus of Dale's research was on Greek tragedy, especially on Euripides, and the metre of ancient Greek lyric verse, particularly that of tragic drama. An obituary by Eric Gardner Turner called her "the foremost living authority on Ancient Greek metre".

== Selected publications ==
- Dale, A. M. (1928). A Junior Ancient History. London: Methuen.
- — (1948). The Lyric Metres of Greek Drama. (Second Edition 1968). Cambridge University Press.
- Euripides (1954). Dale, A. M. (ed.). Alcestis. With introduction and commentary. Oxford University Press.
- Dale, A. M. (1950). "The Metrical Units of Greek Lyric Verse: 1". The Classical Quarterly. 44 (3/4): 138–148. JSTOR 637346.
- Words, Music, and Dance. Inaugural Lecture at Birkbeck College. London 1960.
- Euripides, Helen. Edited with introduction and commentary. Oxford 1967.
- Collected Papers. Edited by T. B. L. Webster and E. G. Turner. Cambridge 1969, (Available online) – Published posthumously, including some previously unpublished work.
- Metrical Analyses of Tragic Choruses I–III. London 1971–1983 (vol. 1, BICS Suppl. XXI,1, London 1971; vol. 2 BICS Suppl. XXI,2, London 1981; vol. 3 BICS Suppl. XXI,3, London 1983) – Published posthumously.

A full list may be found in the Bibliography in Dale's Collected Papers (listed above).

== Sources ==
- Bourke, Joanna (2022). Birkbeck: 200 Years of Radical Learning for Working People. Oxford University Press. ISBN 978-0-19-284663-1.
- Burnett, Anne Pippin (1970). "Reviewed Work: Euripides: "Helen" by A. M. Dale". Classical Philology. 65 (2): 117–120. doi:10.1086/365600. JSTOR 268577.
- Kopff, E. Christian (2005). "Metrics, Manuscripts and A. M. Dale". Quaderni Urbinati di Cultura Classica. New Series. 80 (2): 127–130. JSTOR 20546862.
- Parker, Laetitia (2016). "A. M. Dale". In Wyles, Rosie; Hall, Edith (eds.). Women Classical Scholars: Unsealing the Fountain from the Renaissance to Jacqueline de Romilly. Oxford University Press. pp. 335–344. ISBN 978-0-19-872520-6.
- Turner, Eric Gardner (1969) [7 February 1967]. "Obituary". In Webster, T. B. L.; Turner, Eric Gardner (eds.). Collected Papers of A. M. Dale. Cambridge University Press. pp. ix–x. ISBN 978-0-521-04763-0.
- Turing, Dermot (2025). Mixed Signals: How History Overlooked Women Codebreakers. Cheltenham: The History Press. ISBN 978-1-80399-794-0.
- Winnington-Ingram, Reginald Pepys (1967). "Amy Marjorie Dale 1902–1967" (PDF). Proceedings of the British Academy. 53: 423–436.
- Wyles, Rosie; Hall, Edith, eds. (2016). Women Classical Scholars: Unsealing the Fountain from the Renaissance to Jacqueline de Romilly. Oxford University Press. ISBN 9780198725206.
