= Mai Musié =

Classicist and public historian

Mai Musié is a historian of antiquity and expert in public engagement. She focuses on race and ethnicity in antiquity, Ge’ez manuscripts, and interconnectivity between the ancient Mediterranean world and North-East Africa.

== Early life and education ==
Musié was a refugee from Eritrea via Sudan, arriving in Britain at the age of eight. Musié received her BA, MA and PhD from Swansea University in 2019. Her doctoral thesis explored the representation of Persians in the ancient novel. It was supervised by J. R. Morgan.

== Career ==
Musié won the Classical Association Prize in 2019. Other winners include Natalie Haynes, Frank McGuinness, Charlotte Higgins. She was Public Engagement Manager at the Bodleian Libraries, Oxford University, and she was an Early Career Fellow For Inclusion, Participation and Engagement at the School of Advanced Studies, University of London. She is an Inclusion Advisory Group Member for the National Co-Ordinating Centre for Public Engagement.

As a public-facing historian, Musié has contributed widely to podcasts, TV, and radio, such as the BBC. Musié is a trustee of the charity Classics for All, and she co-edited the book Forward with Classics: Classical Languages in Schools and Communities, published by Bloomsbury.
