= Richard Janko =

American classical scholar (born 1955)

- Born: May 30, 1955 (age 71); Weston Underwood, Buckinghamshire, England
- Education: Bedford Modern School
- Alma mater: Trinity College, Cambridge
- Scientific career
- Workplaces: Columbia University; University of California, Los Angeles; University College London; University of Michigan
- Thesis: Studies in the language of the Homeric Hymns and the dating of early Greek epic poetry (1980)
- Doctoral advisor: John Chadwick
- Doctoral students: Armand D'Angour
- Website: www-personal.umich.edu/~rjanko/janko.html

Richard Charles Murray Janko (born May 30, 1955) is an Anglo-American classical scholar and the Gerald F. Else Distinguished University Professor of Classical Studies at the University of Michigan.

== Family and education ==
Janko was born on May 30, 1955, the descendant of an Austro-Hungarian revolutionary who left Vienna in 1848 to find refuge in London.

He was educated at Bedford Modern School. With the encouragement of his parents, an electrician and a shopkeeper, he learned Ancient Greek under Andrew Wilson (who later translated Harry Potter and the Philosopher's Stone).

Janko won a scholarship to Trinity College, Cambridge. As a student he took part in the British excavations at Agios Stephanos in Laconia, directed by Lord William Taylour, and wrote a doctoral dissertation under John Chadwick. He was elected a Research Fellow of Trinity College, Cambridge.

== Scholarship ==
Janko's scholarship has focused primarily upon Bronze Age Greece, archaic Greek epic, especially the Iliad of Homer, ancient literary criticism, especially the Poetics of Aristotle, early Greek religion and philosophy (especially Empedocles, Orphism, and the Derveni papyrus), and the reconstruction of ancient books on papyrus-rolls. His study of epic diction, Homer, Hesiod and the Hymns, established by a statistical study of language the relative chronology of the corpus of early Greek epic poetry.

Janko published a controversial book Aristotle on Comedy, arguing that a summary of the lost second book of Aristotle's Poetics on comedy and humour survives in a tenth-century manuscript in Paris, the Tractatus coislinianus. This was shortly followed by an annotated translation of Aristotle's Poetics itself. He wrote the volume on Homer's Iliad 13-16 in the set of commentaries on Homer's Iliad edited by Geoffrey Kirk; in this he argues that Homer was a consummate artist of oral poetry.

Janko was awarded a John Simon Guggenheim Memorial Fellowship in 1986. In 1993 he delivered the Martin Classical Lectures on ancient literary criticism at Oberlin College. His edition and translation of Philodemus' On Poems Book 1, reconstructed from a series of Herculaneum papyri, was awarded the Goodwin Award of Merit by the American Philological Association in 2001.

In 2008 he brought out the site-report of the excavations at the Bronze Age and Medieval settlement of Ayios Stephanos in Laconia; these excavations do much to clarify relations between Minoan Crete and the Mycenaean mainland. In 2011 he published Philodemus' On Poems Books 3 and 4, which contains fragments of Aristotle's lost dialog On Poets.

== University positions ==
Janko is currently the Gerald F. Else Distinguished University Professor of Classical Studies at the University of Michigan. In this role, Janko instructs a range of courses, which include courses looking at Homer and the Trojan War and the playwright, Euripides as of 2024.

He has previously held positions at St. Andrews University, Columbia University, UCLA and University College London, where he was Professor of Greek. He has held Visiting Professorships at the Scuola Normale Superiore in Pisa and at the American School of Classical Studies in Athens.

He was elected to the American Academy of Arts and Sciences in 2006, and to the American Philosophical Society in 2009.

== Publications ==
=== Monographs, commentaries and critical editions ===
- Homer, Hesiod and the Hymns: diachronic development in epic diction (Cambridge, 1982)
- Aristotle on Comedy: towards a reconstruction of Poetics II (London, 1984)
- Aristotle: Poetics, with the Tractatus Coislinianus, reconstruction of Poetics II, and the fragments of the On Poets (Indianapolis, 1987)
- (G.S. Kirk, series editor) The Iliad. A Commentary. 4: Books 13–16 (Cambridge, 1994)
- Philodemus: the Aesthetic Works. Vol. I/1: On Poems Book 1 (Oxford, 2001)
- (with W.D. Taylour) "Ayios Stephanos: a Bronze Age and Medieval Settlement in Southern Laconia" (Supplement 44 to the Annual of the British School at Athens, London, 2008)
- Philodemus: the Aesthetic Works. Vol. I/3: Philodemus, On Poems Books 3–4, with the Fragments of Aristotle, On Poets (Oxford, 2011)

=== Articles (selected) ===
- "The structure of the Homeric Hymns: a study in genre", Hermes 109 (1981) 9–24.
- "Equivalent formulae in the Greek epos", Mnemosyne 34 (1981) 251–64.
- "ΑΘΑΝΑΤΟΣ ΚΑΙ ΑΓΗΡΩΣ: the genealogy of a formula", Mnemosyne 34 (1981) 382–5.
- "A fragment of Aristotle's Poetics from Porphyry, concerning synonymy", Classical Quarterly 32 (1982) 323–6.
- "P. Oxy. 2509: Hesiod's Catalogue on Actaeon", Phoenix 39 (1985) 299–307.
- "The Shield of Heracles and the legend of Cycnus", Classical Quarterly 36 (1986) 38–59.
- "Polydeukes and Deukalion", Glotta 65 (1987) 69–72.
- "Linear A and the direction of the earliest Cypro-Minoan writing", in "Studies presented to John Chadwick", Salamanca 1987, 311–18.
- "Dictation and redaction: the Iliad and its editors", Classical Antiquity 9 (1990) 326–34.
- "Philodemus' On Poems and Aristotle's On Poets, Cronache Ercolanesi 21 (1991) 5–64.
- "The Homeric poems as oral dictated texts", Classical Quarterly 48 (1998) 1–13.
- "The Derveni Papyrus (Diagoras of Melos, Apopyrgizontes Logoi?): a New Translation", Classical Philology 94 (2001) 1–32 .
- "The Derveni Papyrus: an Interim Text", Zeitschrift für Papyrologie und Epigraphik 141 (2002) 1–62.
- "The Trojan War", "Times Literary Supplement", 15 April 2005, 6–7.
- "Sappho Revisited', "Times Literary Supplement", 23 December 2005, 19–20.
- "Empedocles' On Nature I 233-364: a New Reconstruction of P. Strasb. Inv. 1665-6", Zeitschrift für Papyrologie und Epigraphik 150 (2005) 1–26.
- "Reconstructing (again) the Opening of the Derveni Papyrus", Zeitschrift für Papyrologie und Epigraphik 166 (2008) 37–51.
- "πρῶτόν τε καὶ ὕστατον αἰὲν ἀείδειν: relative chronology and the literary history of the Greek epos," in "Relative Chronology and the Literary History of the Early Greek Epos", Ø. Andersen and D. Haug (edd.), Cambridge 2011, 20–43.
- "The Hexametric Incantations against Witchcraft in the Getty Museum: from Archetype to Exemplar," in "The Getty Hexameters: Poetry, Magic, and Mystery in Ancient Greek Selinous", C. A. Faraone and D. Obbink (edd.), Oxford 2013, 31–56.
- "The Brothers Poem by Sappho", "Times Literary Supplement" 28 March 2014, 22.
- “Parmenides in the Derveni Papyrus: New Images for a New Edition.”, Zeitschrift Für Papyrologie Und Epigraphik 200 (2016): 3–23.

Academic offices
Preceded by P. E. Easterling	Professor of Greek, University College, London; 1995 - 2002	Succeeded by Chris Carey
