= Oxford Classical Texts =

Book series of classical texts

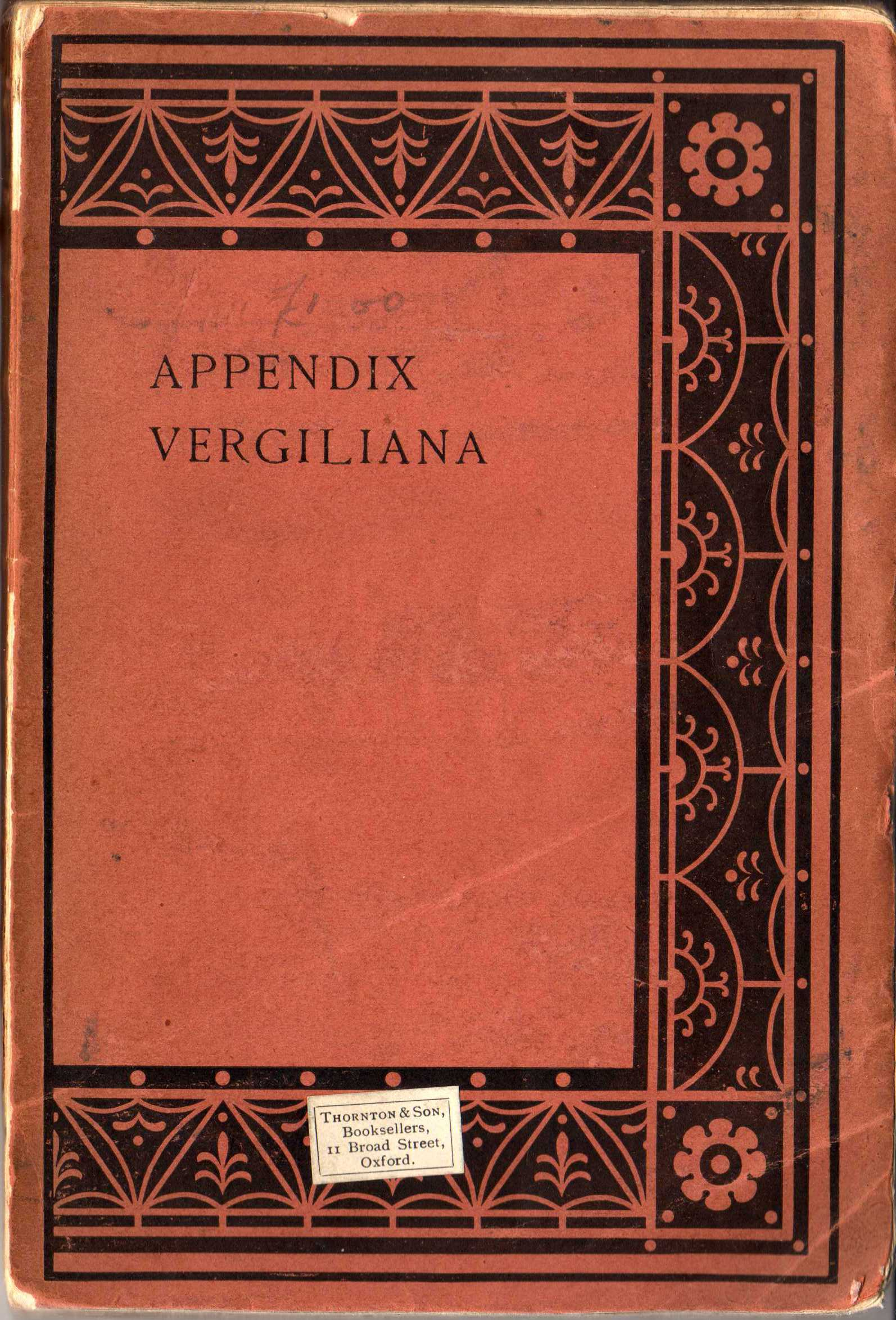
Book cover, Appendix Vergiliana publ. Oxford, 1927

Oxford Classical Texts (OCT), or Scriptorum Classicorum Bibliotheca Oxoniensis, is a series of books published by Oxford Clarendon Press. It contains texts of ancient Greek and Latin literature, such as Homer's Odyssey and Virgil's Aeneid, in the original language with a critical apparatus. Works of science and mathematics, such as Euclid's Elements, are generally not represented. Since the books are meant primarily for serious students of the classics, the prefaces and notes have traditionally been in Latin (so that the books are written in the classical languages from the title page to the index), and no translations or explanatory notes are included. Several recent volumes, beginning with Lloyd-Jones and Wilson's 1990 edition of Sophocles, have broken with tradition and feature introductions written in English (though the critical apparatus is still in Latin).

In format, Oxford Classical Texts have always been published in British Crown octavo (7½ by 5¼ inches). Initially they were produced in three formats: Cloth, the standard style, bound in dark blue or black cloth bindings; Interleaved, for scholars and students, where each pair of printed leaves had a blank leaf bound between them for the scholar's notes, also bound in dark blue or black cloth; and India paper, for travellers and readers, printed on strong, thin India paper and bound in dark red cloth bindings. However, by the 1950s, only standard cloth editions were in general issue, though some interleaved copies were still produced into the 1960s.

Oxoniensis is an adjective used mainly to denote a single volume of the series (fully: editio Oxoniensis), rarely the whole collection; correspondingly, Teubneriana is used with reference to the Bibliotheca Scriptorum Graecorum et Romanorum Teubneriana, a series with the same aim as the OCT. The Loeb Classical Library, which includes facing English translations with sparse critical notes, is aimed at a more general audience, as is the Collection Budé, which includes French translations and more substantial commentary. Similar to the Collection Budé is the Colección Alma Mater, edited by the CSIC, with Spanish translations and substantial commentary.

== Selective list of titles ==
- Aeschylus (1972). Page, D. L. (ed.). Septem quae supersunt tragoediae. Oxford: Clarendon Press. ISBN 9780198145707.
- Alcaeus and Sappho: Lobel, E.; Page, D. L., eds. (1955). Poetarum Lesbiorum fragmenta. Oxford: Clarendon Press.
- Antiphon; Andocides (2018). Dilts, M. R.; Murphy, D. J. (eds.). Orationes. Oxford: Clarendon Press. ISBN 9780199605477.
- Appendix Vergiliana: Clausen, W. V.; Goodyear, F. R. D.; Kenney, E. J.; Richmond, J. A., eds. (1965). Appendix Vergiliana. Oxford: Clarendon Press. ISBN 9780198146483.
- Apuleius (2012). Zimmermann, M. (ed.). Metamorphoseon libri XI. Oxford: Clarendon Press. ISBN 9780199277025.
- Apuleius (2019). Magnaldi, G. (ed.). Opera philosophica. Oxford: Clarendon Press. ISBN 9780198841418.
- Apuleius (2025). Stramaglia, A.; Corcella, A. (eds.). Operum deperditorum reliquiae. Oxford: Clarendon Press. ISBN 9780198940081.
- Apollonius Rhodius (1961). Fränkel, H. (ed.). Argonautica. Oxford: Clarendon Press. ISBN 9780198145592.
- Aristophanes (2007a). Wilson, N. G. (ed.). Fabulae. Vol. I. Oxford: Clarendon Press. ISBN 9780198721802.
- Aristophanes (2007b). Wilson, N. G. (ed.). Fabulae. Vol. II. Oxford: Clarendon Press. ISBN 9780198721819.
- Aristoteles (1894). Bywater, I. (ed.). Ethica Nicomachea. Oxford: Clarendon Press.
- Aristoteles (1920). Kenyon, F. G. (ed.). Atheniensium respublica. Oxford: Clarendon Press.
- Aristoteles (1936). Allan, D. J. (ed.). De caelo. Oxford: Clarendon Press.
- Aristoteles (1949). Minio-Paluello, L. (ed.). Categoriae et Liber de interpretatione. Oxford: Clarendon Press. ISBN 9780198145073.
- Aristoteles (1951). Ross, W. D. (ed.). Physica. Oxford: Clarendon Press.
- Aristoteles (1955). Ross, W. D. (ed.). Fragmenta selecta. Oxford: Clarendon Press. ISBN 9780198145127.
- Aristoteles (1958). Ross, W. D. (ed.). Topica et Sophistici elenchi. Oxford: Clarendon Press. ISBN 9780198145165.
- Aristoteles (1959). Ross, W. D. (ed.). Ars rhetorica. Oxford: Clarendon Press. ISBN 9780198145578.
- Aristoteles (1960). Jaeger, W. W. (ed.). Metaphysica. Oxford: Clarendon Press.
- Aristoteles (1964). Minio-Paluello, L.; Ross, W. D. (eds.). Analytica Priora et Posteriora. Oxford: Clarendon Press. ISBN 9780198145622.
- Aristoteles (1965). Kassel, R. (ed.). De arte poetica. Oxford: Clarendon Press. ISBN 9780198145646.
- Aristoteles (1991). Walzer, R. R.; Mingay, J. M. (eds.). Ethica Eudemia. Oxford: Clarendon Press. ISBN 9780198145752.
- Aristoteles (2003). Rowe, C. (ed.). Ethica Eudemia. Oxford: Clarendon Press. ISBN 9780198838326.
- Bucolic Poets (Greek): Gow, A. S. F., ed. (1963). Bucolici Graeci. Oxford: Clarendon Press. ISBN 9780198145172.
- Caesar (1900). Du Pontet, R. (ed.). Commentarii. Vol. I. Oxford: Clarendon Press.
- Caesar (1901). Du Pontet, R. (ed.). Commentarii. Vol. II. Oxford: Clarendon Press.
- Caesar (2015). Damon, C. (ed.). Commentarii de bello civili. Oxford: Clarendon Press. ISBN 9780199659746.
- Catullus (1963). Mynors, R. A. B. (ed.). Carmina. Oxford: Clarendon Press. ISBN 9780198146049.
- Cicero (1901). Clark, A. C. (ed.). Orationes. Vol. II. Oxford: Clarendon Press.
- Cicero (1902). Wilkins, A. S. (ed.). Rhetorica. Vol. I. Oxford: Clarendon Press.
- Cicero (1903). Wilkins, A. S. (ed.). Rhetorica. Vol. II. Oxford: Clarendon Press.
- Cicero (1905). Clark, A. C. (ed.). Orationes. Vol. I. Oxford: Clarendon Press.
- Cicero (1907). Peterson, W. (ed.). Orationes. Vol. III. Oxford: Clarendon Press.
- Cicero (1909). Clark, A. C. (ed.). Orationes. Vol. IV. Oxford: Clarendon Press.
- Cicero (1911a). Peterson, W. (ed.). Orationes. Vol. V. Oxford: Clarendon Press.
- Cicero (1911b). Clark, A. C. (ed.). Orationes. Vol. VI. Oxford: Clarendon Press.
- Cicero (1958). Watt, W. S. (ed.). Epistulae. Vol. III. Oxford: Clarendon Press. ISBN 9780198146148.
- Cicero (1961). Shackleton Bailey, D. R. (ed.). Epistulae. Vol. II.ii. Oxford: Clarendon Press. ISBN 9780198146414.
- Cicero (1965). Watt, W. S. (ed.). Epistulae. Vol. II.i. Oxford: Clarendon Press. ISBN 9780198146452.
- Cicero (1982). Watt, W. S. (ed.). Epistulae. Vol. I (2nd ed.). Oxford: Clarendon Press. ISBN 9780198146605.
- Cicero (1994). Winterbottom, M. (ed.). De officiis. Oxford: Clarendon Press. ISBN 9780198146735.
- Cicero (1998). Reynolds, L. D. (ed.). De finibus bonorum et malorum. Oxford: Clarendon Press. ISBN 9780198146704.
- Cicero (2006). Powell, J. G. F. (ed.). De re publica; De legibus; Cato Maior de senectute; Laelius de amiciția. Oxford: Clarendon Press. ISBN 9780198146698.
- Cicero (2022). Reinhardt, T. (ed.). Academica; Lucullus. Oxford: Clarendon Press. ISBN 9780199249572.
- Demosthenes (2002). Dilts, M. R. (ed.). Orationes. Vol. I. Oxford: Clarendon Press. ISBN 9780198721680.
- Demosthenes (2005). Dilts, M. R. (ed.). Orationes. Vol. II. Oxford: Clarendon Press. ISBN 9780198721697.
- Demosthenes (2008). Dilts, M. R. (ed.). Orationes. Vol. III. Oxford: Clarendon Press. ISBN 9780198721703.
- Demosthenes (2009). Dilts, M. R. (ed.). Orationes. Vol. IV. Oxford: Clarendon Press. ISBN 9780198721710.
- Dionysius Longinus (1968). Russell, D. A. (ed.). Libellus de sublimitate. Oxford: Clarendon Press.
- Elegy and iambus (Greek): West, M. L., ed. (1980). Delectus ex iambis et elegis Graecis. Oxford: Clarendon Press. ISBN 9780198145899.
- Epigram (Greek): Page, D. L., ed. (1975). Epigrammata Graeca. Oxford: Clarendon Press. ISBN 9780198145813.
- Euripides (1981). Diggle, J. (ed.). Fabulae. Vol. II. Oxford: Clarendon Press. ISBN 9780198145905.
- Euripides (1984). Diggle, J. (ed.). Fabulae. Vol. I. Oxford: Clarendon Press. ISBN 9780198145943.
- Euripides (1994). Diggle, J. (ed.). Fabulae. Vol. III. Oxford: Clarendon Press. ISBN 9780198145950.
- Euripides (2025). Diggle, J. (ed.). Fabulae. Vol. II (2nd ed.). Oxford: Clarendon Press. ISBN 9780198865612.
- Gellius (1968a). Marshall, P. K. (ed.). Noctes Atticae. Vol. I. Oxford: Clarendon Press.
- Gellius (1968b). Marshall, P. K. (ed.). Noctes Atticae. Vol. II. Oxford: Clarendon Press.
- Gellius (1990a). Marshall, P. K. (ed.). Noctes Atticae. Vol. I (2nd ed.). Oxford: Clarendon Press.
- Gellius (1990b). Marshall, P. K. (ed.). Noctes Atticae. Vol. II (2nd ed.). Oxford: Clarendon Press.
- Gellius (2020a). Holford-Strevens, L. (ed.). Noctes Atticae. Vol. I. Oxford: Clarendon Press.
- Gellius (2020b). Holford-Strevens, L. (ed.). Noctes Atticae. Vol. II. Oxford: Clarendon Press. ISBN 9780199695027.
- Livius (1919). Walters, C. F.; Conway, R. S. (eds.). Ab Urbe condita. Vol. II. Oxford: Clarendon Press.
- Livius (1935). Walters, C. F.; Conway, R. S. (eds.). Ab Urbe condita. Vol. IV. Oxford: Clarendon Press.
- Livius (1974). Ogilvie, R. M. (ed.). Ab Urbe condita. Vol. I. Oxford: Clarendon Press.
- Livius (2016). Briscoe, J. (ed.). Ab Urbe condita. Vol. III. Oxford: Clarendon Press. ISBN 9780199686162.
- Lucretius (1922). Bailey, C. (ed.). De rerum natura (2nd ed.). Oxford: Clarendon Press.
- Hellenica Oxyrhynchia: Grenfell, B. P.; Hunt, A. S., eds. (1909). Hellenica Oxyrhynchia. Oxford: Clarendon Press.
- Herodotus (2015a). Wilson, N. G. (ed.). Historiae. Vol. I. Oxford: Clarendon Press. ISBN 9780199560707.
- Herodotus (2015b). Wilson, N. G. (ed.). Historiae. Vol. II. Oxford: Clarendon Press. ISBN 9780199560714.
- Hesiodus (1990). Merkelbach, R.; Solmsen, F.; West, M. L. (eds.). Theogonia; Opera et dies; Scutum; Fragmenta selecta (3rd ed.). Oxford: Clarendon Press.
- Homerus (1902a). Allen, T. W.; Monro, D. B. (eds.). Opera. Vol. I. Oxford: Clarendon Press.
- Homerus (1902b). Allen, T. W.; Monro, D. B. (eds.). Opera. Vol. II. Oxford: Clarendon Press.
- Homerus (1908a). Allen, T. W. (ed.). Opera. Vol. III. Oxford: Clarendon Press.
- Homerus (1908b). Allen, T. W. (ed.). Opera. Vol. IV. Oxford: Clarendon Press.
- Homerus (1912). Allen, T. W. (ed.). Opera. Vol. V. Oxford: Clarendon Press.
- Hyperides (1907). Kenyon, F. G. (ed.). Orationes et fragmenta. Oxford: Clarendon Press.
- Lucianus (1972). Macleod, M. D. (ed.). Opera. Vol. I. Oxford: Clarendon Press.
- Lucianus (1974). Macleod, M. D. (ed.). Opera. Vol. II. Oxford: Clarendon Press.
- Lucianus (1980). Macleod, M. D. (ed.). Opera. Vol. III. Oxford: Clarendon Press.
- Lucianus (1987). Macleod, M. D. (ed.). Opera. Vol. IV. Oxford: Clarendon Press.
- Lyric (Greek): Page, D. L., ed. (1968). Lyrica Graeca selecta. Oxford: Clarendon Press.
- Lyric (Greek): Page, D. L., ed. (1961). Poetae Melici Graeci. Oxford: Clarendon Press.
- Lyric (Greek): Page, D. L., ed. (1974). Supplementum lyricis Graecis. Oxford: Clarendon Press.
- Lyric (Greek): Page, D. L.; Davies, M., eds. (1991). Poetarum Melicorum Graecorum fragmenta. Vol. I (2nd ed.). Oxford: Clarendon Press. ISBN 9780198140467.
- Lysias (2007). Carey, C. (ed.). Orationes. Oxford: Clarendon Press.
- Martialis (1929). Lindsay, W. M. (ed.). Epigrammata (2nd ed.). Oxford: Clarendon Press.
- Menander (1960). Lloyd-Jones, H. (ed.). Dyscolus. Oxford: Clarendon Press.
- Menander (1972). Sandbach, F. H. (ed.). Reliquiae selectae. Oxford: Clarendon Press.
- Menander (1990). Sandbach, F. H. (ed.). Reliquiae selectae (2nd ed.). Oxford: Clarendon Press. ISBN 9780198147374.
- Ovidius (2004). Tarrant, R. J. (ed.). Metamorphoses. Oxford: Clarendon Press.
- Panegyrics (Latin): Mynors, R. A. B., ed. (1964). XII Panegyrici Latini. Oxford: Clarendon Press. ISBN 9780198146476.
- Photius (2026). Wilson, N. G. (ed.). Bibliotheca. Vol. I. Oxford: Clarendon Press. ISBN 9780198866640.
- Pindarus (1947). Bowra, C. (ed.). Carmina (2nd ed.). Oxford: Clarendon Press.
- Plato (1900). Burnet, J. (ed.). Opera. Vol. I. Oxford: Clarendon Press.
- Plato (1901). Burnet, J. (ed.). Opera. Vol. II. Oxford: Clarendon Press.
- Plato (1902). Burnet, J. (ed.). Respublica. Oxford: Clarendon Press.
- Plato (1903). Burnet, J. (ed.). Opera. Vol. III. Oxford: Clarendon Press.
- Plato (1905). Burnet, J. (ed.). Opera. Vol. IV. Oxford: Clarendon Press.
- Plato (1908a). Burnet, J. (ed.). Opera. Vol. V.1. Oxford: Clarendon Press.
- Plato (1908b). Burnet, J. (ed.). Opera. Vol. V.2. Oxford: Clarendon Press.
- Plato (1995). Duke, E. A.; Hicken, W. F.; Nicoll, W. S. M.; Robinson, D. B.; Strachan, J. C. G. (eds.). Opera. Vol. I. Oxford: Clarendon Press. ISBN 0-19-814569-1.
- Plato (2003). Slings, S. R. (ed.). Respublica. Oxford: Clarendon Press.
- Plautus (1904). Lindsay, W. M. (ed.). Comoediae. Vol. I. Oxford: Clarendon Press.
- Plautus (1905). Lindsay, W. M. (ed.). Comoediae. Vol. II. Oxford: Clarendon Press.
- Plinius (1963). Mynors, R. A. B. (ed.). Epistularum libri decem. Oxford: Clarendon Press.
- Plotinus (1964). Henry, P.; Schwyzer, H. R. (eds.). Opera. Vol. I. Oxford: Clarendon Press. ISBN 9780198145615.
- Plotinus (1977). Henry, P.; Schwyzer, H. R. (eds.). Opera. Vol. II. Oxford: Clarendon Press. ISBN 9780198145820.
- Plotinus (1983). Henry, P.; Schwyzer, H. R. (eds.). Opera. Vol. III. Oxford: Clarendon Press. ISBN 9780198145912.
- Proclus (2007). Steel, C. (ed.). In Platonis Parmenidem commentaria. Vol. I. Oxford: Clarendon Press. ISBN 9780199291816.
- Proclus (2008). Steel, C. (ed.). In Platonis Parmenidem commentaria. Vol. II. Oxford: Clarendon Press. ISBN 9780199291717.
- Proclus (2009). Steel, C.; Van Campe, L. (eds.). In Platonis Parmenidem commentaria. Vol. III. Oxford: Clarendon Press. ISBN 9780199291823.
- Proclus (2022a). Van Riel, G. (ed.). In Platonis Timaeum commentaria. Vol. I. Oxford: Clarendon Press. ISBN 9780192856036.
- Proclus (2022b). Van Riel, G. (ed.). In Platonis Timaeum commentaria. Vol. II. Oxford: Clarendon Press. ISBN 9780192856043.
- Proclus (2022c). Van Riel, G. (ed.). In Platonis Timaeum commentaria. Vol. III. Oxford: Clarendon Press. ISBN 9780192856050.
- Proclus (2022d). Van Riel, G. (ed.). In Platonis Timaeum commentaria. Vol. IV. Oxford: Clarendon Press. ISBN 9780192856067.
- Proclus (2022e). Van Riel, G. (ed.). In Platonis Timaeum commentaria. Vol. V. Oxford: Clarendon Press. ISBN 9780192856074.
- Sallustius (1991). Reynolds, L. D. (ed.). Opera. Oxford: Clarendon Press. ISBN 9780198146674.
- Seneca (1965a). Reynolds, L. D. (ed.). Epistulae. Vol. I. Oxford: Clarendon Press. ISBN 9780198146445.
- Seneca (1965b). Reynolds, L. D. (ed.). Epistulae. Vol. II. Oxford: Clarendon Press. ISBN 9780198146490.
- Seneca (1977). Reynolds, L. D. (ed.). Dialogi. Oxford: Clarendon Press.
- Seneca (1986). Zwierlein, O. (ed.). Tragoediae. Oxford: Clarendon Press. ISBN 9780198146575.
- Seneca (2022). Kaster, R. A. (ed.). De beneficiis; De clementia; Apocolocyntosis. Oxford: Clarendon Press. ISBN 9780198850731.
- Sophocles (1924). Pearson, A. C. (ed.). Fabulae. Oxford: Clarendon Press.
- Sophocles (1928). Pearson, A. C. (ed.). Fabulae (2nd ed.). Oxford: Clarendon Press.
- Sophocles (1990). Lloyd-Jones, H.; Wilson, N. G. (eds.). Fabulae. Oxford: Clarendon Press. ISBN 9780198145776.
- Statius (1906). Garrod, H. W. (ed.). Thebais et Achilleis. Oxford: Clarendon Press.
- Statius (1990). Courtney, E. (ed.). Silvae. Oxford: Clarendon Press. ISBN 9780198146834.
- Suetonius (2016). Kaster, R. A. (ed.). De vita Caesarum et De grammaticis et rhetoribus. Oxford: Clarendon Press. ISBN 9780198713791.
- Tacitus (1911). Fisher, C. D. (ed.). Historiae. Oxford: Clarendon Press.
- Tacitus (1975). Winterbottom, M.; Ogilvie, R. M. (eds.). Opera minora. Oxford: Clarendon Press.
- Terentius (1926). Kauer, R.; Lindsay, W. M. (eds.). Comoediae. Oxford: Clarendon Press.
- Terentius (1958). Kauer, R.; Lindsay, W. M.; Skutsch, O. (eds.). Comoediae (2nd ed.). Oxford: Clarendon Press.
- Theophrastus (1909). Diels, H. (ed.). Characteres. Oxford: Clarendon Press.
- Thucydides (1900). Stuart Jones, H. (ed.). Historiae. Vol. I. Oxford: Clarendon Press.
- Thucydides (1901). Stuart Jones, H. (ed.). Historiae. Vol. II. Oxford: Clarendon Press.
- Thucydides (1942a). Stuart Jones, H.; Powell, J. E. (eds.). Historiae. Vol. I (2nd ed.). Oxford: Clarendon Press.
- Thucydides (1942b). Stuart Jones, H.; Powell, J. E. (eds.). Historiae. Vol. II (2nd ed.). Oxford: Clarendon Press.
- Tragici Graeci (1912). Hunt, A. S. (ed.). Fragmenta papyracea. Oxford: Clarendon Press.
- Tragici Graeci (1998). Diggle, J. (ed.). Fragmenta selecta. Oxford: Clarendon Press. ISBN 9780198146858.
- Vegetius (2005). Reeve, M. D. (ed.). Epitoma rei militaris. Oxford: Clarendon Press. ISBN 9780199264643.
- Vergilius (1969). Mynors, R. A. B. (ed.). Opera. Oxford: Clarendon Press. ISBN 9780198146537.
- Vergilius (lives): Donatus; Servius; Probus; Focas; Hieronymus (1966). Hardie, C. (ed.). Vitae Vergilianae antiquae (2nd ed.). Clarendon Press.
- Xenophon (1900). Marchant, E. C. (ed.). Opera omnia. Vol. I. Oxford: Clarendon Press.
- Xenophon (1901). Marchant, E. C. (ed.). Opera omnia. Vol. II. Oxford: Clarendon Press.
- Xenophon (1904). Marchant, E. C. (ed.). Opera omnia. Vol. III. Oxford: Clarendon Press.
- Xenophon (1910). Marchant, E. C. (ed.). Opera omnia. Vol. IV. Oxford: Clarendon Press.
- Xenophon (1920). Marchant, E. C. (ed.). Opera omnia. Vol. V. Oxford: Clarendon Press.
