= Norma Miller (classicist) =

President of the classical association 1986-7

Academic background
- Education: University of Glasgow; University of Cambridge

Academic work
- Discipline: Classics
- Institutions: Royal Holloway, University of London

Norma P. Miller (–1988) was a classicist whose key works were translations of Tacitus and Menander. She was a lecturer in Classics at Royal Holloway.

== Education and career ==
Miller studied at the University of Glasgow and the University of Cambridge. She was a lecturer in Classics at Royal Holloway. She also lectured at the Trent University, Ontario, where she held an Ashley Fellowship in 1985–86. She also lectured at the University of Toronto. Her teaching included Greek drama and Miller supervised Phd students included Janet P. Bews. Miller was President of the Classical Association in 1987. After retirement she was a Reader Emeritus at the University of London. Miller was noted for her contributions to classical studies in the UK.

== Awards and honours ==
The Department of Classical Studies and Traill College at Trent University established the Norma Miller fund in her honour in 1991.

== Selected publications ==
=== Translations ===
- Menander. Plays and Fragments. 1987. Penguin Classics.
- Tacitus Annals I. 1963. Letchworth: Bradda Books

=== Commentaries ===
- Tacitus: Annals XIV: A Companion to the Penguin Translation. Bristol: Bristol Classical Press.

=== Articles ===
- 1964. Dramatic speech in Tacitus. American Journal of Philology 85: 279-296
- 1968. Tiberius speaks : an examination of the utterances ascribed to him in the Annals of Tacitus. American Journal of Philology 89: 1–19.
