= Tractatus coislinianus =

Ancient Greek manuscript

Tractatus coislinianus is an ancient Greek manuscript outlining a theory of comedy in the tradition of Aristotle's Poetics.

== Dramatic theory ==
The Tractatus states that comedy invokes laughter and pleasure, thus purging those emotions (catharsis), in a manner parallel to the description of tragedy in the Poetics. It proceeds to describe the devices used and manner in which catharsis is brought about.

== History ==
The manuscript now resides in Paris, France, at the Bibliothèque Nationale; it is labeled "Coislinianus 120". The 10th-century manuscript resided at Great Lavra on Mount Athos. In 1643, Athanasius Rhetor sent it from Cyprus to Séguier de Coislin. The classicist J. A. Cramer, poring through the collection of Henri Charles du Cambout de Coislin, was struck by the content, believing it to be the work of a commentator on Aristotle's theory of comedy, and published it in 1839. This belief was soon derided, but it has gained force in the 20th century; Richard Janko has argued that it is the notes or sketches of the lost second section of the Poetics. Nesselrath argues that it is a later work, perhaps by Theophrastus.

== Sources ==
- Janko, Richard, trans. 1987. Poetics with Tractatus Coislinianus, Reconstruction of Poetics II and the Fragments of the On Poets. By Aristotle. Cambridge: Hackett. ISBN 0-87220-033-7.
- Nesselrath, Heinz-Günther. 1990. Die attische mittlere Komödie: ihre Stellung in der antiken Literaturkritik und Literaturgeschichte. Untersuchungen zur antiken Literatur und Geschichte vol. 36. Berlin: Walter de Gruyter. ISBN 3-11-012196-4.
