= Judith Mossman (classicist) =

British classicist

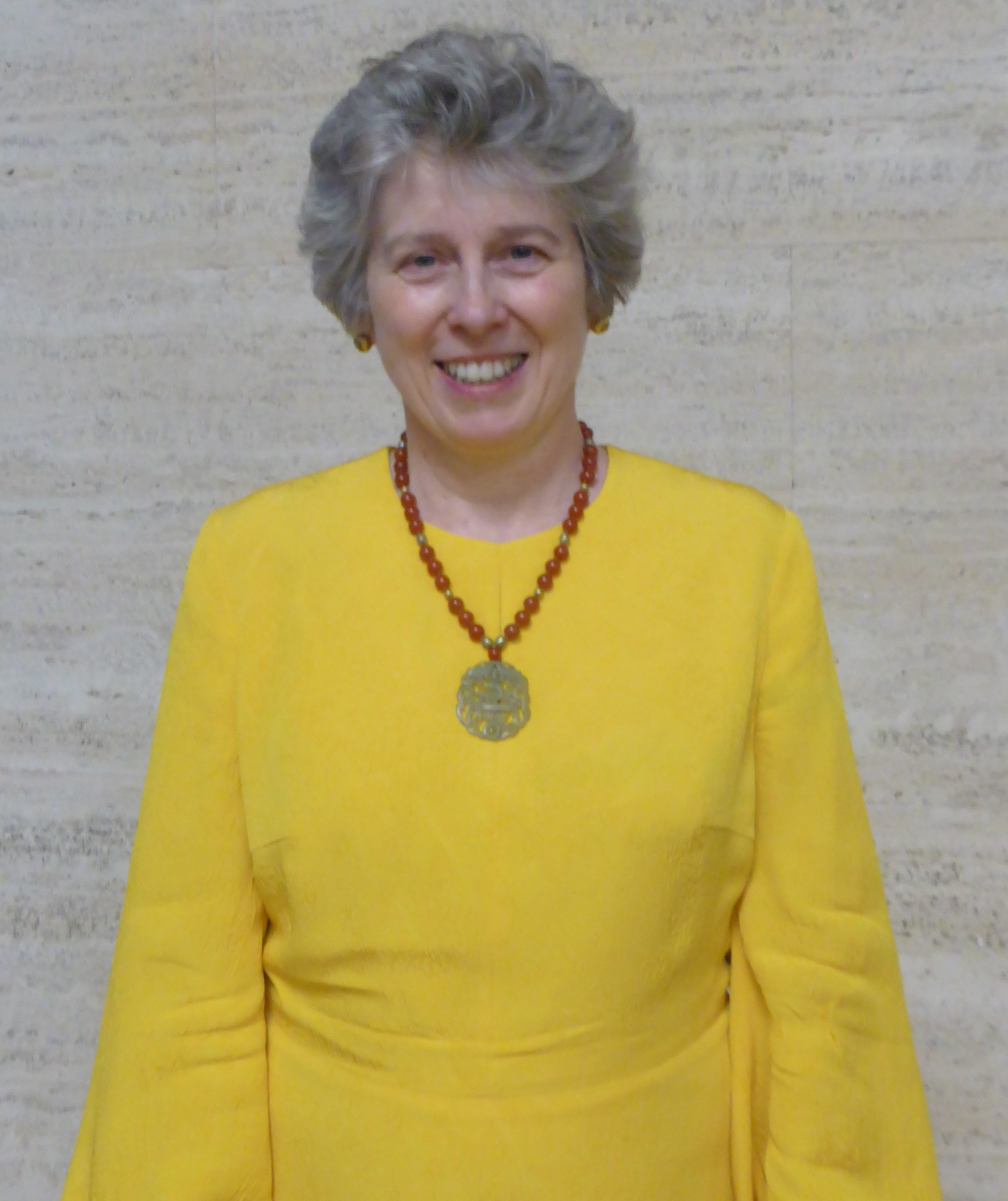
- Mossman in 2019
- Occupation: Classicist

Academic background
- Education: Corpus Christi College, Oxford

Academic work
- Discipline: Classics
- Sub-discipline: Greek literature
- Institutions: Trinity College, Dublin; University of Nottingham; Coventry University

Judith Mossman was Pro-Vice Chancellor for Arts and Humanities and Professor of Classics at the Centre for Arts, Memory, and Communities at Coventry University until summer 2024. She was the president of the Society for the Promotion of Hellenic Studies (2017–20). She is now professor emerita at Coventry University and chair of council of the Classical Association.

== Career ==
Mossman was educated at Woldingham School, before reading Classics at Corpus Christi College, Oxford. She received a D.Phil from Oxford University for a thesis entitled Euripides' Hecuba: A Re-evaluation, With Special Reference to Dramatic Technique. She held a Junior Research Fellowship at Christ Church and taught at Trinity College Dublin before moving to the University of Nottingham in 2004. Mossman was appointed to Coventry University in 2017. She was a governor of Woldingham School from 1990 to 1993.

In 2017 Mossman was elected president of the Society for the Promotion of Hellenic Studies, having previously been chair of the Joint Association of Classical Teachers (JACT) Classical Civilisation Committee. Having held the latter role, in 2011 she wrote to the Parliamentary Education Select Committee, urging that Classical Civilisations be included among the humanities subjects deemed acceptable for the English Baccalaureate.

Mossman specialises in Greek literature in the fifth century BC and the second–third centuries CE. Her work on Euripides' Hecuba has been praised for its "integrity" and "balance", and described as "stimulating and thought-provoking." She is a passionate advocate for the arts.

In November 2019, Mossman delivered the Nineteenth Dorothy Buchan Memorial Lecture in Ancient History at the University of Leicester. Her title was "At Home in Chaironeia: Domestic Detail in Plutarch". She gave the keynote presentation at the Women's Classical Committee Annual General Meeting, 24 April 2020. Her title was "Grass roots, Green shoots...is everything in the garden lovely?"

Mossman has contributed to media outlets including the BBC's Radio Four programme In Our Time, presented by Melvyn Bragg. In 2024, Mossman was an expert on an episode about Plutarch's Parallel Lives, alongside Paul Cartledge and Andrew Erskine.

Mossman was the third woman to hold the position of president of the Society for the Promotion of Hellenic Studies, succeeding Professor P. E. Easterling (1996–1999) and Professor Dorothy Tarrant (1954–1956). She is currently vice-president of the society. In 2024, Mossman succeeded Douglas Cairns as chair of council of the Classical Association.

== Selected publication ==
- 2001. "Women's speech in Greek tragedy: the case of Electra and Clytemnestra in Euripides' Electra", Classical Quarterly, 51(2), 374–384.
- 2005. "Women's Voices". In: Gregory, J (ed.), A Companion to Greek Tragedy Oxford. Blackwell. 352–65.
- 2005. "Taxis ou barbaros: Greek and Roman in Plutarch's Pyrrhus", Classical Quarterly, 55 (2), 498–517.
- 2007. 'Plutarch and English Biography', Hermathena, no. 183 (2007) 75-100
- 2011. Euripides, Medea (Classical texts). Aris and Phillips. ISBN 0856687839
- 2012. "Women's Voices in Sophocles". In: Markantonatos, A. (ed.) The Brill Companion to Sophocles. Brill. 491–506.
- 2016. "Shakespeare and the Classics", Omnibus 72, 1–3.
