= John E. Sharwood Smith =

English classicist (1919–2007)

John E. Sharwood Smith OBE DFC MA (1919-2007) was an English professor of Classics who wrote numerous books on classics and learning classics.

== Biography ==
His father, Edward Sharwood Smith, was a headmaster, most notably of Newbury Grammar School (now St. Bartholomew's School) who influenced his son's love of the classics.

John was awarded a scholarship in Classics to Jesus College, Cambridge, and started his degree in 1938. His studies were interrupted when he was called up in 1939 and following his older brother Bryan Sharwood-Smith he joined the RAF. He was trained to fly in the USA, completing a pilot training course at Lakeland Army Airfield, Florida. He was subsequently sent to fly first Wellington bombers and then Mosquito fighters in the WWII Burma campaign. He finished the war as an acting Squadron Leader and was awarded the DFC. When asked why, he typically replied, 'for surviving'.

Resuming his studies, he completed his degree and pursued an academic career in teaching classics. He was one of the key founders of the Joint Association of Classical Teachers. and instrumental in the launch of the JACT Greek summer school in 1968. For the following twelve years, he was the editor of JACT's magazine Didaskalos, writing for it several times. Following this, he wrote numerous books on classics and teaching classics, including On Teaching Classics (1977) and Greece and the Persians (1989). He believed heavily in teaching classics in a way that would help student live their lives; by asking questions about how the world worked, students can understand "the choices perennially open to human beings and human societies in the conduct of their affairs." He was awarded an OBE for services to Education in 1980.

After his retirement, he resided in Painswick with his wife until his death. During this time he wrote three volumes of personal reminiscences including 'The Message in the Bottle' (2000) about his wartime experiences.

Speaking about him after his death, John's son, Nick Sharwood Smith, described him as "an excellent speaker" and that he always had "a desire to understand himself better."
