= Classical Association =

Educational organisation in the UK

- Founded: 19 December 1903
- Type: Charity
- Registration no.: 313371
- Coordinates: 51.6418°N 0.4659°W
- Region served: United Kingdom
- Services: To promote the development and maintain the well-being of Classical Studies.
- Revenue: £495,980 (2020)
- Employees: 5 (2023)
- Website: classicalassociation.org

The Classical Association (CA) is an educational organisation which aims to promote and widen access to the study of classical subjects in the United Kingdom. Founded in 1903, the Classical Association supports and advances classical learning in schools, colleges, universities and local areas, and it has a wide membership. The Classical Association is a member of the Council for Subject Associations and is a registered charity.

== Foundation ==
The Association was founded on 19 December 1903 at a public meeting held at University College London, and its objects are defined in its constitution as:

1. The advancement of education by the promotion, development and maintenance of classical studies
2. To increase public awareness of the contribution and importance of classics to education and public life.

It was founded with the name "The Classical Association of England and Wales" but the name was soon changed to "The Classical Association".

The incumbent Chair of the Classical Association Council is Professor Judith Mossman.

== Activities ==
The Association is a major provider of grants to classical projects in the UK. It provides financial support for outreach and engagement projects, which seek to increase access to classics, widen participation and pursue equality, diversity and inclusion objectives in UK classics. It awarded more than £2 million of grants between 2003 and 2023.

The Classical Association sponsors an annual Conference, which is hosted each year by a different UK university and brings together everybody from career classicists to teachers, independent researchers, students of all ages and anybody interested in the ancient world, to share research, exchange knowledge and professional practice and celebrate the work of the classics community.

The Classical Association Teaching Board (CATB), made up of teachers, examiners, subject representatives, academics, curriculum providers and practitioners, was established in 2015 to support teachers of classical subjects and ancient history at all levels. The Classical Association provides professional development, resources, grants and support networks to teachers and students, as well as organising several annual competitions and running its own podcast, The Classics Podcast.

Across England and Wales, the Classical Association has more than 25 affiliated local branches, which organise a variety of classical activities and have their own presidents, membership and communities.

The Association awards its prestigious annual CA Prize to the person, group, or project whose work is felt to have raised the profile of Classics in the public eye, thereby recognising outstanding contributions to the promotion of Classics in the UK. Former winners include Tom Holland (author), Caroline Lawrence, Cora Beth Fraser, Mary Beard, Mai Musié, Natalie Haynes, Rupert Goold, Gregory Doran and Michael Scott.

== Publications ==
The Association publishes three journals: The Classical Review, The Classical Quarterly and Greece & Rome, and, following its merger with the Joint Association of Classical Teachers in 2015, the CA took over publication of JACT's journals, the Journal of Classics Teaching (online only) and Omnibus. The CA also commissions titles in the New Surveys in the Classics series (published by Cambridge University Press).

The Association celebrated its centenary in 2003 by publishing a book, The Classical Association: the First Century 1903–2003, edited by Dr Christopher Stray; this includes a history of the association and studies of various aspects of its activities over its first century, including an account of the Classical Association of Scotland.

== List of Honorary Presidents ==
- Sir Richard Henn Collins (1903–)
- Lord Halsbury (1905–6)
- Lord Curzon (1906–7)
- S. H. Butcher (1907–8)
- H. H. Asquith (1908–9)
- Evelyn Baring, 1st Earl of Cromer (1909–10)
- Sir Archibald Geikie (1910–11)
- Edward Hicks (1911–12)
- Henry Montague Butler (1912–13)
- Frederic Kenyon (1913–14)
- Sir William Ridgeway (1914–15)
- Sir William Richmond (1915–16)
- James Bryce, Viscount Bryce (1916–17)
- Gilbert Murray (1917–18)
- Henry Fisher (1918–19)
- Sir William Osler (1919–)
- Walter Leaf (1921–)
- Alfred, 1st Viscount Milner (1921–22)
- John William Mackail (1923–4)
- Robert Crewe-Milnes, Marquess of Crewe (1923–24)
- John Percival Postgate (1925–6)
- Stanley Baldwin (1925-26–)
- Gordon, Viscount Hewart (1926–27)
- Robert Seymour Conway (1927–28)
- D'Arcy Wentworth Thompson (1928–29)
- William Temple, Archbishop of York (1929–30)
- Albert Curtis Clark (1930–31)
- William David Ross (1932)
- Sir George Macdonald (1932– )
- William Inge (1933–34)
- Cyril Bailey (1934–35)
- Leo Amery (1935–36)
- Terrot Reaveley Glover (1937–38)
- Sir Stephen Gaselee (diplomat) (1940–1)
- Sir Richard Livingstone (1941–2)
- T. S. Eliot (1942–3)
- John Sheppard (1943–)
- Maurice Bowra (1945–)
- Sir Frank Adcock (1948–9)
- Lord Soulbury (1949–)
- Harold Nicolson (1951–2)
- William Calder (1952–3)
- Lord Samuel (1953–4)
- Gilbert Murray (1954–5)
- Dr G. M. Young (1955–6)
- Sir Harold Iaris Bell (1956–7)
- John Spedan Lewis (1957–8)
- Dorothy Tarrant (1958–9)
- Sir Cyril Hinshelwood (1959–)
- Lord Hailsham (1961–2)
- William Beare (1962–3)
- Professor E. R. Dodds (1963–4)
- Sir Basil Blackwell (1964–5)
- Professor Sir Roger Mynors (1965–6)
- Dilys Powell (1966–7)
- Professor W. K. C. Guthrie (1967–8)
- Montague Woodhouse (1968–9)
- Professor F. W. Walbank (1969–70)
- Sir John Hackett (1970–1)
- Patrick Wilkinson (1971–2)
- Lord Boyle of Handsworth (1972–3)
- Professor Moses Finley (1973–4)
- Dom David Knowles (1974–5)
- Professor Kenneth Dover (1975–6)
- Professor David Daube (1976–7)
- Dr Michael Grant (1977–8)
- Professor Brinley Rees (1978–9)
- Lord Wolfenden (1979–80)
- Professor R. D. Williams (1980–1)
- Sir David Hunt (1981–2)
- Professor E. J. Kenney (1982–3)
- Professor Raymond Williams (1983–4)
- Professor Eric Handley (1984–5)
- Sir Nicholas Goodison (1985–6)
- Professor Norma Miller (1986–7)
- Tony Harrison (1987–8)
- Professor Patricia Easterling (1988–9)
- Sir Jeremy Morse (1989–90)
- Professor George Kerferd (1990–1)
- Robert Runcie, Baron Runcie (1991–2)
- Professor Fergus Millar (1992–3)
- Colin Haycraft (1993–4)
- Professor David West (1994–5)
- Anthony Cleaver (1995–6)
- Carol Handley (1996–7)
- Lindsey Davis (1997–8)
- Professor Oliver Taplin (1998–9)
- Emma Kirkby (1999–2000)
- Professor Peter Wiseman (2000–1)
- Philip Howard (2001–2)
- Dr Peter Jones (2002–3)
- Susan Greenfield, Baroness Greenfield (2003–4)
- Professor Malcolm Schofield (2006–7)
- Robert Harris (2007–8)
- Professor Richard Seaford (2008–9)
- Dr Richard Stoneman (2009–10)
- Professor Christopher Rowe (2010–11)
- Sir Peter Stothard (2011–12)
- Professor Robin Osborne (2012–13)
- Martha Kearney (2013–14)
- Professor P. J. Rhodes (2014–15).
- Professor Robert Crawford (2015–16)
- Professor Robert Fowler (2016–17)
- Dr Rowan Williams (2017–18)
- Dame Professor Mary Beard (2018–19)
- Mari Williams (2020–1)
- Stephen Fry (2021–2)
- Professor M. M. McCabe (2022–3)
- Professor Anne Carson (2023–4)
- Professor Stephen Halliwell (2024–5)
- Professor Michael Wood (2025–6)

== List of Council Chairs ==
- Professor Douglas Cairns (2024)
- Professor Judith Mossman (2024–present)
