= Christopher Pelling =

British historian of ancient Greece (born 1947)

Christopher Brendan Reginald Pelling, FBA FLSW (born 14 December 1947) is a British classical scholar. He was the Regius Professor of Greek, at Christ Church, Oxford, from 2003 to 2015. He was President of the Hellenic Society from 2006 to 2008.

His research interests range over Greek and Latin historiography and biography, and also over other areas of Greek literature, especially tragedy.

== Biography ==
Educated at Cardiff High School, Pelling in the 1960s was a Senior Scholar at Balliol College, Oxford and then spent twenty-nine years as Fellow and Praelector in Classics at University College, Oxford. He broke new ground through applying literary analysis to historical texts, ranging from Tacitus to Plutarch. At the same time, he was a generous tutor, well regarded by students. He returned to Christ Church, Oxford in 2003 when he became Regius Professor of Greek. He was elected a Fellow of the British Academy (FBA) in 2009. He was elected a Fellow of the Learned Society of Wales in 2011.

Pelling's doctoral students at Oxford included Judith Mossman and Tim Rood.

== Radio and TV appearances ==
- 2008-01-07, BBC Radio 3, The Essay – Greek And Latin Voices

Chris Pelling (series co-anchor) explores how Thucydides's work on the Peloponnesian War furthers people's understanding of contemporary warfare, from Vietnam to Iraq.

- 1997-12-16, BBC 2, Timewatch - In Search of Cleopatra

== Bibliography ==
- Pelling, Christopher (1988), Plutarch: Life of Antony, Clarendon Press
- Pelling, Christopher (1990), Characterization and individuality in Greek literature, Clarendon Press, ISBN 0-19-814058-4
- Pelling, Christopher (2000), Literary texts and the Greek historian, Routledge, ISBN 0-203-01027-2
- Pelling, Christopher (2002), Plutarch and History: Eighteen Studies, London: Classical Press of Wales, ISBN 0-7156-3128-4
- Pelling, Christopher (2011), Plutarch Caesar: Translated with an Introduction and Commentary, Clarendon Press

== Press articles ==
- Grimston, Jack (12 August 2007), "A-level Latin and Greek to become ancient history", Sunday Times, London

Academic offices
Preceded by Peter J. Parsons	Regius Professor of Greek; University of Oxford; 2003 to 2015	Succeeded by Gregory Hutchinson
