= P. E. Easterling =

British classical scholar (1934–2026)

P. E. Easterling FBA
- Born: Patricia Elizabeth Fairfax; 11 March 1934; Blackburn, Lancashire, England
- Died: 18 August 2026 (aged 92)
- Spouse: John Easterling
- Children: 1

Academic background
- Education: Newnham College, Cambridge
- Academic advisor: Joyce Reynolds

Academic work
- Discipline: Classics
- Sub-discipline: Greek tragedy, Sophocles
- Institutions: University of Manchester; University College London; University of Cambridge
- Doctoral students: Chris Carey, Simon Goldhill, Barbara Graziosi

Patricia Elizabeth Easterling (née Fairfax; 11 March 1934 – 18 August 2026) was an English classical scholar, recognised as an expert on the work of Sophocles. She was Regius Professor of Greek at the University of Cambridge from 1994 to 2001, the 36th person and the first and so far the only woman to hold the post.

== Early life and education ==
Patricia Fairfax was born in Blackburn, Lancashire, an only child. She was the first person in her family to finish secondary school, at Blackburn High School for Girls, and then graduated with first class honours and distinction in Classics at Newnham College, Cambridge in 1955. She performed twice in the Cambridge Greek Play, acting in 1953 in Aeschylus Agamemnon and 1956 in Euripides Bacchae, alongside her later husband, John Easterling. As a student she was tutored by Joyce Reynolds; in 2014 she, Reynolds, and the younger Newnham classicist Mary Beard held a joint 235th birthday celebration at the Tower of London.

== Career ==
After an initial spell as a lecturer at the University of Manchester (1957–1958), Easterling taught within the Cambridge Classics Faculty as a Fellow of Newnham College until 1987. She directed the Cambridge Greek Play twice in that time: the Medea in 1974, and Sophocles's Electra in 1977. In 1987 she took up the position of Professor of Greek at University College London. During her time at London, Easterling was a major contributor to the graduate community of the Institute of Classical Studies, and to Greek Drama in the city, inaugurating the Greek Drama Festival and UCL's Greek Play in 1987. She was also a major supporter of the introduction of the JACT Classical Civilisation Summer School in the second half of the 1980s. Easterling was remembered for supporting students and encouraging and inspiring their future research careers, throughout her time at London. She chaired the Council of University Classics Departments from 1990-1993, the first woman to do so.

In 1994, Easterling returned to Cambridge and Newnham as the 36th Regius Professor of Greek, the first and so far only woman to hold that post since its endowment by Henry VIII.

Easterling's doctoral students at Cambridge included Chris Carey, Simon Goldhill, and Barbara Graziosi.

== Academic interests ==
Easterling specialised in Greek literature, particularly tragedy, and was recognised as a particular expert on Sophocles. She also studied the survival and reception of ancient drama, an area she pioneered, editing the first Cambridge Companion to include a full section on Reception, of Greek Tragedy. She was the first Chair of the Management Committee of the Cambridge Greek Lexicon Project.

Easterling's protégée and collaborator Edith Hall wrote that Easterling "effected a paradigm shift in ancient theatre studies" by insisting that Greek tragedy did not die at the end of the fifth century BC, but flourished as an art form throughout antiquity. According to Hall, Easterling "transferred the focus of scholarship from traditional, technical study aimed at producing accurate texts from multiple manuscripts, to an aesthetic and sociohistorical appreciation of plays as records of thrilling live performances". Upon her election to the Regius Professorship she was described as a "pluralist" by Oliver Taplin, on account of her capacity to work with multiple critical approaches at once.

Easterling worked to improve and broaden teaching of classical languages and literature. She supported and worked on the curriculum changes introduced in the 1960s and 1970s, and had a long association with the Joint Association of Classical Teachers and with its Greek Summer School at Bryanston School in Dorset, where she lectured on an occasional basis. Her support for classical civilization as a route to studying classics for students from schools where Greek and Latin were not taught was a feature across her career. She was also a patron of the charity Classics for All.

== Personal life and death ==
In 1956 she married John Easterling, a lecturer in classical philosophy who became a fellow of Trinity College and University Draftsman at the Old Schools; he died in 2021. They had one son. She died on 18 August 2026, aged 92.

== Honours ==
Easterling was made an Honorary Fellow of Newnham College in 1987 and of University College London in 1997. She was elected a Fellow of the British Academy in 1998, and in 2013 was made an associé étranger of the Académie des Inscriptions et Belles-Lettres at the Institut de France and an Honorary Member of the Hungarian Academy of Sciences.

She was awarded honorary doctorates by Uppsala University (2000), Athens University, the University of Bristol (1999), Royal Holloway, University of London and the University of Ioannina.

She gave the inaugural Housman Lecture at University College London on 14 June 2005 and was the recipient of two Festschrift volumes, Homer, Tragedy and Beyond (2001) and Sophocles and the Greek Tragic Tradition (2009).

== Publications ==
Easterling was a General Editor of the Cambridge Greek and Latin Classics series from its foundation, and published an edition within this series of Sophocles's Trachiniae in 1982.

=== Books ===
- Sophocles: Trachiniae, edited, Cambridge, 1982 ISBN 0521200873
- Greek Religion and Society, edited with J. V. Muir, 1984
- The Cambridge History of Classical Literature, General editor with E. J. Kenney
- The Cambridge Companion to Greek Tragedy, Editor, 1997
- Greek Scripts: An Illustrated Introduction, edited with Carol Handley, Society for the Promotion of Hellenic Studies, 2001 ISBN 9780902984172
- Greek and Roman Actors: Aspects of an Ancient Profession, edited with Edith Hall, Cambridge, 2002 ISBN 978-0521651400
- Sophocles: Electra and Other Plays, trans. David Raeburn, introduction, Penguin, 2008 ISBN 9780140449785
- Studies in Greek Literature, ed. Felix Budelmann and Eveline Krummen, Cambridge, 2026. Volume 1: Greek Tragedy ISBN 9781009501057 Volume 2: Early Greek Literature, Reception, Ancient and Modern Scholarship ISBN 9781009501187

Her edition of Sophocles's Oedipus at Colonus is to appear posthumously.

=== Selected articles ===
- 'Constructing the Heroic' in Christopher Pelling, ed., Greek Tragedy and the Historian, Oxford, 1997: 21–37
- 'The Infanticide in Euripides' Medea', Yale Classical Studies 25 (1977): 177–191
- 'From Repertoire to Canon' in P. E. Easterling, ed., Cambridge Companion to Greek Tragedy, 1997, pp. 211–227
- 'Narrative on the Greek Tragic Stage' in Douglas Cairns and Ruth Scodel, eds., Defining Greek Narrative, Edinburgh, 2014, pp. 226–240.

Academic offices
Preceded by E. W. Handley	Professor of Greek, University College, London; 1987–1994	Succeeded by Richard Janko
Preceded by E. W. Handley	Regius Professor of Greek, University of Cambridge; 1994–2001	Succeeded by Richard Hunter
