= James Morwood =

British academic (1943–2017)

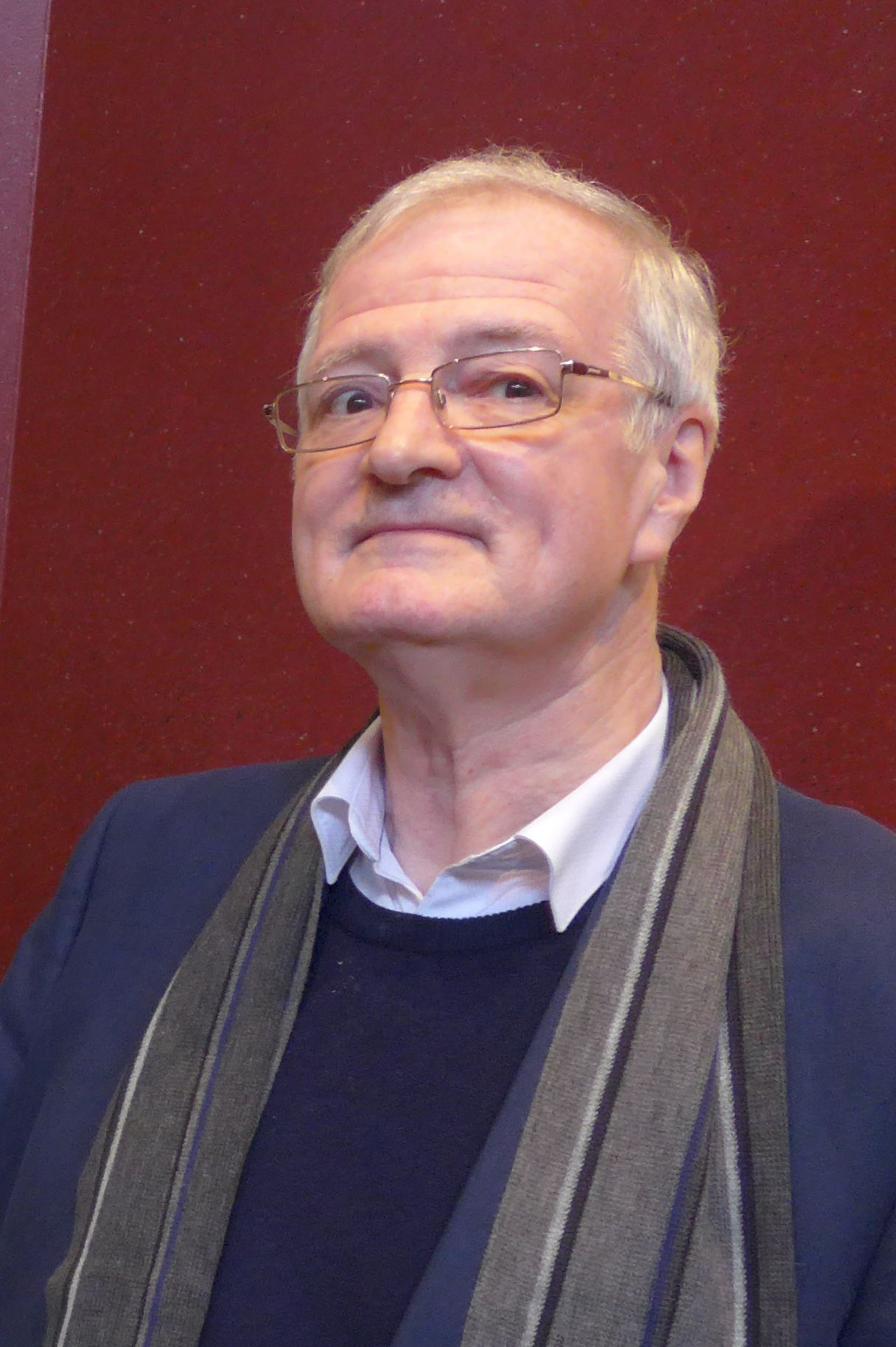
- James Morwood at the Ashmolean Museum in February 2017
- Born: 25 November 1943; Belfast, United Kingdom
- Died: 10 September 2017 (aged 73); Ouranoupoli, Greece
- Occupations: Classicist, author
- Years active: 1966–2017

James Henry Weldon Morwood (25 November 1943 – 10 September 2017) was an English classicist and author. He taught at Harrow School, where he was Head of Classics, and at Oxford University, where he was a Fellow of Wadham College, and also Dean. He wrote almost thirty books, ranging from biography to translations and academic studies of Classical literature.

His best-known work is The Oxford Latin Course (1987–92, with Maurice Balme, new ed, 2012), whose popularity in the USA led to the publication of a specifically American edition in 1996. Morwood is credited with helping to ensure the survival - even flourishing - of Classical education into the twenty-first century, both in the UK and the USA.

== Early life and education ==
James Henry Weldon Morwood was born in 1943 in Belfast, the second son of James and Kathleen Morwood. His father was a doctor from Belfast, his mother a Californian and graduate of UCLA. They met in New York in 1939, married there and then boarded a ship to the UK after war was declared.

Morwood spent his first years in Ulster before his family moved to Oxshott in Surrey after the Second World War. He attended Danes Hill preparatory school, where he studied Greek from the age of 11. He won a scholarship to St John's School, Leatherhead, followed by an Exhibition at Peterhouse, Cambridge where he sat Part I of the Classical Tripos (taught by E.J.Kenney) and Part II of the English Tripos (taught by Anne Barton). He then moved on to Merton College, Oxford to obtain his Diploma of Education.

== Teaching career ==
=== Harrow ===
James Morwood taught Classics and English at Harrow School from 1966 to 1996, and was Head of Classics from 1979. His additional role as school Librarian provided him with some of the material for his first book, The Life and Works of Richard Brinsley Sheridan. Sheridan attended Harrow School from 1762–68, and some of his papers were archived there.

Morwood produced many school and house plays at Harrow, in the process inspiring some notable thespians. He cast Benedict Cumberbatch as Eliza Doolittle in Bernard Shaw's Pygmalion, in which Cumberbatch "acted everyone else off the stage." He also gave the 'green light' to Richard Curtis to direct The Erpingham Camp, a controversial play by Joe Orton, loosely based on The Bacchae by Euripides. Later, Curtis commented that Morwood's support had helped him understand that it was all right to push boundaries and to be funny.

=== Oxford ===
In 1996 Morwood moved to Oxford University as Grocyn Lecturer in charge of the language teaching for the Classics Faculty, retiring from this role in 2003. Also in 1996 he was elected to a Fellowship at Wadham College, where he taught and served as Dean of Degrees, and Steward of Common Room. In 2000 he became Dean of Wadham College, holding the position until 2006. He was appointed editor of the Wadham Gazette in 2003, and became an Emeritus Fellow in 2006. He continued to teach Wadham undergraduates Greek tragedy, Homer and prose composition.

Morwood was appointed president of the London Association of Classical Teachers for 1995–1996, and subsequently president of the Joint Association of Classical Teachers (JACT) for 1999–2001.

=== Greek Summer School ===
Morwood had a long association with the Joint Association of Classical Teachers and with its Greek Summer School, which was launched in London in 1968, continued at Dean Close School, Cheltenham, and is currently held annually at Bryanston School in Dorset. The JACT Summer School has played an important part in the preservation of ancient Greek as a significant subject in the UK. Morwood taught beginners, intermediate and advanced groups at the school regularly since 1970. He served as its Director of Studies, and on seven occasions as its director, starting in 1986 when he took over from the founder, David Raeburn.

He also taught adult courses on Classics and English Literature at the University of Cambridge Institute of Continuing Education at Madingley Hall. He was editor of Ad familiares, the on-line publication of Classics for All.

== Classical literature ==
Morwood's many translations and commentaries on classical texts demonstrate his enthusiasm for both Latin poetry, and Greek tragedy. Robin Mitchell-Boyask has this to say about Morwood's book The Plays of Euripides:

It is rare to find a guide to Greek drama that stems from the author's unabashed ardor for its subject . . . such enthusiasm is certainly not out of place, and it is indeed welcome as it allows Morwood to provide brief introductions to all 19 extant dramas (including the disputed Rhesus)

In his review of Morwood's translation of Medea, Adrial Poole comments on the lines the chorus sing just before Jason's final entrance: "with a little room to breathe, Morwood's lyrics find a quietly effective rhythm of their own:"

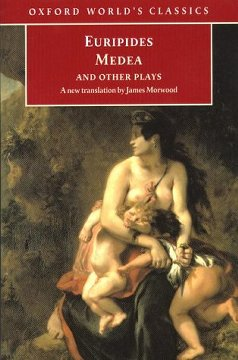
Medea, play by Euripides. translated by James Morwood, with an Introduction by Edith Hall. Oxford World's Classics Euripides series 1996, new edition 2016

O love of women with its many troubles,
how vast a history of catastrophe
have you brought upon men!

== Oxford World's Classics Euripides series ==
The Medea was part of a major project undertaken with Oxford University Press to provide new translations of all 19 of Euripides' extant plays, including the disputed Rhesus. This collection was published in five volumes as the Oxford World's Classics Euripides series (republished in a revised edition in 2016). Morwood translated and provided notes for three volumes in the series: Medea and other plays, Bacchae and other plays, and The Trojan Women and other plays. He also provided notes for the other two volumes, Orestes and Other Plays, and Heracles and Other Plays which were translated by Robin Waterfield. Introductions to all five volumes were provided by the classicist Edith Hall.

The Oxford translations are in prose rather than verse, and Otto Steinmayer observes that "Morwood was quite plainly not attempting to translate Euripides in a striking, fanciful, poetic way. . . these versions are not for the stage." Nevertheless, the availability of a fresh translation of Rhesus did lead to at least one new dramatisation of that play, presented at the Memorial University of Newfoundland, under the direction of George Adam Kovacs in 2001. In her review, Elizabeth Scharffenberger has this to say about the status of this controversial play:

Kovacs, I learned at the ACA conference, is convinced that Euripides was the author of Rhesus. Having seen the tragedy, I appreciate his arguments but am not entirely convinced by them, since the play has as many differences from as similarities to extant Euripidean works. But even if we do not accept the tragedy as Euripidean, we should not do so on the grounds that it is a "bad" play. Rhesus is not "bad;" rather, I think, it does not conform to our now-cherished notions concerning the development of plot and character in Greek tragedy.

In 2007 Morwood revisited Euripides with a new scholarly edition of Suppliant Women. In her review, Aurelie Wach of Université Lille contrasts this work with the rival edition from Christopher Collard (1975) which Morwood himself describes as "magnificent" in his introduction:

Morwood's work does not compete with Collard's: not only does he refer to recent studies which have made discussion about the play still richer over the last thirty years, but, more importantly, he has neither the same aim, nor does he have the same audience in mind. His book is a lot more accessible, and less technical, but also less comprehensive in its approach. . . .

The many qualities of this volume will enable numerous readers to enjoy the discovery of this magnificent play which, as James Morwood reminds us, has too long been considered as a minor work by Euripides, a play of political propaganda. Each part of the book, the Introduction, Translation and Commentary, aims to facilitate reading and stimulate interest, without drowning the reader in technical details concerning Euripides' language or the editing of his work.

== The Oxford Latin Course ==
James Morwood was co-author with Maurice Balme (1925–2012) of The Oxford Latin Course, published in three Parts from 1987 to 1992. This course is targeted at Secondary Schools in the UK, and uses the "reading (inductive) method" in its approach to teaching the language. It was soon adopted in America, among others by Professor Jeffrey Wills, University of Wisconsin-Madison, who characterised the "readings" by their "reuse of basic vocabulary and their length – both of which fulfill tenets of the inductive approach."

The Oxford Latin Course is split into three parts, the first two of which focus on a Latin narrative detailing the life of the poet Quintus Horatius Flaccus [ Horace ]. The story is based closely on historical sources, which help to develop an understanding of the times of Cicero and Augustus.

The First Part is set in the late Republic, and introduces Quintus, the son of a freedman, who studies under the local schoolmaster, and learns the story of Aeneas and the Trojan War. Quintus travels to Rome, where he continues his studies, and interacts with various levels of society, from an innkeeper to the son of a lawyer, and is there at the time of Caesar's assassination.

The Second Part moves to Athens where Quintus completes his education at The Academy, and travels to Mycenae, Olympia, and Delphi. He joins the army of Brutus, only to be defeated after a brief campaign at the Battle of Philippi, after which he returns to Italy. Here he starts writing poetry while Mark Antony and Octavian fight for political dominance. He becomes a good friend of Octavian, who soon emerges as the first Roman Emperor Augustus.

The Third Part is an extensive reader with passages of both poetry and prose from Cicero, Catullus, Caesar, Virgil, Ovid, Livy, and Horace.

Professor Wills comments: The only perfect textbook is an untried textbook, but after a year of using all three parts in different courses at the University of Wisconsin-Madison, I can say we were generally very satisfied. We wanted far more readings than most Latin grammars supply and in this we were not disappointed. In the course of two semesters (in which we covered most of the first two books), students read over 2000 lines of Latin. It is true that almost all of this was written by Balme and Morwood, but after the opening chapters the stories have a high level of Latinity (is this why the authors thank Prof. E.J. Kenney and Dr. Jonathan Powell?) and held student interest.

Following the early adoption of the original course at Wisconsin-Madison, and schools in St Louis, a specifically American Edition was published in 1996. A new College Edition adapted for an undergraduate readership and abbreviated so that it can be taught within two semesters (or a year) was published in 2012.

== Last works ==
After publishing nearly 30 books, including The Pocket Oxford Latin Dictionary, its successor, A Dictionary of Latin Words and Phrases, The Oxford Grammar of Classical Greek, and Our Greek and Latin Roots, Morwood had the opportunity towards the end of his life of working on two more scholarly editions of Greek and Latin texts with outstanding collaborators. The first of these, published in 2017, was a translation and commentary on Iphigenia at Aulis with Christopher Collard, "required reading for anyone interested in this Greek tragedy." This work completed a project to produce new editions of all the extant plays of Euripides started by Collard 40 years ago.

Morwood's final collaboration was with Stephen Heyworth, his colleague at Wadham College, Oxford, with whom he had worked on A Commentary on Propertius, Book 3 six years previously. Their new book, A Commentary on Vergil Aeneid 3 (also 2017) was seen as a curious choice by some reviewers, because of the perceived "dullness" of Book 3 - there aren't enough "Odyssean heroics". Heyworth and Morwood reject this view as outdated, preferring to concentrate on Vergil's poetics and influences, with James Taylor noting the usefulness of its "panoply of intertexts."

== Controversy ==
Morwood was no ivory tower classicist, and he enjoyed a good fight. When the journalist Harry Mount wrote in The Spectator (2004) about the supposed demise of Classics in UK schools, Morwood wrote a powerful riposte, which The Spectator published in full under the title The pluperfect is doing nicely.

Morwood was particularly incensed by Mount's dismissal of the Cambridge Latin Course, saying: "His denunciation of the Cambridge Latin Course as 'the evil Latin-for-idiots school textbooks' is blind to the fact that it was this very course which rescued Latin from an apparently terminal decline in the 1960s."

Mount didn't budge. The final chapter of his book Carpe Diem, published two years later in 2006, is entitled "Dumbing up, or death to the Cambridge Latin Course".

== Death ==
James Morwood died suddenly while swimming in the sea off northern Greece on 10 September 2017. At the inquest in Oxford, the Coroner accepted the diagnosis of the Oxford pathologist that Morwood had died of 'dry drowning'. "It is a form of drowning where the water hits his larynx and sends shockwaves to his heart." His funeral, held at Oxford on 13 October, celebrated the warmth of his personality, his love of fun, and his role as an inspirational teacher, motifs which were reiterated in several obituaries. Ed Gorman in The Times quoted the comedy screenwriter Richard Curtis, who edited The Harrovian with Morwood while at Harrow, saying, 'It's no exaggeration to say that everything I do now started with James.'

Christopher Tyerman in The Guardian described Morwood as "A cultural omnivore, at all levels he impressed pupils with his tastes in drama, music (especially opera), film, freedom of ideas and principled mischief, inspiring as much by example as precept."

Stephen Heyworth in The Daily Telegraph wrote that working with James (on academic studies of Propertius and Vergil) was one of the best things he had done, 'I learnt so much, not least about getting on with it and bringing work to completion . . . but above all I had enormous fun.'

On Sunday 4 February 2018, Wadham College hosted a memorial service for James Morwood in the Sheldonian Theatre, Oxford, attended by 400 people. A number of friends, colleagues and former students, including Richard Curtis, paid tribute to him.

Perhaps the last word can be left to Edmund Stewart, who attended the Greek Summer School at Bryanston twenty years ago: 'Morwood said to me, "When I die, Classics will long since have ceased to be taught in this country". The opposite has been the case, an outcome that has been significantly enabled by his own efforts.'

== Books published ==
- Cupid and Psyche, An adaptation from the Golden Ass of Apuleius (with Maurice Balme, Oxford University Press, 1976) ISBN 0-19-912047-1
- The Life and Works of Richard Brinsley Sheridan (Scottish Academic Press, 1985) ISBN 0-70-730428-8
- The Oxford Latin Course (with Maurice Balme, Oxford University Press, 1987–92, second edition 1996) ISBN 0-19-912226-1
- Our Greek and Latin Roots (with Mark Warman, Cambridge University Press, 1990, second edition 2008) ISBN 9780521699990
- The Pocket Oxford Latin Dictionary (Oxford University Press, 1994, revised edition 2005); (also formatted as The Oxford Latin Mini Dictionary, and retitled as The Oxford Latin Desk Dictionary) ISBN 0-19-860283-9
- Sheridan Studies (co-edited with David Crane, chapter by Morwood included, Cambridge University Press, 1995) ISBN 0-52-146466-8
- A Dictionary of Latin Words and Phrases (Oxford University Press, 1998) ISBN 0-19-860109-3
- Medea and other plays by Euripides, translation and notes by Morwood, introduction by Edith Hall (Oxford University Press, 1998) ISBN 0-19-282442-2
- Bacchae and other plays by Euripides, translation and notes by Morwood, introduction by Edith Hall (Oxford University Press, 2000) ISBN 9780199540525
- The Trojan Women and other plays by Euripides, translation and notes by Morwood, introduction by Edith Hall (Oxford University Press, 2001) ISBN 0-19-953881-6
- A Latin Grammar (Oxford University Press, 1999) ISBN 0-19-860199-9
- Oxford Grammar of Classical Greek (Oxford University Press, 2001) ISBN 0-19-860456-4
- The Plays of Euripides (Duckworth Overlook, 2002, 2nd edition Bloomsbury Publishing, 2016) ISBN 9781474233613
- A Greek Anthology (with Carol Handley and John Taylor, Cambridge University Press, 2002) ISBN 0-52-100026-2
- The Pocket Oxford Dictionary of Classical Greek (with John Taylor, Oxford University Press, 2002) ISBN 9780198605126
- On the Margin (with Maurice Balme, Oxford University Press, 2003) ISBN 9780199124008
- The Teaching of Classics edited Morwood with contributions (Cambridge University Press, 2003) ISBN 9780521527637
- Suppliant Women by Euripides, translation and notes by Morwood (Oxbow Books, 2007) ISBN 9780856687792
- Writing Latin (with Richard Ashdowne, Duckworth Overlook, 2007) ISBN 9781853997013
- Virgil, a poet in Augustan Rome (Cambridge University Press, 2008) ISBN 9780521689441
- The Tragedies of Sophocles (Bristol Phoenix Press, 2008) ISBN 9781904675716
- Key to Advanced Latin (with Katharine Radice and Stephen Anderson, Duckworth Overlook, 2009) ISBN 9781853997303
- A Commentary on Propertius, Book 3 (with Stephen Heyworth Oxford University Press, 2011) ISBN 9780199571482
- The Oxford Latin Course College Edition (with Maurice Balme, Oxford University Press, 2012) ISBN 9780199862962
- Hadrian (Ancients in Action) (Bloomsbury Publishing, 2013) ISBN 9781849668866
- A Little Greek Reader (with Stephen Anderson, Oxford University Press, 2014) ISBN 9780199311729
- Athenaze by Maurice Balme and Gilbert Lawall, revised Morwood, (third edition, Oxford University Press, 2014) ISBN 9780190607661
- Iphigenia at Aulis (with Christopher Collard, Liverpool University Press, 2017) ISBN 978-1-911226-46-8 (Hardback), ISBN 978-1-911226-47-5 (Paperback)
- A Commentary on Vergil Aeneid 3 (with Stephen Heyworth, Oxford University Press, 2017) ISBN 978-0-19-872781-1 (Hardback), ISBN 978-0-19-872782-8 (Paperback)
