= Peter J. Parsons =

British classicist and papyrologist (1936–2022)

Professor Peter J. Parsons FBA

Regius Professor of Greek University of Oxford
- In office 1989–2003
- Preceded by: Sir Hugh Lloyd-Jones
- Succeeded by: Christopher Pelling

Personal details
- Born: Peter John Parsons; 24 September 1936 Surbiton, Surrey, England
- Died: 16 November 2022 (aged 86) Oxford, England
- Citizenship: United Kingdom
- Spouse: Barbara Macleod (m. 2006; died 2006)
- Awards: Fellow of the British Academy (1977)

Peter John Parsons, FBA (24 September 1936 – 16 November 2022) was a British classicist and academic specialising in papyrology. He was Regius Professor of Greek at the University of Oxford from 1989 to 2003.

== Early life and education ==
Parsons was born on 24 September 1936 in Surbiton, Surrey, England, to Robert John Parsons and Ethel Ada (née Frary). He was educated at Raynes Park County Grammar School, an all-boys grammar school in Wimbledon, London. He sat the Oxford entrance examination in December 1953, and his success meant he was the first in his family to attend university. From 1954 to 1958, he studied classics at Christ Church, Oxford, where his tutors included John Gould, David Malcolm Lewis and J. Gwyn Griffiths. He graduated with a double first Bachelor of Arts (BA) degree in 1958: as per tradition, his BA was promoted to a Master of Arts (MA Oxon) degree in 1961.

== Academic career ==
Having completed his undergraduate degree, Parsons was encouraged by E. R. Dodds to undertake research in either papyrology or Greek religion; he chose the former. Between 1958 and 1960, he maintained Christ Church, Oxford as his base, while also spending time at the University of Michigan learning documentary papyrology under Herbert Youtie. In 1960, he was appointed to the newly created post of lecturer in papyrology at the University of Oxford. His position at Christ Church was formalised in 1964 when he was made a research student (i.e. a research fellow, "student" being the name of fellows at the college). He worked on the Oxyrhynchus Papyri with John Rea between 1965 and 1989.

In 1989, he was appointed Regius Professor of Greek, one of Oxford's most senior professorships, in succession to Sir Hugh Lloyd-Jones. Parsons supported the Joint Association of Classical Teachers Greek summer school at Bryanston in Dorset, acting as a tutor on a number of occasions, and he was also Director of the Oxyrhynchus Papyri Project. He stepped down as Regius Professor in 2003 and was succeeded by Christopher Pelling.

Parsons had wide ranging interests within the field of classical studies, including ancient Greek language, Greek poetry, Latin poetry, history of the Roman Empire, and Roman Egypt. His studies of papyrology were not restricted to Greek language fragments but also to Latin ones.

== Personal life and death ==
In 2006, Parsons married Barbara Macleod (née Montagna); she had had a diagnosis of cancer before they married and she died the same year. Barbara was the widow of Colin William MacLeod (1943–1981), a classical scholar at Christ Church, Oxford.

On 16 November 2022, Parsons died at the John Radcliffe Hospital, Oxford, at the age of 86. His funeral was held at Christ Church Cathedral, Oxford, on 2 December 2022.

== Honours ==
In 1977, Parsons was elected a Fellow of the British Academy (FBA). In 2007, he was awarded the John D. Criticos Prize by the London Hellenic Society for his book City of the Sharp-Nosed-Fish: Greek Lives in Roman Egypt. In 2019, Parsons was awarded the Kenyon Medal by the British Academy.

A conference was held in Oxford in September 2006 to celebrate his 70th birthday. An associated Festschrift was published in 2011, titled Culture in pieces: essays on ancient texts in honour of Peter Parsons, and edited by Dirk Obbink and Richard Rutherford.

== Selected works ==
- Barns, J. W. B.; Parsons, P. J.; Rea, John; Turner, E. G. (1966). The Oxyrhynchus Papyri. Part XXXI. London: Egypt Exploration Society.
- Lloyd-Jones, Hugh; Parsons, Peter, eds. (1983). Supplementum Hellenisticum. Berolini: De Gruyter. ISBN 978-3110081718.
- Parsons, Peter (2007). City of the sharp-nosed fish: Greek lives in Roman Egypt. London: Weidenfeld & Nicolson. ISBN 978-0297645887.
- Bowman, A. K.; Coles, R. A.; Gonis, N.; Obbink, D. D.; Parsons, P. J., eds. (2007). Oxyrhynchus: a city and its texts. London: Egypt Exploration Society. ISBN 978-0856981777.
- Parsons, Peter John; Maehler, Herwig; Maltomini, Francesca, eds. (2014). The Vienna Epigrams Papyrus (G 40611). Berlin: De Gruyter. ISBN 978-3110354522.

Academic offices
Preceded by Hugh Lloyd-Jones	Regius Professor of Greek; University of Oxford; 1989 to 2003	Succeeded by Christopher Pelling
