= Eric Gardner Turner =

British papyrologist and classicist

Professor Sir Eric Gardner Turner CBE
- Portrait by Walter Stoneman, 1956
- Born: 26 February 1911; Broomhill, Sheffield, South Yorkshire, England
- Died: 20 April 1983 (aged 72)
- Occupation: Classical scholar

Academic background
- Education: King Edward VII School; Magdalen College, Oxford

Academic work
- Discipline: Classics
- Sub-discipline: Greek papyrology
- Institutions: University of Aberdeen; University College, London

Sir Eric Gardner Turner CBE (26 February 1911 – 20 April 1983) was an English papyrologist and classicist.

Turner was born in Broomhill, Sheffield. He was educated at King Edward VII School and Magdalen College, Oxford, and taught classics at the University of Aberdeen from 1936 to 1948, although from 1941 to 1945 he served in the Naval Intelligence Division at Bletchley Park. In 1948 he became first Reader in Papyrology at University College, London, and was promoted to professor in 1950. He retired in 1978.

He was appointed a Commander of the Order of the British Empire (CBE) in 1975 and was knighted in 1981. He was an elected member of the American Philosophical Society.

== Works ==
- Catalogue of Greek and Latin papyri and ostraca in the possession of the University of Aberdeen. University Press, Aberdeen, 1939.
- Bernard Pyne Grenfell, Arthur Surridge Hunt, Eric Gardner Turner (eds.): The Hibeh papyri. Egypt Exploration Fund, London, 1906.
- Athenian books in the fifth and fourth centuries B.C. An inaugural lecture delivered at University College London, 22 May 1951. H. K. Lewis & Co. Ltd., London, 1952.
- Greek Papyri. An Introduction. Oxford University Press, Oxford 1968; first paperback edition 1980, ISBN 0-19-814841-0. Italian edition: Rome 1984.
- New fragments of the Misoumenos of Menander. The University of London, Institute of Classical Studies, London 1965 (Bulletin of the Institute of Classical Studies, Supplement 17).
- Ménandre. Sept exposés suivis de discussions, Vandoeuvres-Genève 1969. Entretiens préparés et présidés par Eric G. Turner. Foundation Hardt pours l'Etude de l'Antiquité Classique, Vandoeuvres, 1970 (Entretien sur l'Antiquité Classique, t. 16).
- Greek manuscripts of the ancient world. Clarendon Press, Oxford, 1971, ISBN 0-19-814284-6. The second edition revised and enlarged. Edited by Peter J. Parsons. The University of London, Institute of Classical Studies, 1987 (Bulletin of the Institute of Classical Studies, 46), ISBN 0-900587-48-2.
- The Papyrologist at Work. Durham, NC, Duke University, 1973.
- with T. S. Pattie: The written word on papyrus. An exhibition held in The British Museum, 30 July – 27 October 1974. Published for the British Library Board by British Museum Publications Limited. London, British Library, 1974, ISBN 0-7141-0488-4.
- The Typology of the Early Codex. Philadelphia 1977.
- Menander (of Athens.), Eric Gardner Turner: The lost beginning of Menander, Misoumenos. Volume 63 of Proceedings, British Academy. Oxford University Press, 1978
