= L. P. E. Parker =

British classical scholar (1933–2026)

- Born: Laetitia Parvin Erna Parker; 1933
- Died: 1 April 2026 (aged 93); Boars Hill, Oxfordshire, England
- Occupation: Classical scholar

Academic background
- Education: University of Cambridge (MA); University of London (PhD)
- Thesis: Greek lyric metre: the incidence of word-end (1962)
- Doctoral advisor: A. M. Dale

Academic work
- Discipline: Classics
- Sub-discipline: Ancient Greek literature
- Institutions: Newcastle University; St Hugh's College, Oxford
- Notable works: The Songs of Aristophanes (1997)

Laetitia Parvin Erna Edwards (1933 – 1 April 2026), published under her maiden name as L. P. E. Parker, was a British classical scholar, known especially for her work on the metres of ancient Greek poetry.

== Biography ==
Parker was born in England in 1933. She studied Classics at the University of Cambridge, and then held a graduate studentship at Cambridge while studying for her doctorate at the University of London under the supervision of A. M. Dale. She obtained her doctorate in 1962, with a thesis on "Greek lyric metre: the incidence of word-end".

She was appointed an assistant lecturer at Westfield College, London in 1957, before becoming a lecturer at King's College, Newcastle in 1960. In 1967, she moved to Oxford upon marrying David Edwards, a fellow in mathematics at Lincoln College, Oxford. At Oxford, she initially worked as a college lecturer at Wadham, St John's, Somerville and St Hugh's colleges, until she was appointed Fellow and Tutor in Classics at St Hugh's in 1970, in succession to Dorothea Gray. At St Hugh's, she also served as Senior Tutor, Dean of Degrees, and Vice Principal. In 1997, she published her book The Songs of Aristophanes, which provides a full metrical analysis of the lyric parts of the comedies of Aristophanes, together with a full discussion of Aristophanes' use of lyric metre.

She retired from her position at St Hugh's in 1999. In retirement, she continued her research, producing major scholarly commentaries on Euripides' Alcestis and Iphigenia in Tauris. She died at Boars Hill, near Oxford, on 1 April 2026, aged 93.

== Selected publications ==
=== Monograph ===
- Parker, L. P. E. (1997). The Songs of Aristophanes. Oxford University Press. ISBN 9780198149446.

=== Editions of ancient texts ===
- Parker, L. P. E. (2007). Euripides: Alcestis. Oxford University Press. ISBN 9780199254675.
- Parker, L. P. E. (2016). Euripides: Iphigenia in Tauris. Oxford University Press. ISBN 9780199550104.
