= Eric Handley =

British classical scholar

- Born: 12 November 1926
- Died: 17 January 2013 (aged 86)
- Spouse: Carol Handley

Academic background
- Education: Trinity College, Cambridge

Academic work
- Discipline: Classics
- Sub-discipline: Ancient Greek; Ancient Greek comedy; Menander
- Institutions: University of Cambridge; University College London

Eric Walter Handley, CBE (12 November 1926 – 17 January 2013) was a British classical scholar, noted for his work on the Greek new comic poet Menander. He was Director of the Institute of Classical Studies, University of London from 1967 to 1984, Professor of Greek at University College London from 1968 to 1984, and Regius Professor of Greek at the University of Cambridge from 1984 to 1994. Handley supported the JACT Greek summer school at Bryanston in Dorset, acting as a tutor on a number of occasions, and lecturing on Menander.

== Early life ==
Handley was born on 12 November 1926. He grew up in Birmingham. He was educated at King Edward's School, Birmingham, having won a scholarship to the private boys school, and then at Trinity College, Cambridge, where he matriculated at the age of sixteen.

== Personal life ==
Handley married Carol Taylor on 31 July 1952. She was headmistress of Camden School for Girls (1971–85) and President of the Classical Association (1996–7).

== Honours ==
In the 1983 New Year Honours, Handley was appointed a Commander of the Order of the British Empire (CBE) in recognition of his work as Professor of Greek at University College, London. He was a fellow of the Norwegian Academy of Science and Letters from 1996.

Academic offices
Preceded by T. B. L. Webster	Professor of Greek, University College, London; 1968 - 1984	Succeeded by P. E. Easterling
Preceded by Geoffrey Kirk	Regius Professor of Greek, University of Cambridge; 1984 to 1994	Succeeded by P. E. Easterling
