= Professor of Greek (University College London) =

The Professorship in Greek was one of the original professorships of University College London (UCL) in 1828. The position was established at the same time as the Professorship in Latin. The inaugural lecture of the first incumbent was delivered on November 1, 1830. The teaching of classical Greek (and Latin) at the new University of London "challenged both the monopoly and the style of Oxbridge classics". Since the Second World War the chair has been occupied by a series of renowned scholars including T. B. L. Webster (who founded the Institute of Classical Studies), Eric Handley, P. E. Easterling, Richard Janko, and Chris Carey. P. E. Easterling is the only woman to have held the position.

== List of Holders ==
The following have held the chair of Greek:

- George Long, 1828–1831
- Henry Malden, 1831–1876
- William Wayte, 1876–1879
- Alfred Goodwin, 1879–1892 (also Professor of Latin, 1876–1879 and 1889–1892)
- William Wyse, 1892–1894
- John Arthur Platt, 1894–1925
- Marriott T. Smiley, 1925–1948
- T. B. L. Webster, 1948–1968
- Eric Handley, 1968–1984
- P. E. Easterling, 1987–1994
- Richard Janko, 1995–2002
- Chris Carey, 2003–2014
- Phiroze Vasunia, 2014–present

== Sources ==
- H. Hale Bellot, University College, London, 1826-1926, London, 1929.
- George Long, "Observations on the Study of the Latin and Greek Languages" (Inaugural Lecture), 1830.
- P. G. Naiditch, A. E. Housman at University College, London: the election of 1892, Leiden, 1988.
- Christopher Stray, Classics Transformed: Schools, Universities, and Society in England, 1830-1960. Oxford, 1998.
- University of London Calendar
