= Classics for All =

UK-based charity

Classics For All is a UK-based charity that aims to raise funds to support the study of Latin, Ancient History, Classical Civilization and Ancient Greek in state schools.

== Charitable objectives ==
The objectives of the charity are 'to advance education in the languages history and culture of both ancient Greece and Rome and the Classical World generally'.

== Activities ==
Classics For All was established in 2011. The charity financially supports re-training History, English, and Modern Foreign Language teachers in Latin, Classical Civilisation and Greek. It gives grants to purchase teaching provisions, funds events promoting classics, and helps schools to add classical subjects to the curriculum.

== Funds ==
The charity began the dissemination of funds in 2011, and has awarded more than £920,000 in grants to 700 schools. For the financial year ending 31 December 2017, the charity earned £451.276 and spent £504.392. The charity has increased in scope, funding accrual and grant-giving since 2015. In 2015 it awarded £147,000 in grants. By 2017 this had risen to £245,000. The number of teachers trained similarly rose from 106 in 2015 to 350 in 2017.

The charity relies largely on donations from individuals, organisations or charities. In 2017 it was awarded a £90,000 grant from the A. G. Leventis Foundation and £60,000 from The Polonsky Foundation, both to be paid over three years. In 2017 it received donations from 343 individuals, charities or organisations, including 107 made anonymously.

== Ad Familiares ==
Ad Familiares is the online journal of Classics for All, with articles ranging from Killing Caesar to In Bed with the Ancient Greeks. It was edited by James Morwood, Emeritus Fellow of Wadham College, Oxford from 2016-2017, a role taken on by John Godwin, former Head of Classics, Shrewsbury School, from 2018 onwards.

The title is derived from Cicero, whose Epistulae ad Familiares (Letters to Friends) is often abbreviated to Ad Familiares.

== Constitution ==
The charity currently has 12 trustees and 47 volunteers. Trustees include Geoffrey John de Jager and Sir Rupert Jackson. It has twenty honorary patrons, including some of the most visible and senior classicists in the discipline such as Dame Mary Beard and Bettany Hughes, and authors, playwrights, actors and politicians such as Dame Joanna Lumley, Ian Hislop, Sir Tom Stoppard and Michael Fallon.
