= Chris Carey =

British classical scholar

Chris Carey FBA
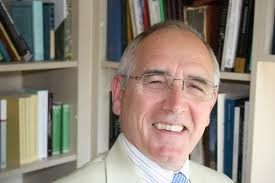
- Chris Carey
- Born: 14 September 1950 (age 76)

Academic background
- Education: Jesus College, Cambridge
- Thesis: A Commentary on Five Odes of Pindar: Pythian 2, Pythian 9, Nemean 1, Nemean 7, Isthmian 8 (1976)
- Doctoral advisors: P. E. Easterling, John Killen, Denys Page

Academic work
- Discipline: Classics
- Sub-discipline: Ancient Greek literature
- Institutions: University of St Andrews; Royal Holloway; University College London

Christopher Carey FBA (born 14 September 1950) is a British classical scholar, specialising in ancient Greek literature. He served as Professor of Greek at University College London from 2003 until his retirement in 2016.

== Biography ==
Carey was born on 14 September 1950. He is from Liverpool, and was educated at Alsop High School. He studied at Jesus College, Cambridge, obtaining his BA in 1972 and PhD in 1976. His doctoral thesis, titled "A Commentary on Five Odes of Pindar: Pythian 2, Pythian 9, Nemean 1, Nemean 7, Isthmian 8", was supervised by P. E. Easterling, John Killen and Denys Page. From 1974 to 1977 he was a research fellow at Jesus College.

In 1977 Carey moved to the University of St Andrews, where he taught until 1991. He held a visiting professorship at University of Minnesota in 1987–1988, and while there also taught at Carleton College. In 1991 he was elected Professor of Classics at Royal Holloway, University of London. He then moved to University College London to take up the Chair of Greek there in 2003. He retired in 2016, becoming Emeritus Professor of Greek.

He was elected a Fellow of the British Academy in 2012.

== Scholarship ==
Carey's doctoral thesis was on Pindar. Over the years he has also published on lyric poetry, Homer and Athenian law. He edited the Oxford Classical Text of the speeches of the Athenian orator Lysias.

== Selected works ==
- Carey, Christopher (1981). A Commentary on Five Odes of Pindar: Pythian 2, Pythian 9, Nemean 1, Nemean 7, Isthmian 8. New York: Arno Press. ISBN 9780405140327.
- Carey, Christopher; Reid, R. A. (1985). Demosthenes: Selected Private Speeches. Cambridge: Cambridge University Press. ISBN 9780521283731.
- Carey, Christopher (1989). Lysias: Selected Speeches. Cambridge: Cambridge University Press. ISBN 9780521269889.
- Carey, Christopher (1992). Apollodoros: Against Neaira. Warminster: Aris and Phillips. ISBN 9780856685262.
- Carey, Christopher (2007). Lysiae orationes cum fragmentis. Oxford: Oxford University Press. ISBN 9780198140726.
- Swift, Laura; Carey, Chris, eds. (2016). Iambus and Elegy: new approaches. Oxford; New York: Oxford University Press. ISBN 978-0199689743.
- Carey, Christopher (2022). Great Battles: Thermopylae. Oxford: Oxford University Press. ISBN 9780198754114.
- Carey, Christopher (2026). Herodotus: Histories, Book VII. Cambridge: Cambridge University Press. ISBN 9780521479462.
