= Christopher Rowe (classicist) =

British classicist (1944–2025)

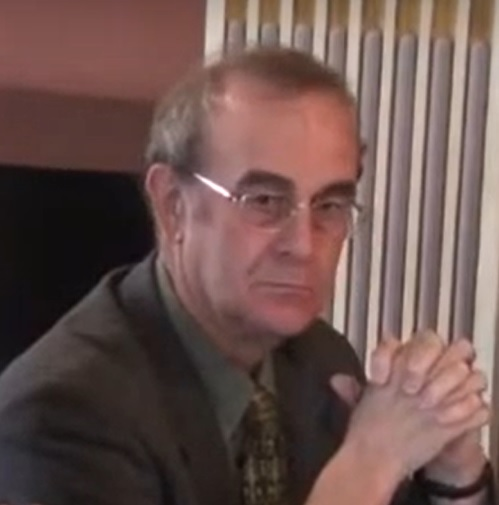
Rowe in 2012

Christopher James Rowe OBE (17 March 1944 – 24 July 2025) was a British classical scholar, known for his work on Ancient Greek philosophy. He held academic positions at the University of Bristol and Durham University.

== Life and career ==
Rowe was born in March, Cambridgeshire on 17 March 1944, the son of Daniel Francis and Edith Mary (née Ashford). From Trinity College, Cambridge he obtained a BA, then an MA and, in 1969, his PhD. His doctoral thesis, written under the direction of John Easterling, was published as The Eudemian and Nicomachean Ethics: a study in the development of Aristotle’s thought (1971).

Rowe began his career at the University of Bristol, England in 1968 as an assistant lecturer, rising to become professor of ancient philosophy and Greek (1989–1991) then Henry Overton Wills Professor of Greek (1991–1995). He joined Durham University in 1996 as Professor of Greek and served as Head of Department 2004–2008. He retired in 2009, becoming an Emeritus Professor.

He served as President of the Classical Association, and was appointed OBE in 2009 for "services to scholarship".

He delivered the Stephen MacKenna lecture at Dublin University in 2009. In years prior he had also been invited to talk about mythology in primary schools.

In 2019, Rowe was awarded a Leverhulme Emeritus Fellowship to complete his Oxford Classical Text of Aristotle's Eudemian Ethics, which was then published in September 2023. A workshop, "On Rowe's Eudemian Ethics: A Workshop on Philosophical and Textual Creativity", was held at Durham University on 25–26 January 2024, in celebration of this "monumental publication".

Rowe died on 24 July 2025, at the age of 81.

== Thought on Plato ==
Rowe translated into English and gave an innovative interpretation of Aristotle's Nicomachean Ethics and Plato's dialogues Theaetetus and Sophist.

Rowe's work includes consideration of the political ideals of Plato's Republic in relation to the details of political practice described in the Statesman and the Laws. In the volume Plato and the Art of Philosophical Writing, Rowe argued that "Plato remains throughout essentially a Socratic".

== Selected publications ==
- The Eudemian and Nicomachean Ethics: a study in the development of Aristotle’s thought. Cambridge University Press, 1971. ISBN 9781913701093.
- Essential Hesiod (Greek text with introduction and notes). Bristol Classical Press, 1978. ISBN 9780906515150.
- Plato: Phaedrus (Greek text with introduction, translation and commentary). Aris and Phillips, 1986. ISBN 9780856683145.
- Plato: Phaedo (Greek text with introduction and commentary). Cambridge University Press, 1993. ISBN 9780521313186.
- Plato: Statesman (Greek text with introduction, translation and commentary). Aris and Phillips, 1995. ISBN 9780856686139.
- Plato: Symposium (Greek text with introduction, translation and commentary). Aris and Phillips, 1998. ISBN 9780856686153.
- with Sarah Broadie. Aristotle: Nicomachean Ethics (translation). Oxford University Press, 2002. ISBN 9780198752714.
- Plato. Harvester, 1984. Second edition, Bristol Classical Press, 2003. ISBN 9781853996627.
- Plato: Phaedrus. Penguin, 2005. ISBN 9780140449747.
- with Terry Penner. Plato's Lysis. Cambridge University Press, 2005 ISBN 9780521791304.
- Plato and the Art of Philosophical Writing. Cambridge University Press, 2007. ISBN 9780521859325.
- The Last Days of Socrates (translated with introduction and notes). Penguin, 2010. ISBN 9780140455496.
- Plato, Republic (new translation, with introduction and notes). Penguin, 2012. ISBN 9780141442433.
- with George Boys-Stones. The Circle of Socrates: Readings in the First-Generation Socratics (edited and translated). Hackett Publishing, 2013. ISBN 9781603849364.
- Plato, Theaetetus and Sophist (new translation, with introduction and notes) Cambridge University Press, 2015. ISBN 9781107014831.
- Aristotelis Ethica Eudemia (Oxford Classical Text). Oxford University Press, 2023. ISBN 9780198838326.
- Aristotelica: Studies on the Text of Aristotle’s Eudemian Ethics. Oxford University Press, 2023. ISBN 9780192873552.
