= Joint Association of Classical Teachers =

British academic organisation

The Joint Association of Classical Teachers (JACT) was a UK organisation for the encouragement of the teaching of Classics in schools and universities. It was merged into the Classical Association with effect from 2 January 2015. The JACT Summer Schools Trust (JSST) continues to run the four JACT summer schools.

== Purpose ==
To quote the JACT website, "The Association was founded in 1963 to improve and maintain the quality of the teaching of classics, and for this purpose to provide means by which teachers of classics may help one another and enabling them to reinterpret the traditional discipline in terms appropriate to the present day."

== Schemes ==
To this end, they organize a number of well-supported events, in particular the annual JACT Ancient Greek summer school, which takes place for a fortnight at Bryanston School, Dorset.

They also hold the annual Jowett-Sendelar Classics Essay competition, for students around the UK, which gives cash prizes to the winners.

== See also ==
- Association for the Reform of Latin Teaching
