= Ure =

Ure or URE may refer to:

== People ==
- Alan Ure (1892–1970), English football manager
- Alexander Ure, 1st Baron Strathclyde (1853–1928), Scottish politician and judge
- Andrew Ure (1778–1857), Scottish doctor, scholar and chemist
- Annie Ure (1893–1976), English archaeologist and curator of Ure Museum of Greek Archaeology
- David Ure (1749–1798), Scottish geologist
- David A. Ure (1910–1953), Canadian politician
- Gudrun Ure (1926–2024), Scottish actress
- Guillermo Alberto O'Donnell Ure (1936–2011), Argentine academic
- Ian Ure (born 1939), Scottish footballer
- Jean Ure (born 1943), English children's author
- Joan Ure, pen name of Elizabeth Clark (1918–1978), English-Scottish poet and playwright
- Sir John Ure (diplomat) (born 1931), British diplomat (retired) and writer
- Mario Ernesto O'Donnell Ure (born 1941), Argentine historian and physician
- Mary Ure (1933–1975), Scottish actress
- Midge Ure (born 1953), Scottish musician
- Nicky Youre, professional name of Nicholas Scott Ure (born 1999), American singer-songwriter
- Percy Ure (1879–1950), British classics professor, founder of Ure Museum of Greek Archaeology, husband of Annie Ure
- Robbie Ure (born 2004), Scottish footballer
- William Ure (1913–2001), Canadian politician

== As an acronym ==
- Kuressaare Airport (IATA airport code), Estonia
- Ukrainian Soviet Encyclopedia, Ukrainian abbreviation, Ukrayinska Radyanska Entsyklopediya
- Unión de Radioaficionados Españoles, an amateur radio organization in Spain
- Universal Network Objects Runtime Environment, an independent OpenOffice.org component model
- University Radio Essex, campus radio station for the University of Essex, England
- Unrecoverable read error rate, a media assessment measure related to RAID hard disk drive storage technology
- Xpression FM, campus radio station for the University of Exeter, which used to be named University Radio Exeter

== Other uses ==
- Urë, Albania
- Ure, Shetland, a place in Shetland, Scotland
- Ure Museum of Greek Archaeology, Reading, England
- Old term for aurochs, an extinct species of large wild cattle
- River Ure, North Yorkshire, England
- Ure (Orne), River in the Orne department of France.
- River Ure, Lorn, a river in the South-west Highlands of Scotland
- Ure (missile), a South Korean short range tactical ballistic missile

== See also ==
- San José de Uré
- Ur, an ancient city
- Uri (disambiguation)
