= Maria Fragoulaki =

Maria Fragoulaki^{FHEA} is Senior Lecturer in Ancient Greek History at Cardiff University. She is an expert on the history and literature of ancient Greece, particularly Thucydides, Herodotus, and Greek historiography.

== Education ==
Fragoulaki was awarded her PhD in Classics from University College London in 2010. Her thesis was entitled Kinship in Thucydides: xyngeneia and Relatedness Between Cities and Ethnic Groups. She received her Masters in Classics Education from King's College London, and she studied for a BA in Classical Philology at the National and Kapodistrian University of Athens, Greece.

== Career and research ==
Fragoulaki published a monograph, Kinship in Thucydides: Intercommunal Ties and Historical Narrative, with Oxford University Press in 2014. The book was based on her doctoral thesis. As a research student at the University of London, she received the 2006 George Grote Prize for Ancient History. Before taking a post at Cardiff University, Fragoulaki held teaching and research positions at Birkbeck, UCL, and KCL.

Fragoulaki is a Fellow of the Higher Education Academy. She was a Visiting Researcher at Harvard University, Center for Hellenic Studies, Washington, DC, in 2019. In 2018-19 she was a Visiting Research Fellow of the Institute of Classical Studies, School of Advanced Study, University of London.

She was a elected a Fellow of the Royal Historical Society in May 2025.

== Bibliography ==
- Fragoulaki, M. and Morley, N. (eds.) 2024. Doing Things with Thucydides: Politics, Education, Performance. Bulletin of the Institute of Classical Studies and Oxford University Press.
- Fragoulaki, M. 'Ethnicity in Thucydides'. The Cambridge Companion to Thucydides, ed. by Polly Low. Cambridge University Press, Cambridge, 2023.
- Fragoulaki, M. and Constantakopoulou, C. (eds.) 2020. Shaping Memory in Ancient Greece: Poetry, Historiography and Epigraphy. Supplement volume 11. Newcastle upon Tyne: Histos.
- Fragoulaki, M. 2014 Kinship in Thucydides: Intercommunal Ties and Historical Narrative. Oxford: Oxford University Press. ISBN 9780199697779
