= Ellie Mackin Roberts =

Australian classical scholar

Academic background
- Education: Monash University (BA); Monash University (MA); King's College London
- Thesis: Echoes of the Underworld: Manifestations of Death-Related Gods in Early Greek Cult and Literature (2015)

Academic work
- Discipline: Classics
- Sub-discipline: Greek Literature
- Institutions: University of Bristol, University of Leeds
- Website: www.elliemackinroberts.net

Ellie Mackin Roberts (born c. 1984) is an Australian Classicist based in the United Kingdom. She is an expert on ancient Greek religion through material and visual culture.

== Education ==
Mackin Roberts received her PhD from the Department of Classics, King's College London, in 2015. Her thesis was entitled Echoes of the Underworld: Manifestations of Death-Related Gods in Early Greek Cult and Literature. She was awarded an MA in Classics from Monash University in 2011, and a BA in Classics from Monash University in 2008.

== Research and career ==
Mackin Roberts published her first monograph Underworld Gods in Ancient Greek Religion: Death and Reciprocity with Routledge in 2020. She has written two books on the ancient world for wider audiences: Heroines of Olympus: The Forgotten Women of Greek Mythology, published with Welbeck in 2023, and Brief Histories: Ancient Greece: Everything You Wanted to Know But Forgot To Ask, published by Orion in 2024. Mackin Roberts occupies a prominent position in bringing Classics to wider audiences through social media, and has nearly 50,000 followers on TikTok. She has contributed multiple episodes to the HistoryHit Podcast, hosted by historian Tristan Hughes, and for the podcast Let's Talk About Myths Baby. She has written for the TLS and for The Conversation.

Mackin Roberts has held various academic positions across UK universities. She is currently a lecturer in Classics at the University of Leeds. She was previously a Research Fellow at the University of Bristol, and is a Research Associate at the Institute of Classical Studies, University of London.

== Bibliography ==
- 2024: Brief Histories: Ancient Greece, Seven Dials
- 2023: Heroines of Olympus: The Forgotten Women of Greek Mythology, Welbek Publishing
- 2020: Underworld Gods in Ancient Greek Religion: Death and Reciprocity, Routledge
