= Gertrude Smith =

American classical philologist and jurist

- Born: December 23, 1894; Peoria, Illinois
- Died: 1985 (aged 90–91)
- Parent(s): James Almon Smith and Edith Mann Smith

Academic background
- Education: Bradley University, Chicago University
- Thesis: The Administration of Justice from Hesiod to Solon

Academic work
- Discipline: Classical archaeology
- Institutions: Chicago University; American School of Classical Studies at Athens
- Notable works: The Administration of Justice from Homer to Aristotle

Gertrude Elizabeth Smith (1894–1985) was the Edwin Olson Professor of Greek at the University of Chicago. She is known for her work on Greek law and her longstanding involvement in and support of the Summer Session of the American School of Classical Studies at Athens. She was the first woman to be president of the Classical Association of the Middle West and South and is currently the only woman to have been president of CAMWS and the American Philological Association.

== Career ==
Gertrude Smith was born in Peoria, Illinois and first studied at Bradley University before obtaining her undergraduate (BA 1916) and graduate (MA 1917, PhD 1921) degrees at the University of Chicago. Smith's doctoral dissertation focused on Greek law, a subject she continued to work on during her time on the faculty of the University of Chicago. Smith became the Edwin Olson Professor of Greek in 1933 and from 1934 to 1961 she was the Chair of the Department of Classics.

Smith's work focused on Greek law, on which she published extensively. In collaboration with Robert Bonner, Smith wrote the two volume work The Administration of Justice from Homer to Aristotle, a work which remains the key reference for work on Greek law. Smith also published a series of articles on the administration of justice in ancient Greece with Bonner in the 1940s.

Smith was President of the Classical Association of the Middle West and South (CAMWS) in 1933-34 and 1940-41 and President of the American Philological Association (now the Society for Classical Studies) in 1958.

Smith served on the editorial board of the journal Classical Philology from 1925 to 1965.

Smith was a founding member of the national Classics honor society Eta Sigma Phi and was instrumental in making it a national society.

Smith's association with the American School of Classical Studies at Athens began in the 1940s. In 1948 Smith was a participant in the Summer Session and spent six weeks travelling around Greece. She returned in 1949 as the Annual Professor of Greek Literature. Smith led three Summer Sessions in 1958, 1960, and 1961.

Smith was the Chairman of the Committee on Admissions and Fellowships of the American School of Classical Studies at Athens from 1945 to 1963. Smith was, in particular, highly influential in the organisation of the Summer Session from the 1950s onwards and noted that the School's function was "to afford the opportunity to the uninitiated to get some acquaintance with Greece and really to learn something of its history, art, literature, and monuments" (ADM REC Series 100, Box 106/1, Folder 3, 16 September 1957). Smith was also part of the move to offer Byzantine Studies at ASCSA, with the Gennadeion Fellowship in Post-Classical Greece first awarded in 1963. Smith was an advocate for wide student access to the Summer Session and was a founder of the Ben Hodge Hill Scholarship for students. Towards the end of Smith's involvement in the ASCSA, she worked to widen access to membership of the School to non-American and Canadian students.

After Smith's retirement from the University of Chicago in 1961, she was visiting professor at the University of Illinois at Chicago (1961–65), Loyola University Chicago (1966-68), and Vanderbilt University (1968–69).

== Gertrude Smith Professorship at the American School of Classical Studies at Athens ==
Smith bequeathed $100,000 to the American School of Classical Studies at Athens on her death in 1985 for student scholarships for the Summer Session. The following year, the directorship of the Summer Session was named the Gertrude Smith Professorship and is held by a visiting academic (or academics) to direct the Summer Session of the School. Previous holders include:

- 1986 John H. Oakley (College of William and Mary in Virginia)
- 1988 Cynthia W. Shelmerdine (University of Texas at Austin)
- 1989 Kenneth F. Kitchell Jr. (Louisiana State University)
- 1992 Clayton M. Lehmann (University of South Dakota)
- 1993 Jodi Magness (University of North Carolina at Chapel Hill)
- 1994 Jenifer Neils (Case Western Reserve University)
- 1996 James P. Sickinger (Florida State University)
- 1998 Ann Steiner (Franklin and Marshall College)
- 2000 Timothy Winters (Austin Peay State University)
- 2001 Mark D. Fullerton (Ohio State University) and Clayton M. Lehmann (University of South Dakota)
- 2002 Lisa R. Brody (Yale University Art Gallery)
- 2003 Peter Krentz (Davidson College)
- 2005 Mark Munn (Pennsylvania State University) and Mary Lou Zimmerman Munn (Pennsylvania State University)
- 2006 Daniel Levine (J. William Fulbright College of Arts and Sciences)
- 2007 Judith Barringer (University of Edinburgh)
- 2009 Eleni Hasaki (University of Arizona) and Timothy Winters (Austin Peay State University)
- 2010 Kirk Ormand (Oberlin College) and Clayton M. Lehmann (University of South Dakota)
- 2011 Mark Munn (Pennsylvania State University) and Mary Lou Zimmerman Munn (Pennsylvania State University)
- 2012 Timothy Winters (Austin Peay State University)
- 2014 Lee L. Brice (Western Illinois University) and Georgia Tsouvala (Illinois State University)
- 2015 Timothy Winters (Austin Peay State University)
- 2016 Amy C. Smith (University of Reading)
- 2017 Ann M. Nicgorski (Willamette University)
- 2018 Daniel Levine (J. William Fulbright College of Arts and Sciences)
- 2019 Matthew A. Sears (University of New Brunswick)

== Bibliography ==
- "On Verbal Repetition in Aeschylus" Studies Ullmann (1960) 19-28
- "Cretan Law and Common Tendencies in Archaic Greek Law" Acta Congressus Madvigiani Volume I (Copenhagen 1958) 235-50
- "More Recent Theories on the Origin and Interrelation of the First Classifications of Greek Laws" Cahiers d'histoire modiale 3 (1956) 173-95
- "Robert J. Bonner: 1868-1946" The Classical Journal 41(8) (May, 1946), 360-362
- with R. Bonner, "Administration of Justice in Boeotia" Classical Philology 40(1) (Jan 1945) 11-23
- "ΠΟΛΙΣ ΑΝΔΡΑ ΔΙΔΑΣΚΕΙ" The Classical Journal 38(5) (Feb 1943) 260-279
- with R. Bonner, "Administration of Justice in the Delphic Amphictyony" Classical Philology 38(1) (Jan 1943) 1-12
- with R. Bonner, "Administration of Justice in Sparta" Classical Philology 37(2) (Apr 1942) 113-129
- with R Bonner, The Administration of Justice from Homer to Aristotle (The University of Chicago Press, 1930, 1938) 2 volumes.
- "The Jurisdiction of the Areopagus" Classical Philology 22(1) (Jan 1927) 61-79
- "Homeric Orators and Auditors" The Classical Journal 21(5) (Feb 1926) 355–364
- "Dicasts in the Ephetic Courts" Classical Philology,19(4) (Oct 1924) 353-358
- "The Name "Ten Thousand"" The Classical Journal 18(9) (Jun 1923) 570-570
- "Early Greek Codes" Classical Philology 17(3) (July 1922) 187-201
- "The Prytaneum in the Athenian Amnesty Law" Classical Philology 16(4) (Oct 1921) 345-353
- "Athenian Casualty Lists" Classical Philology 14(4) (Oct 1919) 351-364
