= Avlida (given name) =

Avlida (Russian: Авли́да) is a Russian female first name. In 1924–1930, the name was included into various Soviet calendars, which included the new and often artificially created names promoting the new Soviet realities and encouraging the break with the tradition of using the names in the Synodal Menologia. This particular name was after Avlida, a town in Boeotia, where according to a legend, the Greek army set sail for the Trojan War and which served as the setting for the Euripides play Iphigenia in Aulis.
