= Hasselmann =

Hasselmann or Haßelmann is a German surname. Notable people with the surname include:

- Britta Haßelmann (born 1961), German politician
- Joice Hasselmann (born 1978), Brazilian journalist
- Karl Hasselmann (1883–1966), German cinematographer
- Klaus Hasselmann (born 1931), German oceanographer and climate modeller
- Nina Hasselmann (born 1986), German field hockey player
- Wilhelm Hasselmann (1844–1916), German socialist politician and activist

== Variants ==
Variant spellings include Haselman, Hasselman, and Hasselmans.
Notable people with such surnames include the below, listed alphabetically by given name.

- Alphonse Hasselmans (1845–1912), Belgium-born French harpist, composer, and pedagogue
- Ben Hasselman (1898–1984), Dutch military figure
- Bill Haselman (born 1966), American baseball player and coach
- Louis Hasselmans (1878–1957), French cellist and conductor

== See also ==
- The Hasselmann Painter, ancient Greek vase painter of the mid-5th century BC
