= Greg Woolf =

British historian & academic

Greg Woolf FSA FSA Scot FBA
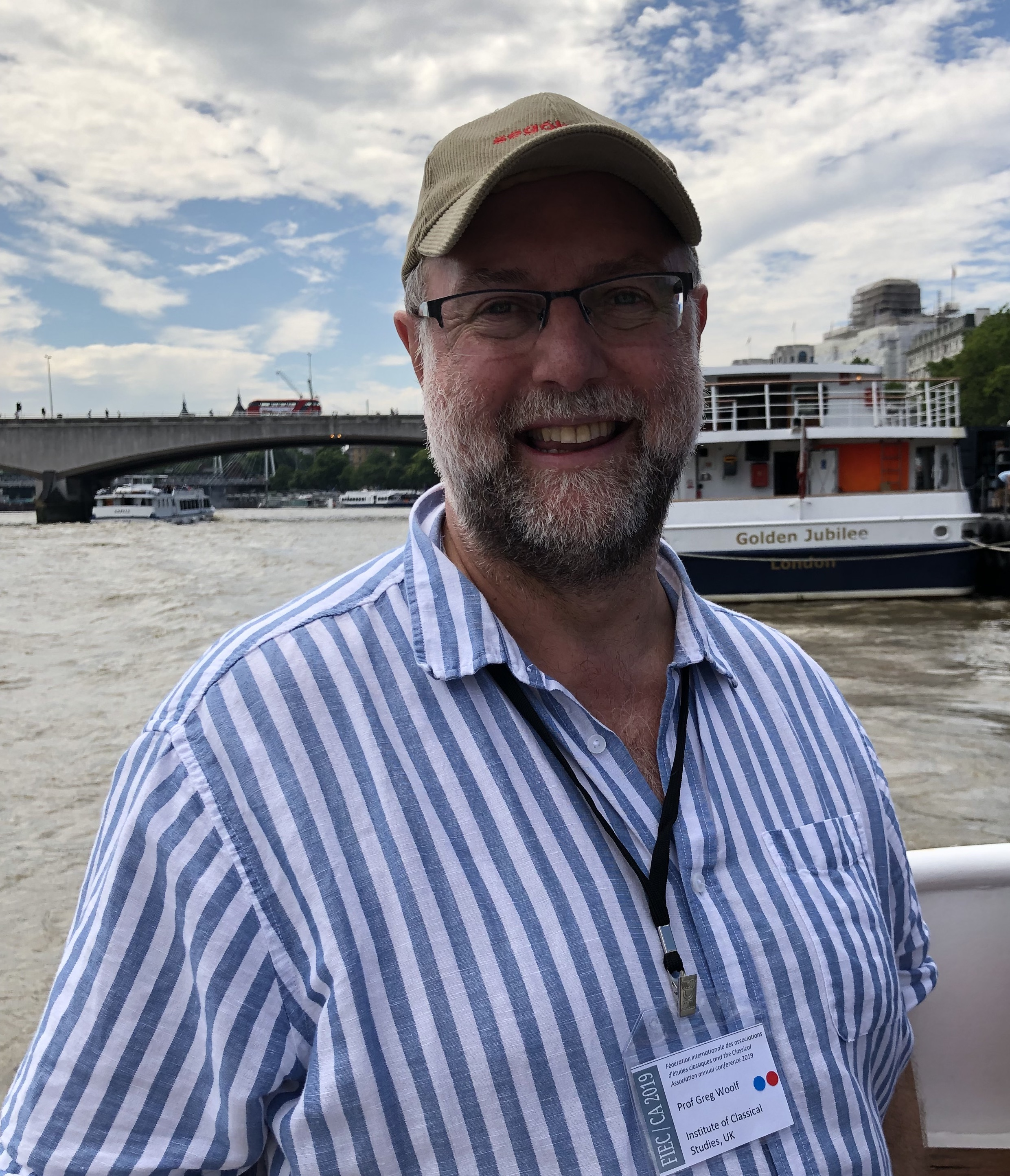
- Born: Gregory Duncan Woolf; 3 December 1961 (age 64)
- Title: Leon Levy Director of NYU Institute for the Study of the Ancient World

Academic background
- Education: Christ Church, Oxford; Trinity College, Cambridge
- Thesis: Cultural change in central France under Roman rule (1991)
- Doctoral advisor: Peter Garnsey

Academic work
- Discipline: Ancient history Archaeology
- Sub-discipline: History of the Roman Empire; Classical archaeology; Iron Age Europe
- Institutions: University of Leicester; Christ's College, Cambridge; Magdalen College, Oxford; Brasenose College, Oxford; Faculty of Classics, University of Oxford; University of St Andrews; University of London; Institute of Classical Studies; University of California, Los Angeles

Gregory Duncan Woolf, FSA, FSA Scot, FBA (born 3 December 1961) is a British ancient historian, archaeologist, and academic. He specialises in the late Iron Age and the Roman Empire. Since July 2021, he has been Ronald J. Mellor Chair of Ancient History at University of California, Los Angeles. He previously taught at the University of Leicester and the University of Oxford, and was then Professor of Ancient History at the University of St Andrews from 1998 to 2014. From 2015 to 2021, he was the Director of the Institute of Classical Studies, and Professor of Classics at the University of London. From January 2025 he assumed the role of Director at the Institute for the Study of the Ancient World (ISAW) at New York University.

== Early life and education ==
Woolf was born on 3 December 1961 in Hemel Hempstead, Hertfordshire, England. He was educated at Bexhill Grammar School, a grammar school in Bexhill-on-Sea, East Sussex. From 1981 to 1985, he studied ancient and modern history at Christ Church, Oxford. He graduated from the University of Oxford with a Bachelor of Arts (BA) degree in 1985; as per tradition, this was later promoted to a Master of Arts (MA (Oxon)) degree. From 1985 to 1990, he undertook postgraduate research in classics at Trinity College, Cambridge. He graduated from the University of Cambridge with a Doctor of Philosophy (PhD) degree in 1990. His doctoral supervisors were Peter Garnsey, Keith Hopkins, Ian Hodder, and Sander van der Leeuw. His doctoral thesis was titled "Cultural change in central France under Roman rule".

== Academic career ==
Woolf began his academic career while still studying for his doctorate; he was a part-time lecturer at the University of Leicester and a research fellow of Christ's College, Cambridge. In 1990, after completing his doctorate, he moved to the University of Oxford to teach ancient history and archaeology. From 1990 to 1993, he was a Fellow of Magdalen College, Oxford. Then, from 1993 to 1998, he was a Fellow of Brasenose College, Oxford and a lecturer in the Faculty of Classics.

In 1998, Woolf moved to the University of St Andrews to become Professor of Ancient History. He was Head of the School of Classics between 2004 and 2009. During the 2009 to 2010 academic year, he was visiting fellow at the Max Weber Center for Advanced Cultural and Social Studies, University of Erfurt. On 1 January 2015, he joined the University of London as Professor of Classics and Director of the Institute of Classical Studies.

In July 2021, Woolf moved to the United States, where he joined University of California, Los Angeles (UCLA) as Ronald J. Mellor Chair of Ancient History. In 2022, he became editor of the Journal of Roman Archaeology. Since January 2025, he has been professor of ancient Mediterranean studies and director of the Institute for the Study of the Ancient World, New York University.

Woolf gave the Rhind Lectures for 2004/2005; the series was titled Men who turned towards the light: Cult and creativity in the Romans' world. The Rhind Lectures are a series of lectures on archaeology and they are hosted by the Society of Antiquaries of Scotland. In July 2012, he appeared on BBC Radio 4 as a guest on In Our Time to discuss Hadrian's Wall. In December 2012, he appeared again on In Our Time, this time to discuss the Cult of Mithras.

== Honours ==
In 2016, he was elected a Fellow of the Society of Antiquaries of London (FSA), and a Member of the Academia Europaea (MAE). In July 2017, he was elected a Fellow of the British Academy (FBA), the United Kingdom's national academy for the humanities and social sciences. In 2021 he was elected a member of the European Academy of Sciences and Arts.

== Selected works ==
- Woolf, Greg (January 1994). "Becoming Roman, staying Greek: Culture, identity and the civilizing process in the Roman East". Proceedings of the Cambridge Philological Society. 40: 116–143. doi:10.1017/S0068673500001875. S2CID 170935906.
- Bowman, Alan K.; Woolf, Greg, eds. (1994). Literacy and power in the ancient world. Cambridge: Cambridge University Press. ISBN 978-0521433693.
- Woolf, Greg (1998). Becoming Roman: the origins of provincial civilization in Gaul. Cambridge: Cambridge University Press. ISBN 978-0521414456.
- Woolf, Greg, ed. (2003). The Cambridge illustrated history of the Roman world. Cambridge: Cambridge University Press. ISBN 978-0521827751.
- Edwards, Catharine; Woolf, Greg, eds. (2003). Rome the cosmopolis. New York: Cambridge University Press. ISBN 978-0521800051.
- Woolf, Greg (2006). Et tu, Brute?: the murder of Caesar and political assassination. London: Profile Books. ISBN 978-1861977410.
- Woolf, Greg (2011). Tales of the barbarians: ethnography and empire in the Roman West. Chichester, West Sussex: Wiley-Blackwell. ISBN 978-1405160735.
- Woolf, Greg (2012). Rome: an empire's story. Oxford: Oxford University Press. ISBN 978-0199603084.
- Hemelrijk, Emily; Woolf, Greg, eds. (2013). Women and the Roman City in the Latin West. Leiden: Brill. ISBN 978-9004255944.
- König, Jason; Oikonomopoulou, Katerina; Woolf, Greg, eds. (2013). Ancient libraries. Cambridge: Cambridge University Press. ISBN 978-1107012561.
- König, Jason; Woolf, Greg, eds. (2013). Encyclopaedism from antiquity to the Renaissance. Cambridge: Cambridge University Press. ISBN 978-1107038233.
- König, Jason; Woolf, Greg, eds. (2017). Authority and expertise in ancient scientific culture. Cambridge: Cambridge University Press. ISBN 978-1107060067.
- Woolf, Greg (2020). The life and death of ancient cities: a natural history. Oxford: Oxford University Press. ISBN 978-0199664733.
- Rüpke, Jörg; Woolf, Greg, eds. (2021). Religion in the Roman Empire. Stuttgart: Kohlhammer Verlag. ISBN 9783170292260.

Academic offices
Preceded by John North	Director of the Institute of Classical Studies; 2015 to 2021	Succeeded by Katherine Harloe
