= Amy C. Smith =

Archaeologist and museum curator

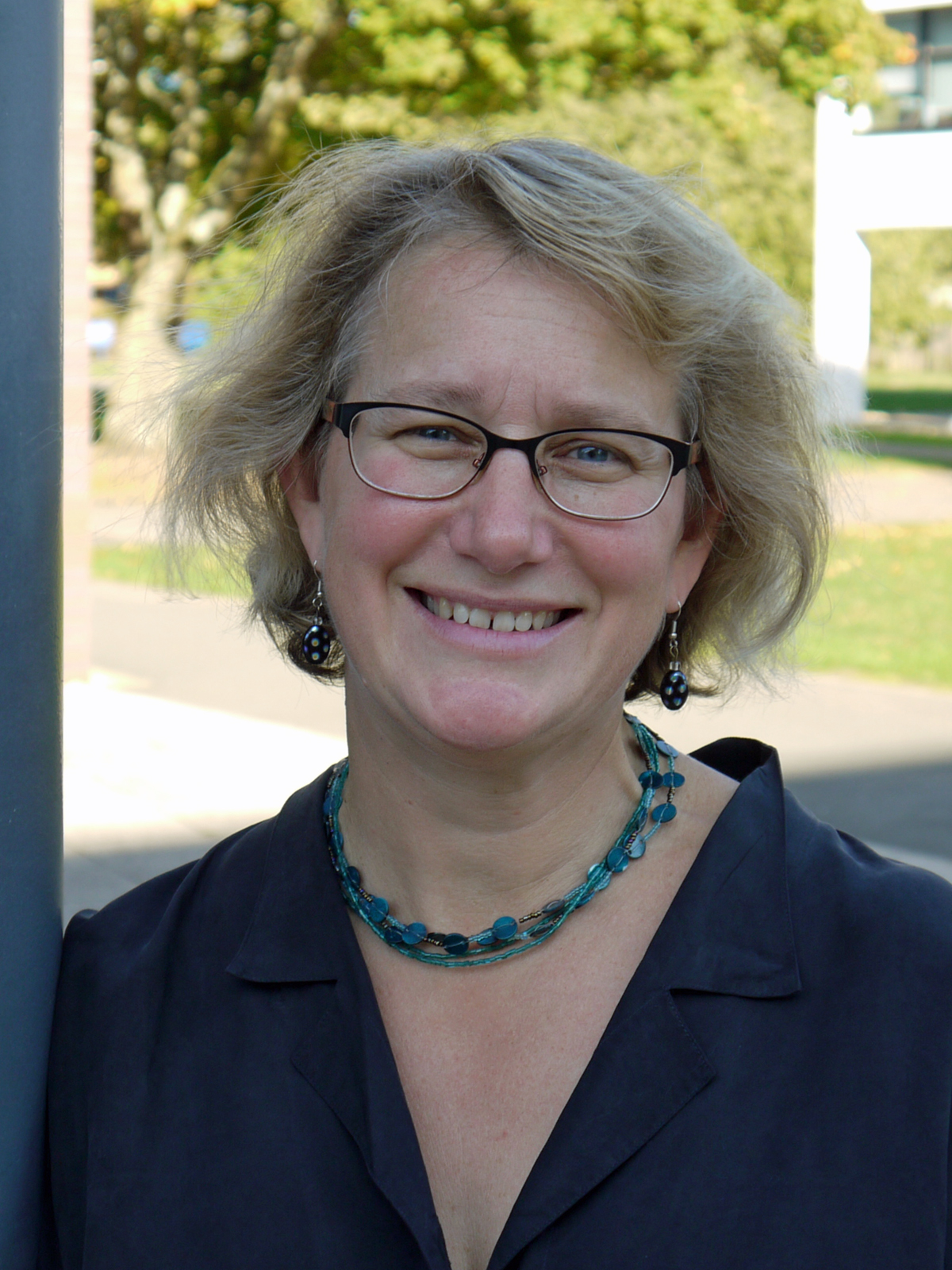

Academic background
- Education: Dartmouth College, Yale University

Academic work
- Discipline: Classical archaeology
- Institutions: Tufts University, Boston College, Massachusetts College of Art, University of Reading

Amy C. Smith is the current Curator of the Ure Museum of Greek Archaeology and Professor of Classical Archaeology at Reading University. She is known for her work on iconography, the history of collections, and digital museology.

== Career ==
Smith received her BA from Dartmouth College and her MA, MPhil, and PhD (1997) from Yale University, all in classical archaeology. Her doctoral thesis was on the topic of Greek personification and this work was published as a monograph in 2011.

Smith taught at Tufts University, Boston College, and Massachusetts College of Art and worked at the Yale University Art Gallery before moving to the University of Reading. At Reading, Smith headed the redevelopment of the Ure Museum of Greek Archaeology in 2004-05 and has worked on the university's collection of vases publishing the 23rd British fascicule of the Corpus Vasorum Antiquorum project in 2007. Her work on iconography has included research on the depiction of Aphrodite and personifications in Greek art.

Smith's current work centres on the 2017/18 anniversary of Johann Joachim Winckelmann. She is a member of the Winckelmann-Gesellschaft's International Committee focusing on events to celebrate the 300th anniversary of Winckelmann's birth. Smith is a co-organiser of a series of conferences to mark the anniversary and is also the co-curator (with Katherine Harloe) of the exhibition Winckelmann in Italy: Curiosity and connoisseurship in the 18th-century gentleman's study at Christ Church Upper Library from 29 June to 26 October 2018.

== Professional work and associations ==
Creator (with Brian Fuchs) of the Virtual Lightbox for Museums and Archives.

Founding member in 2011 of the Pottery in Context Research Network (ICS, London).

Member of the Digital Classics Advisory Committee, 2016-18 (ICS, London).

Founding member of the International Network of Classical Archaeology University Collections.

Research associate of the Beazley Archive, University of Oxford.

Member of the Managing Committee of the American School of Classical Studies at Athens, 2015–16; excavated at their excavations in Greece (the Athenian Agora and Corinth) and Spain (Pollentia).

Member of the advisory board of the Institute in Ancient Itineraries: The Digital Lives of Art History based at King's College, London.

== Honours ==
2016 Gertrude Smith Visiting professor, American School of Classical Studies at Athens.

Smith was a 2017/2018 visiting research fellow at the Humanities Research Centre of the Australian National University in Canberra and was invited to give the 2017 Trendall Lecture at La Trobe University in Melbourne entitled 1766 and All That! Winckelmann and the Study of Greek Vases.

== Selected publications ==
- with K Harloe and C Neagu (eds), Winckelmann and Curiosity: In the 18th-century Gentleman's Library (Christ Church Library, Oxford and Ure Museum of Greek Archaeology, University of Reading; 2018)
- Winckelmann, Greek masterpieces, and architectural sculpture. Prolegomena to a history of classical archaeology in museums (Studies in Classical Archaeology, 1. 2017)
- Polis and personification in Classical Athenian art (Monumenta Graeca et Romana, 19. Brill, Leiden 2011)
- with S Pickup (eds), Brill's Companion to Aphrodite (Brill's Companions in Classical Studies. Brill, Leiden 2010)
- Corpus vasorum antiquorum, Great Britiain fascicule 23. Reading Museum Service (Oxford University Press, 2007)
