= Vathy, Euboea =

Vathy Βαθύ
- Community
- Location within Greece
- Coordinates: 38°24′N 23°36′E
- Country: Greece
- Administrative region: Central Greece
- Regional unit: Euboea
- Municipality: Chalcis
- Municipal unit: Avlida

Population (2021)
  - Community: 5,029
- Time zone: UTC+2 (EET)
  - Summer (DST): UTC+3 (EEST)
- Vehicle registration: ΧΑ

Vathy (Greek: Βαθύ) is a town and a community in the municipal unit of Avlida in the Euboea regional unit, Greece. It is situated on the Greek mainland, near the South Euboean Gulf, 6 km south of Chalcis. The Greek National Road 44 (Thebes - Chalcis - Karystos) passes west of the town. The community Vathy consists of the town Vathy and the villages Mikro Vathy, Paralia and Ritsona.

== Population ==
Historical population
Year	Pop.	±%
2001	3,715	—
2011	4,098	+10.3%
2021	5,029	+22.7%

== Ritsona ==
The village Ritsona (Greek: Ριτσώνα), population 535, is 7 km west of Vathy. The name Ritsona is believed to come from resin, referring to the pines that used to be abundant in the area. In recent years due to forest fires, a large part of the area's pine trees have disappeared. Today there are many vineyards.

Its history began during the Homeric period with the ancient Boeotian city of Mykalissos. The archaeological site was extensively excavated between 1909 and 1922 by Ronald Burrows and Percy and Annie Ure, under the aegis of the American School of Classical Studies at Athens. In May 1944, during World War II, the occupying Germans executed 110 Greek soldiers here that had been wounded in the Greco-Italian War in retaliation for an assault by the Greek resistance.

The Ritsona Rally is one of the most famous car races in Greece, taking place every year in December since 1956.

Ritsona is the place, where – 13 years after legalization – the first crematorium in Greece was opened at the end of September 2019.

== See also ==
- List of settlements in the Euboea regional unit
