= Ure mummified cat's head =

Egyptian animal mummy

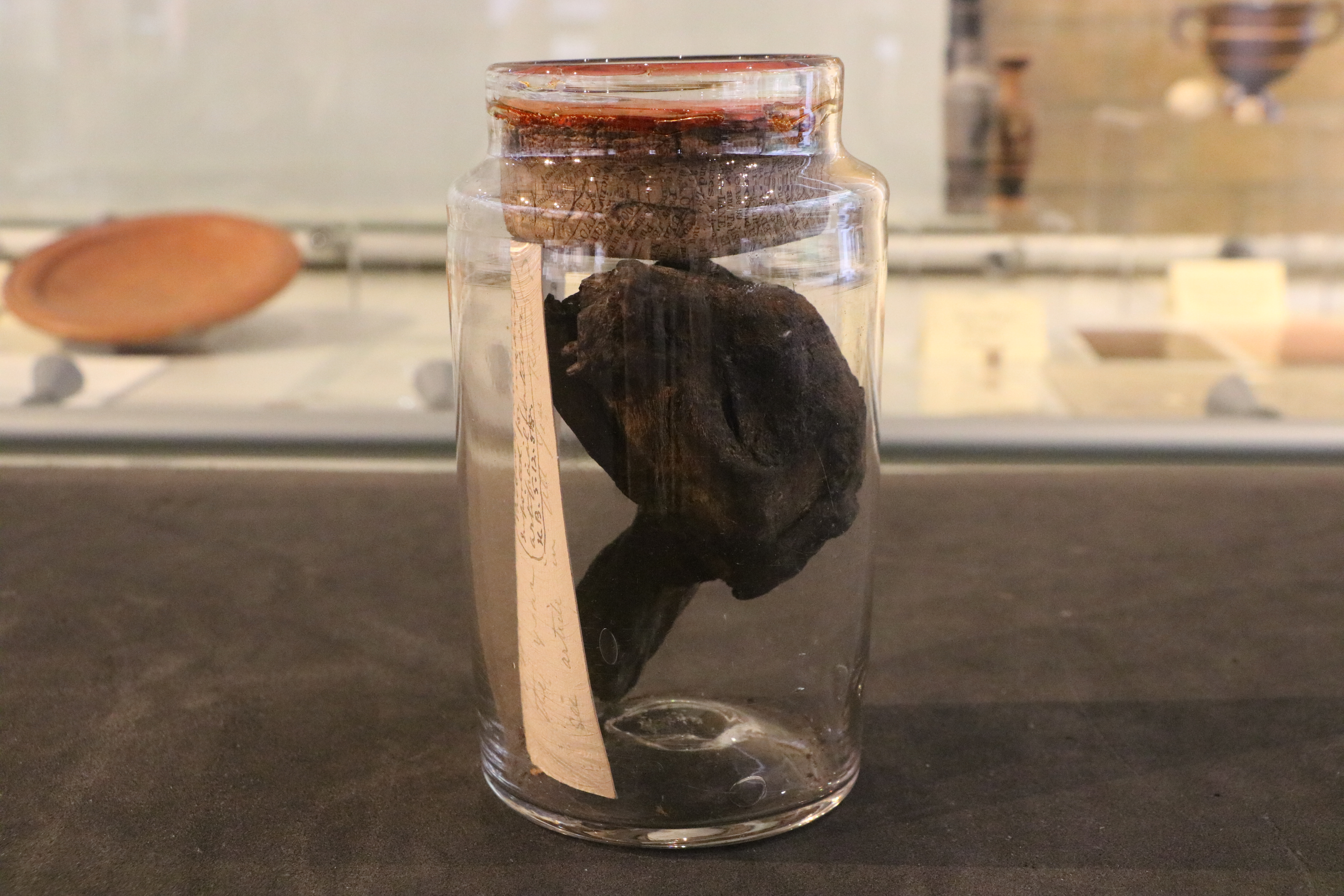
Front-left of the mummified cat's head, displayed in a late Victorian jar

The Ure mummified cat's head is the unwrapped head and neck remains of an ancient Egyptian mummified domestic cat. The animal mummy has been displayed in a glass jar contemporary with its discovery in the late 1800s. The cat's remains are in the collection of the Ure Museum of Greek Archaeology in Reading, England.

== Description ==
Only the cat's head and neck remain, with most of the original wrapping having been removed. The head has been preserved well enough that teeth and whiskers remain clearly visible, and most of the skin remains intact.

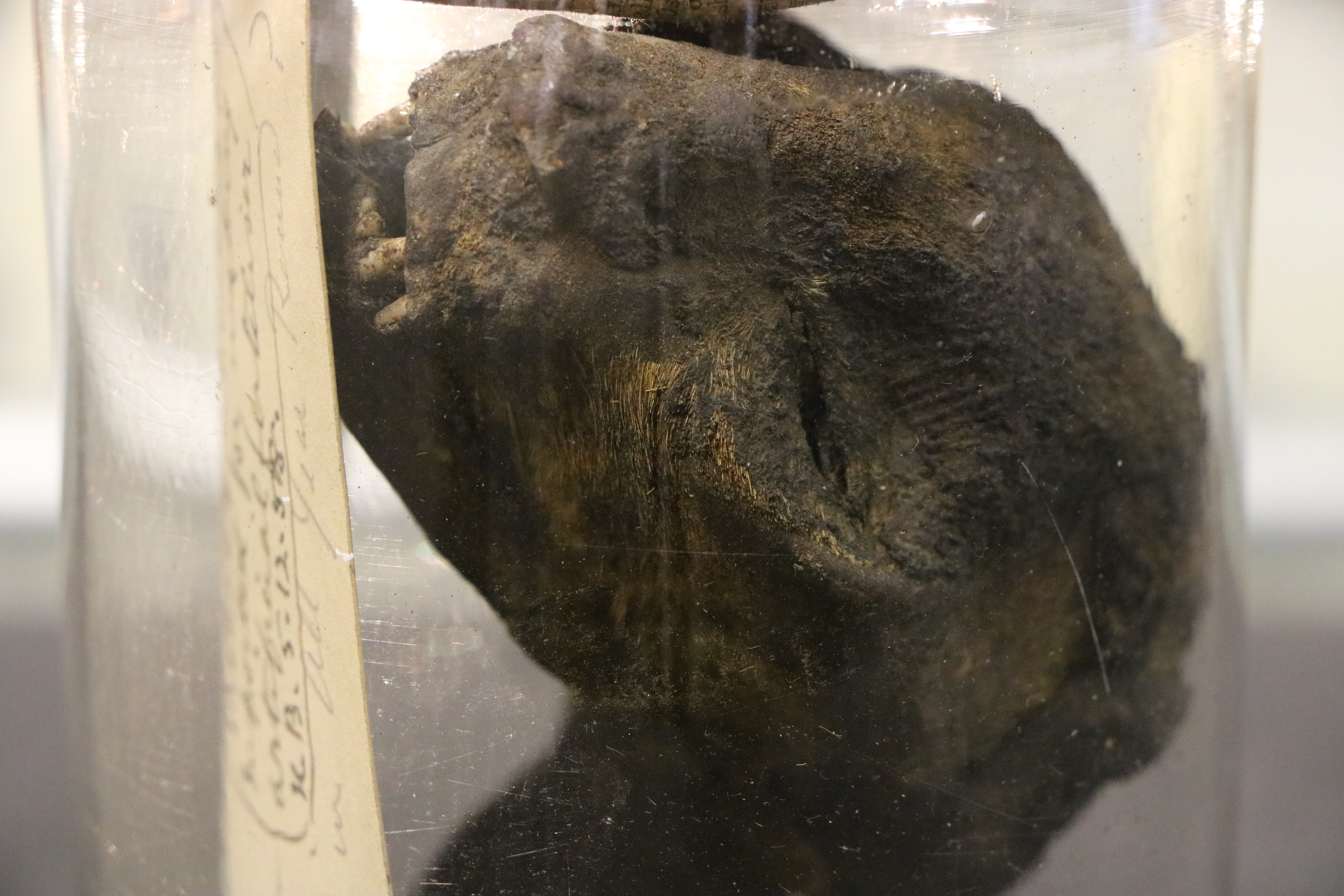
Detail of the mummified cat's head, clearly showing whiskers, fur, and teeth

The head is sealed in a Victorian glass jar closed with a newspaper-wrapped cork lid. Within the jar, alongside the head, is an invitation card the reverse of which has been used as a makeshift label for the contents, helping to date the jar.

== Provenance ==
The item as-is entered the collection of the Ure Museum, along with a number of other ancient Egyptian items, in 1958 as part of a donation by Henry Bassett, Professor of Chemistry at the University of Reading from 1912 to 1946 and Dean of the Faculty of Science from 1926 to 1930. How Bassett came to own it and its prior history are currently unknown. It is, however, very likely that the mummy was one of a number saved from being processed into fertilizer in the 1890s.

In February 1890, several tons of mummified cats of varying conditions arrived at Liverpool Docks and were auctioned for processing into fertilizer (and fuel). These had been discovered (by accident) in 1889 at Speos Artemidos, close to Beni Hasan, Egypt. Some of the better-preserved cats, or parts of them, were auctioned off singly; a number of these are on display at the National Museums Liverpool’s World Museum. The importation and subsequent auctioning of the mummified cats became a media phenomenon, with numerous national and international newspapers reporting on the proceedings; locals and tourists attended the auctions, too, leading to notable crowds at the related events.

A FORTUNATE CAT-ASTROPHE.—In the category of consignments surely that of twenty thousand mummified cats, recently arrived at Liverpool from Egypt, is the queerest. It impresses the imagination and appeals to the feelings to consider that, after being buried decently for four thousand years, they have been exhumed to furnish manure for a distant land. They were discovered in a cats' cemetery—a famous catacomb in its day, about a hundred miles from Cairo—somewhere about the first cataract, isn't it? —by an Egyptian fellah—lucky fellah this!—who accidentally fell-ah into it and a good thing at the same time. From the locality of the discovery, we presume that on this special occasion Cairo did neither kill the cats nor bury them.

— Manchester Times, 15 February 1890

== Modern history ==
The cat's head is on permanent display in the museum's Death section. The object has also played a prominent role in previous marketing for the museum and is one of the best-known items of the collection.
