= Ronald Burrows =

British academic, archaeologist, and Classicist

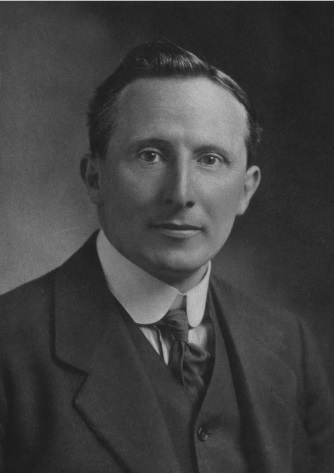
- Born: Ronald Montagu Burrows; 16 August 1867; Rugby, Warwickshire, England
- Died: 14 May 1920 (aged 52); London, England
- Education: Charterhouse School; Christ Church, Oxford
- Known for: Minoan civilization
- Scientific career
- Fields: Archaeology
- Workplaces: Cardiff University; University of Manchester; King's College London

Ronald Montagu Burrows (16 August 1867 – 14 May 1920) was a British archaeologist and academic, who served as Principal of King's College London from 1913 to 1920.

== Early life ==
He was born on 16 August 1867 in Rugby, Warwickshire, England, the son of the Rev. Leonard Francis Burrows, a master at Rugby School, and his wife Mary Vicars. His grandfather was General Montagu Burrows, and he was a nephew of Montagu Burrows, Chichele Professor at Oxford. He was educated at Charterhouse and Christ Church, Oxford, arriving there in 1886 and graduating in Greats in 1890.

He had an older brother, Leonard Hedley Burrows (1857–1940), who became the first Bishop of Sheffield.

== Career ==
Burrows began his academic career as assistant to Gilbert Murray, Professor of Greek at the University of Glasgow from 1891 to 1897. In 1898, Burrows was appointed Professor of Greek at University College, Cardiff, where he taught until 1908. He was Hulme Professor of Greek at the University of Manchester between 1908 and 1913. In 1913, he was appointed Principal of King's College London, a post he held until his death in 1920. His time there was marked by the foundation of the Koreas Chair.

Burrows was a strong, uncritical supporter of Eleftherios Venizelos and played a part in bringing Greece into the First World War as a political and military ally of the British Empire.

== Works ==
Burrows was a noted archaeologist who carried out excavations in Greece at Pílos (ancient Pylos, on the Coryphasium promontory) and the nearby island of Sfaktiría. This work helped to establish studies of the Minoan civilization. With Percy and Annie Ure, he undertook major excavations at Rhitsona in Boeotia.

Academic offices
Preceded by Arthur Headlam	Principal of King's College London; 1913–1920	Succeeded by Sir Ernest Barker
