= Catharine Edwards (historian) =

British ancient historian and academic

Catharine Edwards FBA
- Born: Catharine Harmon Edwards; 27 May 1963 (age 63); Redruth, Cornwall, England

Academic background
- Education: Trinity College, Cambridge

Academic work
- Discipline: Ancient history
- Sub-discipline: Ancient Rome; City of Rome; cultural history; Latin literature; Seneca the Younger; classical reception studies
- Institutions: Selwyn College, Cambridge; University of Bristol; Birkbeck, University of London

Catharine Harmon Edwards FBA (born 27 May 1963) is a British ancient historian and academic. She is Professor of Classics and Ancient History at Birkbeck College, University of London. She is a specialist in Roman cultural history and Latin prose literature, particularly Seneca the Younger.

== Early life and education ==
Edwards was born on 27 May 1963 in Redruth, Cornwall, England. She was educated at Clifton High School, a private school in Bristol. She studied classics at Trinity College, Cambridge, graduating with a Bachelor of Arts (BA) degree in 1985 and a Doctor of Philosophy (PhD) degree in 1990. Her doctoral thesis was titled "Transgression and control: studies in ancient Roman immorality".

== Academic career ==
Edwards began her academic career as a junior research fellow at Selwyn College, Cambridge from 1988 to 1989. She then moved to the University of Bristol where she was a lecturer from 1989. She was promoted to senior lecturer in 1997 and to reader in 1999.

Edwards joined Birkbeck College, University of London in 2001 as a lecturer. She has been Professor of Classics and Ancient History since 2006.

Edwards researches Roman cultural history and Latin prose literature, particularly Seneca the Younger. She also researches the reception of Classical antiquity in later periods.

Edwards is the presenter of the three-part BBC series Mothers, Murderers and Mistresses: Empresses of Ancient Rome. She has also contributed to BBC Radio 4's In Our Time series, on Cleopatra, Roman Britain, Virgil's Aeneid, Tacitus and the decadence of Rome, Pliny the Younger, The Augustan Age and Marcus Aurelieus.

She served as president of the Society for the Promotion of Roman Studies from June 2015 to June 2018. In 2021, she was elected a Fellow of the British Academy.

== Selected publications ==
- The politics of immorality in ancient Rome. Cambridge University Press, 1993.
- Writing Rome: Textual Approaches to the City. Cambridge University Press, 1996.
- Rome the Cosmopolis. Cambridge University Press, 2003. (edited with Greg Woolf).
- Death in ancient Rome. Yale University Press, 2007.
