= Peter Garnsey =

Australian historian of the Graeco-Roman world (born 1938)

Peter Garnsey FBA FAHA
- Awards: Guggenheim Fellowship (1972)

Academic background
- Education: University of Sydney; University of Oxford

Academic work
- Discipline: Ancient history
- Sub-discipline: Social history Economic history Food and drink
- Institutions: University of Cambridge
- Doctoral students: Richard Miles; Neville Morley; Greg Woolf

Peter David Arthur Garnsey, FBA, FAHA (born 22 October 1938) is a retired classicist and academic. Born in Australia, where he studied classics at the University of Sydney as a member of St Paul’s College, he has spent most of his career at Cambridge. He was a fellow of Jesus College, Cambridge from 1974 to 2006, and a professor of the history of classical antiquity at the University of Cambridge from 1997 to 2006. His area of research concerns the history of political theory, intellectual history, social and economic history, food, famine and nutrition, and physical anthropology.

== Bibliography ==
=== Books ===
- Social Status and Legal Privilege in the Roman Empire (1970). Oxford University Press.
- The Roman Empire: Society, Economy and Culture (1987) London 1987. Co-author.
- Famine and Food Supply in the Graeco-Roman World (1988). Cambridge University Press.
- Ideas of Slavery from Aristotle to Augustine (1996). Cambridge University Press.
- Cities, Peasants and Food (1998). Cambridge University Press.
- Food and Society in Classical Antiquity (1999). Cambridge University Press.
- Evolution of the late Antique World (2001). Cambridge University Press. Co-author.
- Lactantius, Divine Institutes. Introd/Transl./Notes (2003). Liverpool University Press. Co-author.
- Thinking about Property: From Antiquity to the Age of Revolution (2007). Cambridge University Press
- Cambridge Ancient History vols. XI (2000), XII (2005), XIII(1998). Co-editor
- Rethinking Capital Punishment: The Pre-History of the Abolition of the Death Penalty (2026). Cambridge University Press
