= Ure Museum of Greek Archaeology =

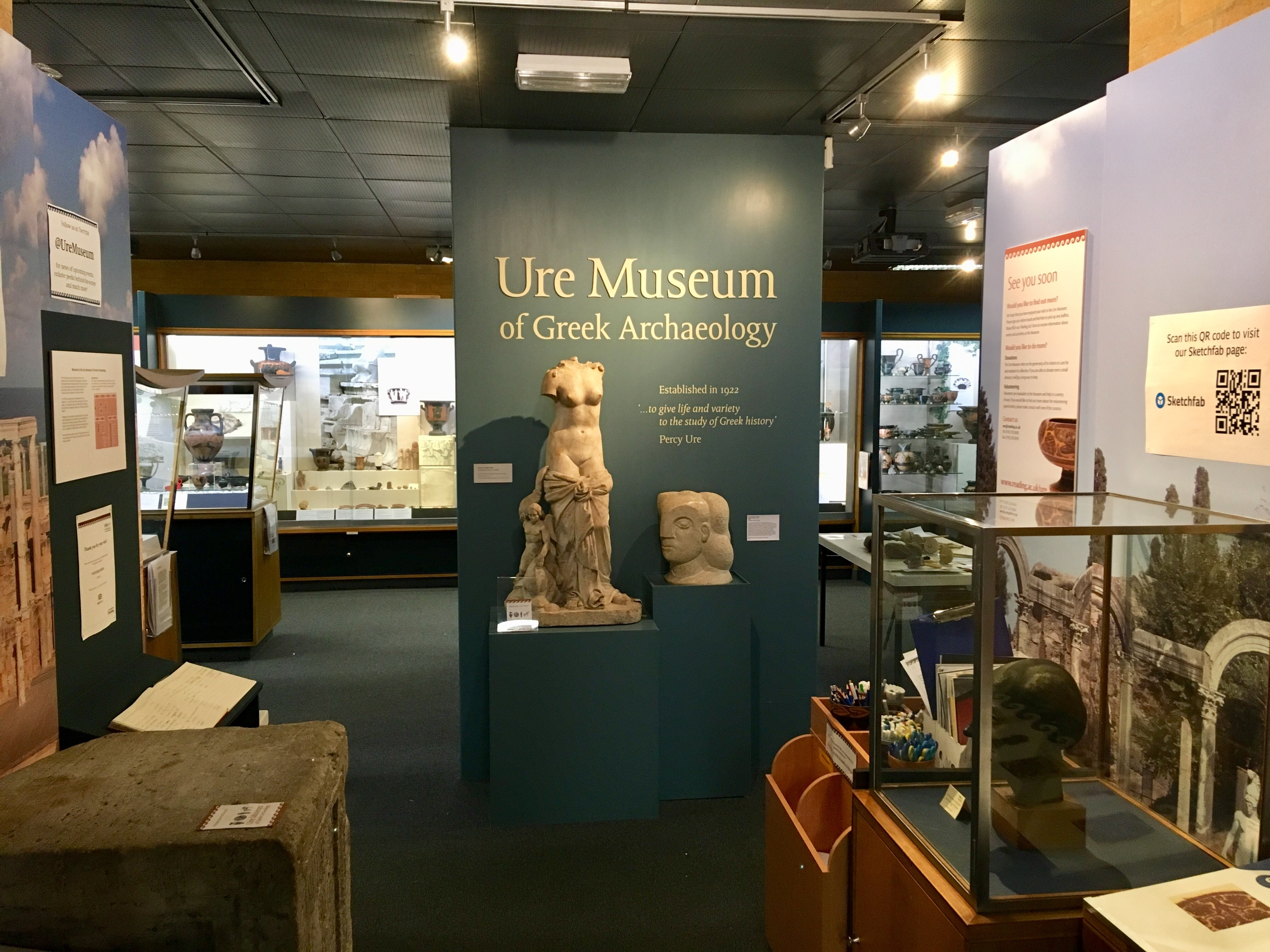
- Entrance of the museum

- Location within Reading
- Former name: Museum of Greek Archaeology
- Established: 1922
- Location: Reading, Berkshire, United Kingdom
- Coordinates: 51.441272°N 0.945522°W
- Type: University museum
- Curator: Amy C. Smith
- Website: collections.reading.ac.uk/ure-museum/

The Ure Museum of Greek Archaeology is a museum of ancient Mediterranean archaeology, primarily that of ancient Greek civilisation but with smaller collections of Egyptian, Etruscan and Roman items. It contains one of the most important collections of ancient Greek pottery in the United Kingdom. The museum is part of the University of Reading's University Museums and Special Collections Services (UMASCS), and is located in and works closely with the university's Department of Classics. The museum is situated on the university's Whiteknights Campus, about 2 miles (3.2 km) from the centre of the English town of Reading, Berkshire. The museum is open to the public and entry is free.

== Collections ==
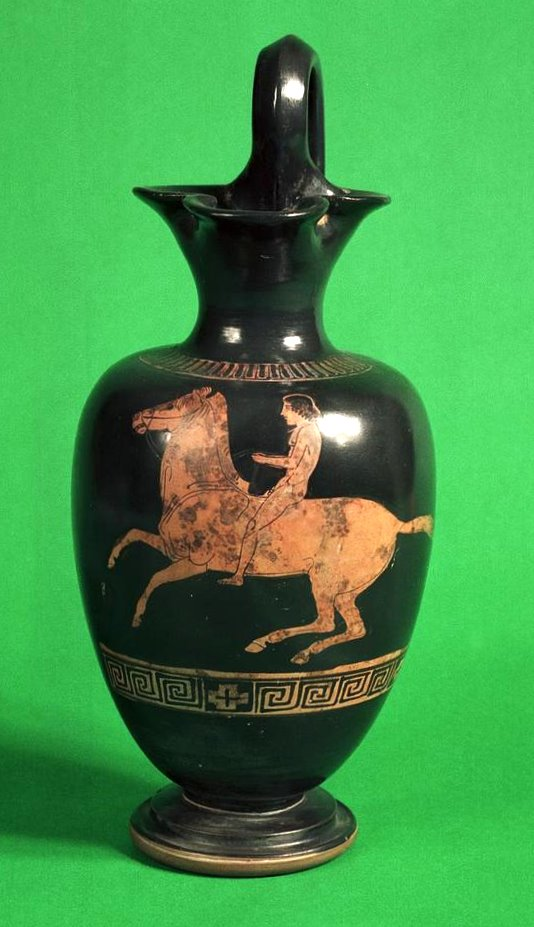
A c. 430 BC ancient Greek oinochoe attributed to the Hasselmann Painter.

The museum houses a collection of material from the Greek and Greco-Roman civilisations of the Mediterranean, most notably Greek and Etruscan ceramics and terracottas. Other exhibits include prehistoric pottery, metal and stone artifacts of Greek and Roman dates, and a collection of Egyptian antiquities, ranging from the Pre-dynastic to the Roman period. These include musical instruments, bronze and copper artefacts and jewellery, a funeral boat and a mummified cat's head.

== History ==
The museum was created in 1922 by the first Professor of Classics at the university, Percy Ure, although it contains an earlier donation of Egyptian antiquities made by Hilda Petrie in 1909 to the then Reading University College. The collections have grown through the generosity of various donors, and are recognised as the fourth largest collection of Greek ceramics in Britain. The museum is named after Professor Ure and his wife, Annie Ure, who was the museum's first curator. The current curator is Professor Amy C. Smith.

== Visiting ==
The museum is open to the public Tuesday to Thursday between 09:00 and 16:30. It is on the ground floor of the north wing of the university's Edith Morley Building. Admission is free.
