= Neville Morley =

Neville Morley (born 12 March 1969) is a British ancient historian and professor at the University of Exeter.

Morley studied history and classics at Emmanuel College of the University of Cambridge. He received a doctorate from Cambridge in 1994 for a dissertation entitled "Metropolis and hinterland: the city of Rome and the Italian economy 200 B.C. - A.D. 200," which was supervised by Peter Garnsey.

He worked as a temporary lecturer at the University of Wales, Lampeter from 1994 to 1995, then received a permanent position at the University of Bristol. In 2016, he was appointed Professor of Classics and Ancient History at the University of Exeter. From 2016 to 2018, Morley was an Einstein visiting fellow at the Free University of Berlin.

== Bibliography ==
- Classics: Why it Matters, 2018, ISBN 978-1-5095-1793-0
- With Christine Lee (eds.): A Handbook to the Reception of Thucydides, Malden MA, Wiley-Blackwell 2015, ISBN 9781405196918
- Thucydides and the Idea of History, London, I.B. Tauris 2014, ISBN 978-1-84885-170-2
- With Katherine Harloe (eds.): Thucydides and the Modern World: Reinterpretation and Influence from the Renaissance to the Present, Cambridge, Cambridge University Press 2012, ISBN 978-1-107-01920-1
- The Roman Empire: Roots of Imperialism, London, Pluto Press 2010, ISBN 978-0-7453-2869-0
- Antiquity and Modernity, Malden MA, Wiley-Blackwell 2009, ISBN 978-1-405-13139-1
- Trade in Classical Antiquity, Cambridge, Cambridge University Press, 2007, ISBN 9780511618550
- Theories, Models and Concepts in Ancient History. London & New York, Routledge 2004, ISBN 978-0-415-24877-8
- Writing Ancient History, London & Ithaca, Duckworth & Cornell University Press, 1999, ISBN 978-0-7156-2880-5
- Metropolis and Hinterland the City of Rome and the Italian Economy, 200 BC-AD 200, Cambridge, Cambridge University Press, 1996, ISBN 9780511518584
