= Mark Munn =

American ancient Greek historian (born 1953)

Mark Henderson Munn (born 1953) is an American scholar of Ancient Greek history and archaeology (with a special interest in ancient Greek political and military history as well as historiography).

== Education and career ==
Born in 1953 to American foreign service officer Robert H. Munn, Mark Munn grew up in the Middle East. He returned to the US and earned his B.A. in Classical Studies at the University of California, San Diego in 1974 and then went to the University of Pennsylvania where he earned a Ph.D. in Ancient History in 1983 (his doctoral dissertation, entitled "Studies on the territorial defenses of fourth-century Athens," was directed by A. John Graham). He also spent 1977-1978 as a regular member of the American School of Classical Studies in Athens (supported by a Heinrich Schliemann Fellowship).

Munn taught in the Department of Classics at Stanford University from 1983 to 1992 and also served as director of the Stanford-in-Greece program during that time. He next taught at the University of California, Santa Barbara and then at Penn State University where he moved through the ranks from assistant professor to full professor in the Departments of History and Classics and Ancient Mediterranean Studies (CAMS), and served as Department Head of CAMS from 2013 to 2018. In 2005 and 2011 he also served, with his wife, Dr. Mary Lou Zimmerman Munn, as Gertrude Smith Professor co-directing summer sessions of the American School of Classical Studies in Athens.

Munn was a Fellow at the Center for Hellenic Studies in Washington, DC, in the 1992–1993 academic year.

== Contributions ==
His first book, a revision of his doctoral dissertation, was The Defense of Attica: The Dema Wall and the Boiotian War of 378-375 B.C. (Berkeley and Los Angeles: University of California Press, 1993) provides a close analysis of Athenian military policy (based upon both historical and archaeological evidence). His second book, The School of History: Athens in the Age of Socrates (University of California Press, 2000) provides an impressive study of Athens in the 5th century BCE. His third book, The Mother of the Gods, Athens, and the Tyranny of Asia: A Study of Sovereignty in Ancient Religion (University of California Press, 2006), which presents an intriguing study of ancient religion and political theory.

Munn is also an active archaeologist, conducting both survey archaeology and excavations. He directed the Dema Tower Excavations in 1979, the Skourta Plain Survey from 1985 to 1989, and, since 1991, has directed the Panakton Excavation Project.

== Selected publications ==
- Mark H. Munn (with Mary Lou Zimmerman Munn), "Studies on the Attic-Boiotian Frontier: The Stanford Skourta Plain Project, 1985,” Boeotia Antiqua 1 (1989), 73-127
- Mark H. Munn, The Defense of Attica: The Dema Wall and the Boiotian War of 378-375 B.C. (Berkeley and Los Angeles: University of California Press, 1993).
- Mark H. Munn (with C.N. Runnels), "Register of Sites," Appendix A, in M.H. Jameson, C.N. Runnels, and T. van Andel, A Greek Countryside: The Southern Argolid from Prehistory to the Present Day (Stanford University Press, 1994), pp. 415–538.
- Mark H. Munn, The School of History: Athens in the Age of Socrates (University of California Press, 2000)
- Mark H. Munn (with Sharon E. Gerstel, Heather E. Grossman, Arthur H. Rohn, and Ethne Barnes), "Panakton: A Late Medieval Village," Hesperia: the Journal of the American School of Classical Studies at Athens 72 (2003), pp. 147–234
- Mark H. Munn, The Mother of the Gods, Athens, and the Tyranny of Asia: A Study of Sovereignty in Ancient Religion (University of California Press, 2006)
- Mark H. Munn, "Alexander, the Gordian Knot, and the Kingship of Midas, " in Tim Howe and Jeanne Reames, eds. Macedonian Legacies: papers on Macedonian culture and history in honor of Eugene N. Borza (Claremont, CA: Regina Books, 2008), pp. 107–143
- Mark H. Munn, "Earth and Water: The Foundations of Sovereignty in Ancient Thought, " in Cynthia Kosso and Anne Scott, eds., The Nature and Function of Water, Baths, Bathing and Hygiene from Antiquity through the Renaissance (Leiden: Brill, 2009), pp. 292–320
- Mark H. Munn, "Panakton and Drymos: A Disputed Frontier, " in Hans Lohmann and Torsten Mattern, eds., Attika: Archäologie einer “zentralen” Klulturandschaft (Wiesbaden: Harrassowitz Verlag, 2010), pp. 189–200
- Mark H. Munn, "Eros and the Laws in Historical Context," in Gregory Recco and Eric Sanday, eds., Plato’s Laws: Force and Truth in Politics (Bloomington: Indiana University Press, 2012), pp. 31–47
- Mark H. Munn, "Why History? On the Origin of Historical Writing, " in Timothy Howe, Sabine Müller, Richard Stoneman, eds., Ancient Historiography on War and Empire (Oxford: Oxbow Books, 2017), pp. 2–23.
- Mark H. Munn, "Inscriptions from Panakton," Hesperia 90 (2021), pp. 281–337
- Mark H. Munn, "The Phrygian inscription W-03 on the Arslan Kaya monument," Kadmos 63 (2024), pp. 79-92
