= Katherine Harloe =

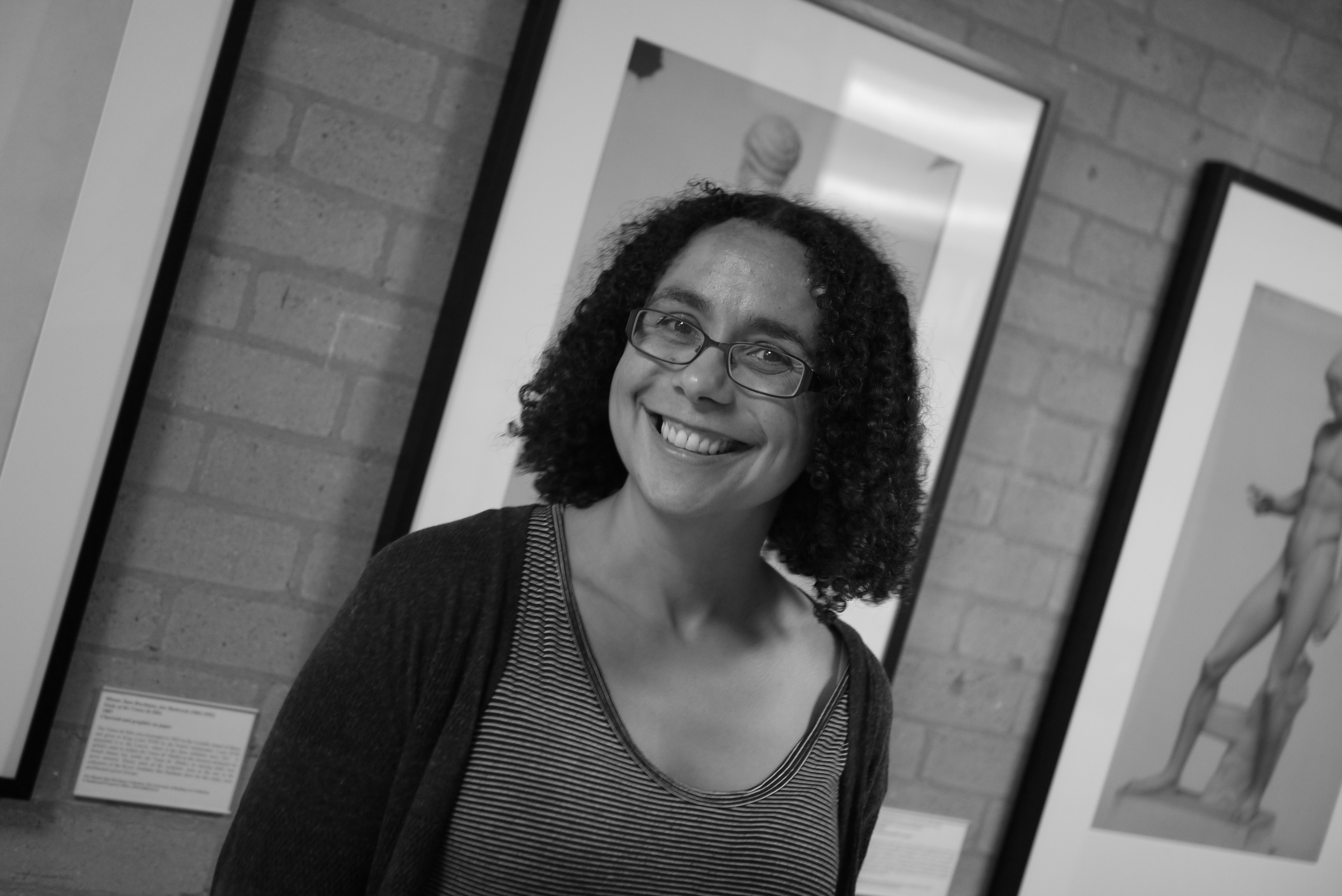
Katherine Harloe

Katherine Harloe FRHistS FHEA (born 1978) is an English classicist who is Professor of Classics and Director of the Institute of Classical Studies, School of Advanced Study, University of London. Previously she was Professor of Classics at the University of Reading. She is an expert on the history of classical scholarship, the reception of Greek and Roman antiquity, and the eighteenth-century German classicist and art historian Johann Joachim Winckelmann. She is the first black professor of classics in the UK, and the first woman director of the ICS.

== Education ==
Harloe was educated at a state school in Essex, and did not receive a classical education. She received tuition in Latin at the weekend during sixth form, and took her GCSE Latin alongside her A-Levels. She went on to read Literae Humaniores at Magdalen College, Oxford. Harloe was awarded her PhD in philosophy from the University of Cambridge in 2004. Her doctoral thesis was entitled Franz Neumann, the Rule of Law and the Unfulfilled Promise of Classical Liberal Thought, and was supervised by Raymond Geuss.

== Career ==
After completing her doctoral studies, Harloe held postdoctoral research fellowships at the University of Oxford (St Anne's College) and the Institute of Greece, Rome and the Classical Tradition at the University of Bristol. She joined the University of Reading in 2007 and was made Professor in 2019. In October 2021, she took up the post of Director of the Institute of Classical Studies. She is the first woman to hold the post.

Harloe's principal areas of research include the reception of classical antiquity in Europe from 1750 to the present, eighteenth-century neoclassical aesthetics, the history of Homeric scholarship, and the scholarship of classical myth. Harloe is a world-leading expert on Winckelmann. She published the monograph Winckelmann and the invention of antiquity: History and aesthetics in the age of Altertumswissenschaften (Oxford University Press) in 2013. The work was described as 'learned, fascinating and well-written'. She received a Mid-Career Fellowship from the British Academy to study Winckelmann's homoerotic love letters and their reception in the nineteenth century. She is a committee member of the International Winckelmann Committee and of the International Committee of the Winckelmann-Gesellschaft.

Harloe has co-curated exhibitions on Winckelmann, including ‘From Italy to Britain: Winckelmann and the spread of neoclassical taste’ at St Andrew's Hall in Reading, which ran for three months in late 2017, and ‘Winckelmann and Curiosity in the 18th-Century Gentleman’s Library’ at Christ Church Upper Library in Oxford, which ran for five months in 2018. Both were curated with Amy C. Smith, while Allan Hiscutt also curated the ‘From Italy to Britain’ exhibition and Cristina Neagu. In June 2021 she hosted the programme 'Detoxifying The Classics' on BBC Radio 4. Between 2021 and 2024, Harloe is principal investigator on the AHRC-funded research project 'Beyond Notability: Re-evaluating Women's Work in Archaeology, History and Heritage in Britain, 1870–1950', working alongside Amara Thornton and James Baker as co-investigators.

Harloe is a co-editor of the International Journal of the Classical Tradition. She is a Fellow of the Royal Historical Society and a Fellow of the Higher Education Academy. She was a founding co-chair of the Women's Classical Committee (UK) 2015–17 and served on the group's Steering Committee.

== Bibliography ==
- ed. with Neville Morley (2012) Thucydides and the modern world : reception, reinterpretation and influence from the Renaissance to the present. Cambridge: Cambridge University Press.
- (2013) Winckelmann and the Invention of Antiquity: History and Aesthetics in the Age of Altertumswissenschaft. Classical Presences. Oxford, New York: Oxford University Press. ISBN 9780199695843
- (2017) 'Sympathy, tragedy and the morality of sentiment in Lessing's Laocoon'. In: Lifschitz, A. and Squire, M. (eds.) Re-thinking Lessing's Laocoon: Classical Antiquity, the German Enlightenment and the 'Limits' of Painting and Poetry. Oxford University Press, Oxford, pp. 157–176.
- (2017) 'Kritische Zeitgenossen: Lessing, Heyne, Herder'. In: Disselkamp, M. and Testa, F. (eds.) Winckelmann-Handbuch: Leben-Werk-Wirkung. J.B. Metzler, Stuttgart, pp. 258–267.
- Evangelista, S. and Harloe, K. (2017) 'Pater's ‘Winckelmann’: aesthetic criticism and classical reception'. In: Martindale, C., Prettejohn, E. and Evangelista, S. (eds.) Pater the Classicist. Oxford University Press, Oxford, pp. 63–80.
- (2018) 'The siege of Troy'. In: Heuser, B. and Leoussi, A. (eds.) Famous Battles and How They Shaped the Modern World c.1200 BCE - 1302 CE: From Troy to Courtrai. Pen & Sword, Barnsley.
- Harloe, K., Neagu, C. and Smith, A. C., eds. (2018) Winckelmann and curiosity in the 18th-century gentleman's library. Christ Church Library Exhibitions. Christ Church Publications, Oxford.
- Harloe, K., Momigliano, N. and Farnoux, A., eds. (2018) Hellenomania. Papers of the British School at Athens. Taylor and Francis, Abingdon.
- Harloe, K. and Momigliano, N. (2018) 'Hellenomania: ancient and modern obsessions with the Greek past'. In: Harloe, K., Momigliano, N. and Farnoux, A. (eds.) Hellenomania. British School at Athens - Modern Greek and Byzantine Studies. Routledge, Abingdon.
- (2018) 'Winckelmania: Hellenomania between ideal and experience'. In: Harloe, K., Momigliano, N. and Farnoux, A. (eds.) Hellenomania. British School at Athens - Modern Greek and Byzantine Studies. Taylor and Francis, Abingdon.
- (2018) 'Hannah Arendt and the quarrel of ancient and modern: 'On humanity in dark times: thoughts on Lessing' and the politics of historiography'. Classical Philology, 113 (1) pp. 20–38.
- Harloe, K. and Russell, L. (2019) 'Life and (love) letters: looking in on Winckelmann's correspondence'. Publications of the English Goethe Society, 88 (1) pp. 1–20.
- (2019) 'Philosophers and kings: response to William Bridges'. History of Humanities, 4 (1) pp. 41–45.
