= Annie Ure =

British classical archaeologist

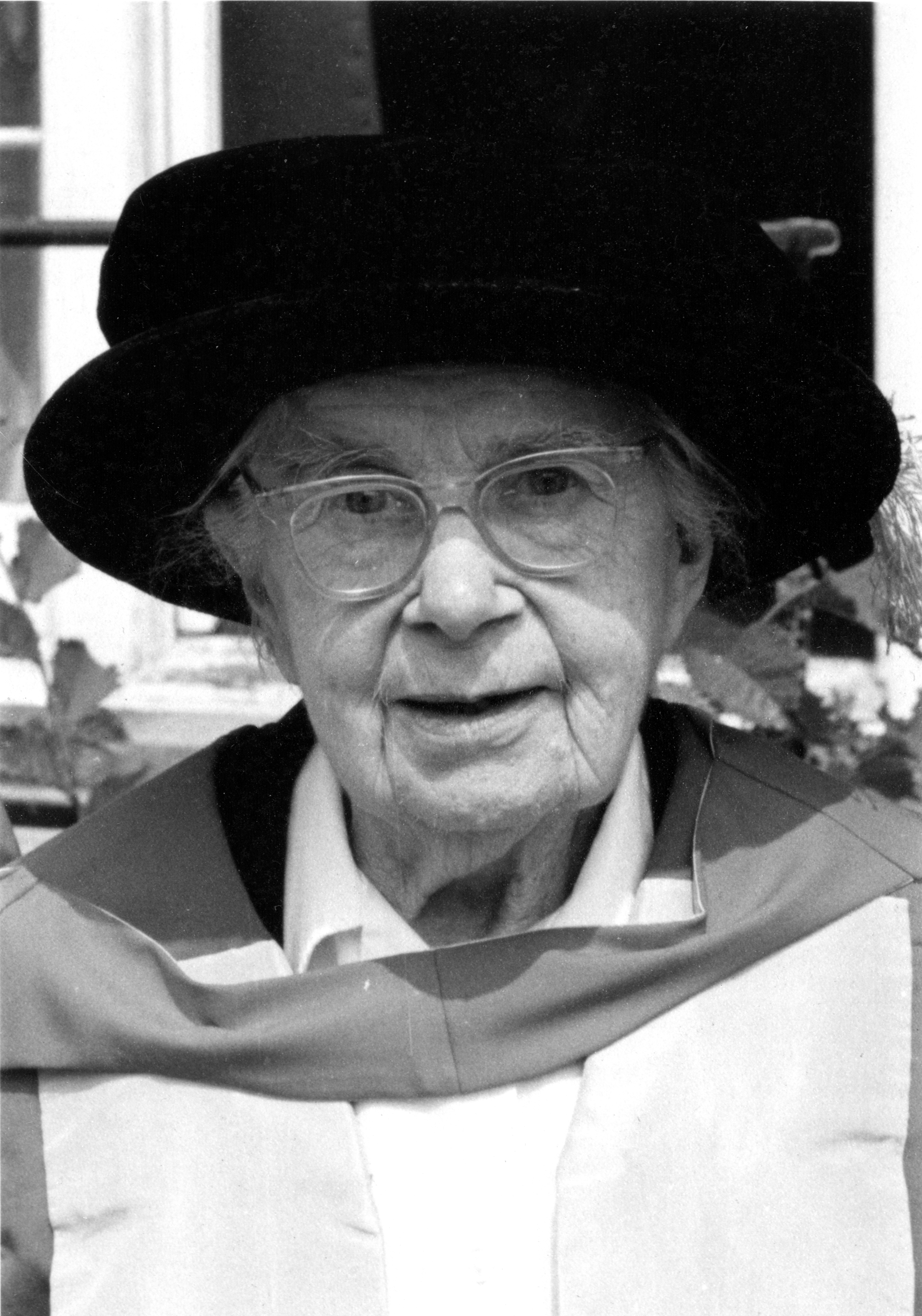
- Dr Annie Ure on the occasion of her award of an honorary doctorate, University of Reading 1976
- Born: January 31, 1893
- Died: 13 July 1976 (aged 83)
- Occupations: Archaeologist, Curator
- Relatives: Percy Ure

Annie Dunman Ure (née Hunt, January 31, 1893 - 13 July 1976) was an English archaeologist, who from 1922 to 1976 was the first Curator of the Ure Museum of Greek Archaeology. She and her husband Percy Ure conducted important excavations at Ritsona in Boeotia, Greece, making her one of the first female archaeologists to lead an excavation in Greece.

== Biography ==
Annie Dunman Hunt was born in Worcester on January 3, 1893, to George Henry Hunt, a watchmaker and jeweller, and his wife Elizabeth Ann. In her childhood, she attended Stoneycroft School, a girls' boarding school in Southport, and in 1911, Hunt was accepted to University of Reading to read classics. As Reading did not yet have a university charter, she received her B.A. from the University of London in 1914. After spending the duration of the First World War teaching at the college's Classics department, she married her former professor Percy Ure in 1918, who had personally asked for Hunt to fill in for the members of staff who had been conscripted in the war.

In the years 1921 and 1922, the Ures excavated in the Greek hamlet of Ritsona, Boeotia, resuming excavations that had been started by Percy and Ronald M. Burrows between 1905 and 1909. The site was believed to correspond to the ancient necropolis of Mykalessos, a town mentioned in Thucydides' Peloponnesian War to have suffered a massacre at the hands of Thracian mercenaries. Focused primarily on burials, the excavations produced a significant host of Boeotian pottery, which were important in their contribution to the classification and dating of Greek ceramics. Percy and Annie co-authored several important books on finds at Ritsona, and in 1922 founded Reading's Museum of Greek Archaeology. Ure assumed an honorary role as its first curator, a position she kept until her death. During these years, she travelled for study and research in museums across Europe, and was elected as a corresponding member of the German Archaeological Institute. Annie also taught at the Abbey School and within the Department of Classics at the University of Reading. Together, the Ures published well as over fifty articles on Greek pottery, until Percy's death in 1950.

In 1954, Ure published a collaborative volume alongside her late husband in the international Corpus vasorum antiquorum series, which covered about half of the current Ure Museum collection. This monograph was described as a 'monument to their exacting diligence', and covered 'lesser known styles and classes of Greek pottery, seldom encountered in the plates of other fasicules'. It 'won wide acclaim' at an academic meeting in Lyon in 1956.

Ure died 13 July 1976, at the age of 83, ten days after receiving an Honorary Doctorate from the University of Reading. She was survived by her two children, Bill and Jean.

== Publications ==
- A. Ure. 1922 A Black-figure Fragment in the Dorset Museum, Journal of Hellenic Studies 42: 192–97.
- P. Ure and A. Ure. 1927. Sixth and Fifth Century Pottery from Rhitsona. Oxford University Press: Oxford.
- A. Ure. 1929 Boeotian geometricising vases. JHS 49: 160–171.
- P. Ure and A. Ure. 1954. Corpus Vasorum Antiquorum. Great Britain 12. Reading 1. Oxford University Press: Oxford.
- A. Ure. 1955 Krokotos and White Heron. Journal of Hellenic Studies 75: 90–103.
- A. Ure. 1955. Threshing-floor or Vineyard. Classical Quarterly n.s. 5: 225–30.
- A. Ure. 1958 The Argos Painter and the Painter of the Dancing Pan. American Journal of Archaeology 62: 389–95.
- A. Ure. 1962 Boeotian Pottery from the Athenian Agora. Hesperia 31: 369–77.
