= Avlida =

Avlida Αυλίδα
- Municipal unit
- Location within the regional unit

- Location within Greece
- Coordinates: 38°24′N 23°36′E
- Country: Greece
- Administrative region: Central Greece
- Regional unit: Euboea
- Municipality: Chalcis

Area
  - Municipal unit: 122.2 km^{2} (47.2 sq mi)

Population (2021)
  - Municipal unit: 10,006
  - Municipal unit density: 81.88/km^{2} (212.1/sq mi)
- Time zone: UTC+2 (EET)
  - Summer (DST): UTC+3 (EEST)
- Vehicle registration: ΧΑ

Avlida (Greek: Αυλίδα, pronounced [avˈliða]) or Aulis (/ˈɔːlɪs/) a former municipality in Euboea regional unit, Greece. Since the 2011 local government reform it is part of the municipality Chalcis, of which it is a municipal unit. The population was 10,006 inhabitants at the 2021 census, and the land area is 122.235 km^{2}. The seat of the municipality was in Vathy. Although part of the Euboea regional unit, it is not located on the island Euboea, but on the mainland, attached to the northeastern part of Boeotia.

Traditionally, it is identified with the ancient Aulis, the port from which the Greek army set sail for the Trojan War and the setting for the Euripides play, Iphigenia in Aulis.

== History ==
It is unknown when exactly Avlida was founded. The region was settled in Antiquity, but the modern settlement likely dates to the early 11th century, when the local church of Saint Nicholas was built. Additional Byzantine-era remains have been found near the location of the ancient temple of Artemis. In 1350, as part of the war between the Republic of Venice and the Republic of Genoa, the Venetians defeated and captured a Genoese fleet of fourteen Genoese galleys on the coast off Avlida. In the late 14th century, Avlida likely became part of the a five-mile wide strip of land along the coast owned by the Venetians, across from the Venetian colony of Euboea (Negroponte).
