= Hasselmann Painter =

Classical Greek vase painter

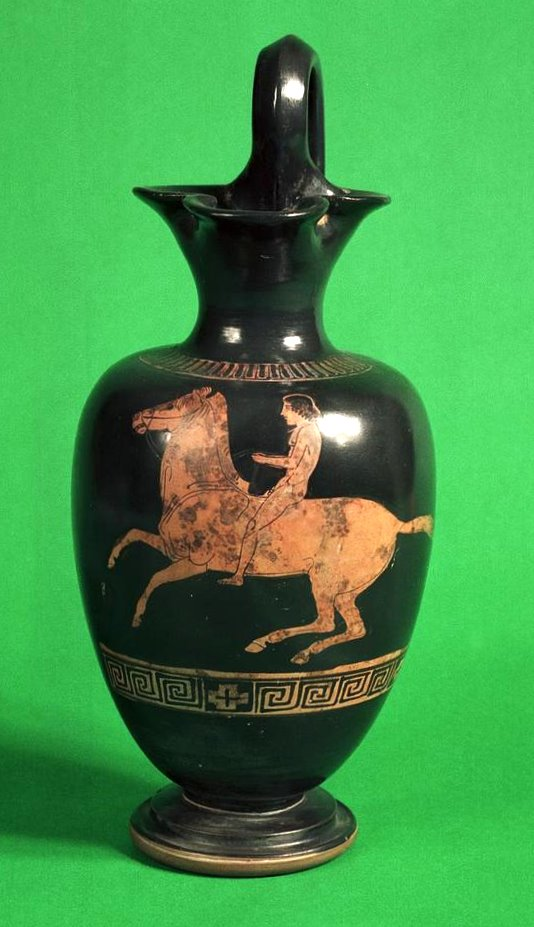
A c. 430 BC ancient Greek oinochoe attributed to the Hasselmann Painter in the Ure Museum of Greek Archaeology.

The Hasselmann Painter was an ancient Greek red-figure vase painter. He worked in the mid-5th century BC.

The Ure Museum of Greek Archaeology holds an important vase by the Hasselmann Painter showing a nude youth on horseback, purchased to mark the award of an honorary degree of D.Litt. to Sir John Beazley.

The Mildred Lane Kemper Art Museum has a pelike showing two figures in conversation, the gift of Robert Brookings and Charles Parsons, 1904.
