= Percy Ure =

British classical archaeologist (1879–1950)

Percy Neville Ure
- Born: May 10, 1879
- Died: April 3, 1950 (aged 70)
- Occupation: Professor of Classics
- Employer: University of Reading
- Organization: Ure Museum of Greek Archaeology
- Spouse: Annie Ure

Percy Neville Ure M.A. (10 May 1879 – 3 April 1950) was the University of Reading's first Professor of Classics (1911–1946) and the founder of the Ure Museum of Greek Archaeology at Reading. His wife and former pupil at Reading, Annie Ure (1893–1976), was the museum's first Curator from 1922 until her death. The Ures were experts on Greek and Egyptian antiquities, and particularly Greek ceramics. With Ronald M. Burrows, they undertook important excavations at Rhitsona in Boeotia, Greece.

Percy has been described as "an inveterate picker-up of fragments" which he acquired wherever he could, including from children or discarded under bushes at archaeological sites like Rhitsona or Mycenae. Many were packed in the boxes of Percy's favourite cigarettes. He also accepted a donation of "battered" items from the British Museum. Percy collected plain and functional items neglected by other scholars, believing that they might be as informative as more attractive pieces.

Together the Ures enjoyed a passion for Greek ceramics and Boeotian pottery in particular. They wrote several important books on finds at Rhitsona as well as over fifty articles on Greek pottery. In 1954 they produced an important volume in the international series, Corpus Vasorum Antiquorum, which covered about half of the current Ure Museum collection.

== Selected publications ==
- Ure, P. 1921 The Greek Renaissance. London: Methuen. Free download.
- Ure, P. 1922. The Origin of Tyranny. Cambridge: University Press, 1922. Free download.
- Ure, P. and Ure, A. 1927. Sixth & fifth century pottery from excavations made at Rhitsona. London: Oxford University Press.
- Ure, P. 1951. Justinian and His Age. Harmondsworth: Penguin Books.
- Ure, P.N. and Ure, A.D. Corpus Vasorum Antiquorum: Great Britain-University of Reading. London: Oxford University Press, 1954.
