= Institute of Classical Studies =

UK research institution

- Established: 1953
- Focus: Classical studies
- Director: Katherine Harloe
- Owner: School of Advanced Study, University of London
- Address: Senate House, Malet Street
- Location: London, England, United Kingdom
- Website: ics.sas.ac.uk

The Institute of Classical Studies is a research institution associated with the University of London and a member of the School of Advanced Study. The institute is a national and international research institute in the languages, literature, history, art, archaeology and philosophy of the ancient Greek and Roman worlds. The institute was founded in 1953 by the Senate of the University of London as a partnership between the university and the Hellenic and Roman Societies.

The institute produces the Bulletin of the Institute of Classical Studies (BICS), an academic journal published by Oxford University Press, and a monographic series of BICS Supplements. BICS is indexed by L'Année philologique.

== List of directors ==
- Eric Gardner Turner (1953 to 1963)
- Reginald Pepys Winnington-Ingram (1964 to 1967)
- Eric Handley (1967 to 1984)
- John Barron (1984 to 1991)
- Richard Sorabji (1991 to 1996)
- Geoffrey B. Waywell (1997 to 2004)
- Chris Carey (acting, 2004)
- Tim Cornell (2004 to 2006)
- Mike Edwards (2006 to 2011)
- John North (acting, January 2012 to August 2014)
- Chris Carey (acting, September 2014 to December 2014)
- Greg Woolf (January 2015 to June 2021)
- Katherine Harloe (October 2021 to present)
- Kathryn Tempest (acting, September 2025 to June 2026)
